= List of civil engineers =

This list of civil engineers is a list of notable people who have been trained in or have practiced civil engineering.

== A ==
Name	Notability	References
Duff Abrams	Early concrete researcher	
Bahaedin Adab	Iranian Kurdish politician and engineer	
Campbell W. Adams	New York State Engineer and Surveyor	
Charles Adler Jr.	American inventor of traffic lights and railway engineer	
Marcus Agrippa	Ancient Roman general	
Povl Ahm	Danish former Ove Arup & Partners chairman	
Mahmoud Ahmadinejad	President of Iran	
John Aird	English engineer from the late 19th century	
Maurice L. Albertson	American water resources engineer and academic	
Truman H. Aldrich	American civil and mining engineer	
Thomas Aldwell	American engineer of the Elwha Dam	
Ángela Alessio Robles	Mexican civil engineer and town planner	
Archie Alexander	American bridge and road engineer	
Don A. Allen	Member of the California State Assembly and of the Los Angeles City Council in the 1940s and 1950s	
Renato de Albuquerque	Brazilian founder of Albuquerque & Takaoka	
Horatio Allen	American railway engineer	
Braden Allenby	American civil engineering professor	
John Wolfe Ambrose	American engineer and namesake of the Ambrose Channel in New York	
Othmar Ammann	Designed the George Washington Bridge, among others	
David Anderson	Scottish civil engineer and lawyer	
Apollodorus of Damascus	Ancient Greek engineer and architect	
Yasser Arafat	Former Palestinian President	
William George Armstrong	British engineer and 22nd president of the Institution of Civil Engineers	
Ferdinand Arnodin	French bridge builder	
Sir William Arrol	Scottish engineer involved with the construction of the Tay Rail Bridge, the Forth Bridge and Tower Bridge	
Ove Arup	Founder of Arup	
John Aspinall	British railway engineer	
William Sydney Atkins	Founder of Atkins, one of the United Kingdom's largest engineering consultancies	
Peter C. Assersen	Rear Admiral in the United States Navy	
Gunvald Aus	Norwegian-American engineer, engineered the construction of the Woolworth Building in New York City	
Bilal M. Ayyub	American engineering academic	
Mohamed Atta	Ringleader of the September 11th attacks, hijacker-pilot of American Airlines Flight 11	

== B ==
Name	Notability	References
Benjamin Baker	English engineer in late 19th century	
William Baker	American structural engineer of the Burj Khalifa	
Michel Bakhoum	Egyptian consultant engineer and academic	
Nicol Hugh Baird	Canal engineer and surveyor	
George Rumford Baldwin	American canal engineer	
James Fowle Baldwin	American canal engineer	
Loammi Baldwin	American engineer and soldier	
Hannskarl Bandel	Madison Square Garden roof, Crystal Cathedral	
Harvey Oren Banks	State Engineer of California	
James Arthur Banks	British dam engineer	
Robert Barker	English railway engineer who also played in the first ever football international game	
Henry Barnes	Traffic engineer who worked in US cities during 20th century	
Nora Stanton Blatch Barney	American civil engineer	
Peter W. Barlow	English engineer in late 19th century; notable for Lambeth Bridge (old) and tunnelling shield	
William Henry Barlow	English engineer in late 19th century; railway engineering	
Frank Baron	American academic	
Alfred Barrett	American engineer of the Erie Canal	
Javier Barros Sierra	Mexican engineer and teacher	
Sir John Wolfe-Barry	English engineer in late 19th century; designed Tower Bridge	
Lt Col Arthur John Barry	English engineer in late 19th and early 20th century; projects in China and India	
John Vernon Bartlett	British civil and military engineer	
Edward William Barton-Wright	British martial arts teacher	
John Frederic La Trobe Bateman	British hydraulic engineer	
Sir Joseph Bazalgette	English engineer in late 19th century; London sewerage system	
Sir Thomas Hudson Beare	English engineer, academic	
Nikolai Apollonovich Belelubsky	Russian bridge engineer	
Bernard Forest de Belidor	Hydraulic engineer	
Horace Bell	British railway engineer in India	
William Bennet	English canal engineer	
William Bennett	Irish-Australian bridge builder; Prince Alfred Bridge, Denison Bridge	
Samuel Bentham	Designer of Vauxhall Bridge	
Arthur Bergan	Canadian highways engineer	
Sir George Berkley	British railway engineer	
Henry Berry	Liverpool dock engineer	
Charles Beyer	Anglo-German locomotive engineer	
George Parker Bidder	British engineer; railways, telegraphs and hydraulics	
Sir Alexander Binnie	English engineer in late 19th century; tunnels and bridges across the Thames	
William Binnie	British waterworks engineer, son of the above	
Geoffrey Binnie	Dam engineer, grandson and son of the above	
Osama bin Laden	Founder of al-Qaeda, studied civil engineering at university	
Alan W. Bishop	Developer of Bishop's method of analysing earth dams	
Magnus Bjorndal	American engineer and inventor	
John Blenkinsop	English engineer in mid-19th century; railways, locomotives and mining	
Benjamin Blyth	Scottish railway engineer	
Benjamin Blyth II	Scottish railway engineer, first practising Scottish engineer to become president of the Institution of Civil Engineers	
Gudmundur S. (Bo) Bodvarsson	Icelandic civil engineer and researcher	
Alfred P. Boller	American civil engineer	
Sir Thomas Bouch	English engineer in late 19th century; first Tay Rail Bridge disaster	
Guillaume Boutheroue	17th-century French canal engineer	
John Bradfield	Designer of Sydney Harbour Bridge	
William Bragge	English engineer in the 19th century	
Frederick Bramwell	British engineer	
Jacob R. Brandt	American engineer in mid-19th century; covered bridge engineer	
James Brindley	English engineer from mid-18th century; designed canals and watermills	
John Alexander Brodie	City Engineer of Liverpool and inventor of the football goal net	
Samuel Brown	British naval officer and bridge designer	
William Brown	structural engineer	
George Barclay Bruce	English railway engineer	
Peter Bruff	British civil engineer	
Henry Marc Brunel	English engineer in late 19th century	
Isambard Kingdom Brunel	English engineer in mid-19th century; designed Great Western Railway, a series of famous steamships, and important bridges	
Marc Isambard Brunel	French engineer in early 19th century; notable for the Thames tunnel	
James Brunlees	Scottish engineer notable for designing Southend Pier	
Peter Bruff	English engineer in 19th century; notable for work in Clacton on Sea	
Dorothy Donaldson Buchanan	First woman to be admitted as a member to the Institute of Civil Engineers	
Sir George Buchanan	British civil engineer associated with harbour works in Burma, Iraq and Bombay, during early 20th century	
George W. Buck	British canal, bridge and railway engineer	
Leffert L. Buck	American civil engineer	
Alfred Burges	British civil engineer	
John Burland	Professor of civil engineering	
Godliver Businge	Ugandan civil engineer	

== C ==
Name	Notability	References
Santiago Calatrava	Spanish architect: skyscrapers, bridges, train stations	
Leopoldo Calvo Sotelo	Spanish Prime Minister	
Ian McDonald Campbell	British civil engineer	
Harold Camping	Civil engineer and end times prophecy maker	
Frederick William Cappelen	American engineer, designed the Cappelen Memorial Bridge in Minneapolis, Minnesota	
Albert Caquot	French civil engineer	
Edgar Cardoso	Portuguese civil engineer and professor	
Marie François Sadi Carnot	French civil engineer, then President of France	
Arthur Casagrande	Civil engineer specialising in geotechnics	
Giovanni Domenico Cassini	17th- and 18th-century astronomer and engineer of papal fortifications	
Heberto Castillo Martínez	Mexican engineer, writer, social leader and political activist. Inventor of the composite material tridilosa	
Augustin Louis Cauchy	French mathematician	
Louis-Alexandre de Cessart	French bridge builder	
Octave Chanute	19th-century American railroad engineer and aviation pioneer	
Joseph Chaley	French suspension bridge designer	
Maria Amélia Chaves	First female civil engineer to graduate from Instituto Superior Técnico at Universidade Técnica de Lisboa. Considered first Portuguese woman to graduate and then work in civil engineering, and the first Portuguese female engineer to work in the field.	
Lemuel Chenoweth	American covered bridge designer	
Jamilur Reza Choudhury	Vice-Chancellor of University of Asia Pacific	
Edwin Clark	Designer of the Anderton Boat Lift	
William Tierney Clark	English engineer in mid-19th century; suspension bridges	
Barry Clarke	British geotechnical engineer	
G. Wayne Clough	Former president of the Georgia Institute of Technology; current secretary of the Smithsonian Institution	
Reginald Coates	British civil engineer and academic	
Alan Cockshaw	British civil engineer and ICE President	
Clarence S. Coe	American railroad and span bridge designer and builder	
Abraham Burton Cohen	American civil engineer	
Joseph Colaco	American structural engineer	
David Consunji	Filipino businessman and chairman of DMCI Holdings, Inc.; 2017 Forbes 6th richest Filipino	
Henry Conybeare	English civil engineer and architect, responsible for creating a clean water supply to Mumbai	
John Coode	English engineer, notable for work on Portland Harbour	
Theodore Cooper	American civil engineer, supervisor of Quebec Bridge	
Hugues Cosnier	17th-century French canal engineer	
Charles-Augustin de Coulomb	Physicist who also developed methods for retaining wall design	
Peter Chalmers Cowan	British civil engineer	
Peter Arthur Cox	British civil engineer	
Henry Cronin	British civil engineer	
Hardy Cross	American engineer in 20th century; notable for the developer of the moment distribution method	
Edward Cruttwell	English civil engineer, particularly associated with Tower Bridge	
Joseph Cubitt	Designer of Blackfriars Railway Bridge	
William Cubitt	English engineer in 19th century	
Carl Culmann	German engineer in mid-19th century; notable for graphical pioneering statical methods	

== D ==
Name	Notability	References
Leonardo da Vinci		
James Dadford	English canal engineer	
John Dadford	English canal engineer	
Thomas Dadford	English canal engineer	
Thomas Dadford Jr.	English canal engineer	
Gustaf Dalén	Sun valve, unmanned acetylene lighthouses	
George Christian Darbyshire	Australian railway engineer	
Henry Darcy	Hydraulics	
William Dargan	Irish railway engineer	
Jonathan Davidson	British civil engineer	
Simon James Dawson	Red River road	
Bruce Day	Australian bridge engineer	
Fabrizio de Miranda	Italian bridge engineer	
H. D. Deve Gowda	Ex-Prime Minister of India	
Samuel Diescher	Hungarian railway engineer	
Franz Dischinger	German civil and structural engineer	
Sydney Donkin	British civil, mechanical and electrical engineer	
Mulalo Doyoyo	South African engineer, inventor and professor	
Francis Drake		
James Nicholas Douglass	English lighthouse engineer	
Guillaume Henri Dufour	Swiss army officer, surveyor and engineer	
Jules Dupuit		
Dick Dusseldorp	Dutch/Australian water engineer	
Antonina Dvoryanets	Ukrainian hydraulic engineer	
H. Kempton Dyson	British civil and structural engineer	

== E ==
Name	Notability	References
James Buchanan Eads	American civil engineer	
Elsie Eaves	American civil engineer	
John S. Eastwood	American dam engineer	
Marc Edwards	American professor	
Alexandre Gustave Eiffel	Eiffel Tower	
Hans Albert Einstein	Hydraulics	
Clark Eldridge	Tacoma Narrows Bridge designer	
Charles Ellet Jr.	American army officer and engineer	
Robert Elliott-Cooper	British civil engineer	
Edward B. Ellington	British hydraulic engineer	
William Henry Ellis	British civil engineer and steel maker	
Bill Emery	CEO of the Office of Rail Regulation	
Jose Izquierdo Encarnacion	Puerto Rican Secretary of State	
John Endres	Prussian-American railway engineer	
John Ericsson	Propeller, USS Monitor	
Edilberto Evangelista	Filipino engineer and soldier	
John Breedon Everard	English civil engineer	

== F ==
Name	Notability	References
William Fairhurst	Bridge builder and chess master	
Hilario Fernández Long	Argentine engineer and university president	
Joshua Field	Telegraph cables, sewerage	
Albert Fink	German railway engineer	
James Finley	American suspension bridge designer	
Maurice Fitzmaurice	Irish bridge, dam and tunnel engineer	
Ken Fleming	Northern Irish civil engineer and piling and foundations specialist	
Sanford Fleming	Railroads, time zones	
Dick Fosbury	Olympic high jumper, inventor of the Fosbury Flop	
Sir John Fowler	Bridges	
Sir Charles Fox	British railway engineer	
Charles Douglas Fox	British railway engineer	
Sir Francis Fox	British railway engineer	
Sir William Francis	British engineer	
Thomas Pierson Frank	British civil engineer	
Ralph Freeman (1880–1950)	English structural engineer	
Ralph Freeman (1911–1998)	English bridge and highways engineer	
Catherine French	American structural engineer	
Eugène Freyssinet	French structural engineer	
Buckminster Fuller		
Angus Fulton	British civil engineer	

== G ==
Name	Notability	References
David du Bose Gaillard	American engineer of the Panama Canal	
Paul Gallocher de Lagalisserie	French bridge engineer	
James Anthony Gaffney	British engineer in West Yorkshire	
T. Lindsay Galloway		
Leopoldo Fortunato Galtieri		
George Gandy	Builder of the Gandy Bridge	
Oleksandr Garmash	Ukrainian researcher	
Émiland Gauthey	French engineer and architect	
Hubert Gautier	French bridge engineer	
Robert A. Gearheart	American civil and environmental engineering professor	
William George Nicholson Geddes	Scottish engineer	
Alexander Gibb	Scottish railway and military engineer	
John Gilbert	Engineer of the Bridgewater Canal	
Alfred Giles	British civil engineer	
Francis Giles	British canal and railway engineer	
Mark Girolami	Statistician and engineer affiliated with the University of Cambridge	
William Glanville	British highways engineer	
George Washington Goethals	Panama Canal, Goethals Bridge	
William Grant	Australian civil engineer and military commander	
James Henry Greathead		
Samuel Arnold Greeley	American civil engineer, textbook author	
James Green	British canal engineer	
Charles Hutton Gregory	Railways	
William Grierson	British railway engineer	
John Griffith	Irish engineer	
Hans Ulrich Grubenmann		
Johannes Grubenmann		
Sarah Guppy	Inventor and bridge engineer	
John Gwynn	English architect and civil engineer	

== H ==
Name	Notability	References
Sir William Halcrow	Tunnels	
Benjamin Hall, 1st Baron Llanover	Big Ben	
Archibald Milne Hamilton	Callender-Hamilton bridge and Hamilton Road in Kurdistan	
Björn Hamilton	Swedish civil engineer and politician	
William Hammond Hall	American civil engineer noted for his work on Golden Gate Park and Californian water supplies	
Dr Edmund Hambly	British structural engineer	
Peter Hansford	British civil engineer, ICE President, and (from November 2012) UK chief construction adviser	
Louis Harper	Scottish bridge engineer	
Sir William Gordon Harris	British docks and roads engineer	
Thomas Harrison	British architect and engineer	
Thomas Elliott Harrison	British railway and bridge engineer	
Arthur Hartley	British oil engineer	
Sir John Hawkshaw	British railway and harbour engineer	
John Clarke Hawkshaw	British engineer, son of John Hawkshaw	
Charles Hawksley	Water engineer, son of Thomas Hawksley	
Thomas Hawksley	English engineer noted for his work on water supplies	
David Hay	British railway, bridge and tunnel engineer	
Harrison Hayter	British railway and harbour engineer	
William Hazledine	Ironfounder and bridge engineer	
Max Hecker	Austrian-born Israeli President of the Technion – Israel Institute of Technology	
Brodie Henderson	British railway engineer	
Hugh Henshall	British canal engineer and student of James Brindley	
Roger Hetherington	British civil engineer	
Roger Gaskell Hetherington	British Ministry of Health civil engineer	
Clement Hindley	British railway engineer	
Charles DeLano Hine	American railway engineer and management pioneer	
Edward N. Hines	American highway engineer	
James Hird	Australian rules footballer	
George Andrew Hobson	British railway and bridge engineer; designed Victoria Falls Bridge	
Raymond Ho	Hong King functional constituency representative for engineering	
Walter Hohmann	Buildings	
Karen Holford	Welsh acoustic engineer and academic	
Clifford Milburn Holland	Holland Tunnel	
Xavier Hommaire de Hell	19th-century French engineer active in Turkey, southern Russia and Persia	
Herbert Hoover	Mining engineer and 31st President of the United States	
John Hore	English canal engineer and surveyor	
Manuel Hornibrook	Engineer of the Hornibrook Bridge	
John Hotaling	American soldier and businessman	
Clarence Decatur Howe	Grain elevators	
John Howell & Son	Engineers of main drainage system in Hastings, East Sussex	
Hu Jintao	General Secretary of the Chinese Communist Party, President of China	
George Humphreys	British civil engineer	
Tillinghast L'Hommedieu Huston	American civil engineer involved in the reconstruction of Cuba after the Spanish–American War, co-owner of the New York Yankees	

== I ==
Name	Notability	References
Imhotep; M18 G17 R4 X1 Q3	Pharaonic engineer who built the first Egyptian pyramid, the Step Pyrmanid of Djoser	
Charles Inglis	British engineer and academic	
James Charles Inglis	British engineer	
Laura Irasuegi Otal	Soviet trained Spanish engineer, Niños de Rusia (Children of Russia)	

== J ==
Name	Notability	References
William Jackson	Boston city engineer	
Elin Jacobsson	Civil and architectural engineer	
John Wykeham Jacomb-Hood	Railway engineer	
Robert Jacomb-Hood	Civil and railway engineer	
George Robert Jebb	Railway and canal engineer	
John Holmes Jellett	Docks and harbours	
John B. Jervis	Canals and railroads	
Josias Jessop	Engineer; son of William Jessop	
William Jessop	Canals	
Harry Edward Jones	British gasworks engineer	
Paul Jowitt	ICE President; sustainable engineering	
Theodore Judah	Railroads	
Edward Judge	Bridges	

== K ==
Name	Notability	References
Vistasp Karbhari	Eighth president of the University of Texas at Arlington	
William Keay	English civil engineer and architect	
Alexander Kennedy	British maritime and electrical engineer and academic	
Joanna Kennedy	English civil engineer and project manager	
Oleg Kerensky	Russian engineer with Freeman Fox & Partners	
Boris Kerner	Developer of three-phase traffic theory	
Fazlur Rahman Khan	Bangladeshi structural engineer and skyscraper specialist	
Zenas King	American engineer of the King Bridge Company	
Ivica Kirin	Croatian politician with a degree in geotechnical engineering	
Hermann Knoflacher	Austrian academic	
Georg Knorr	Railway engineer	

== L ==
Name	Notability	References
Charles Labelye	Swiss engineer of the Westminster Bridge	
Kirby Laing	Former chairman of John Laing Group	
George Thomas Landmann	Military engineer and designer of first elevated suburban passenger railway	
Tulio Larrínaga	Puerto Rican Resident Commissioner	
Rashid Latif	Former Pakistani cricket team wicketkeeper and captain	
J. J. Leeming	British county surveyor and road engineer	
Robert Legget	Canadian non-fiction writer	
Thomas Leiper	Designer of a canal and railway	
Cornelis Lely	Dutch civil engineer and statesman, realised the Zuiderzee works as designer and Minister of Transport and Water Management	
Curtis LeMay	U.S. Air Force general and Vice-Presidential candidate	
William LeMessurier	American structural engineer	
David Lennox	Scottish mason and bridge engineer	
Fritz Leonhardt	German structural engineer	
Ferdinand de Lesseps	Engineer for the Suez Canal	
Tung-Yen Lin	Bridges, the pioneer of pre-stressed concrete	
Louis Maurice Adolphe Linant de Bellefonds	Chief Engineer of the Suez Canal	
Gustav Lindenthal	Czech bridge engineer	
William Lindley	Water and sewerage works	
Joseph Locke	Railways	
Joseph Lstiburek	Canadian forensic engineer	
Anthony George Lyster	British docks engineer	

== M ==
Name	Notability	References
John MacAdam	Roads	
Luke Livingston Macassey	Irish water engineer	
Thomas Harris MacDonald	Highway engineer	
Sir John Benjamin Macneill	Railways	
William Mahone	Plank road, railways	
Hélène Mallebrancke	Second World War Allied telecommunications networks, first female Belgian civil engineer to graduate from the University of Ghent	
Robert Maillart	Swiss, concrete bridges	
Charles Manby	Steamship navigation	
Fred Mannering	Statistical analysis of highway safety data, Highway engineering	
Robert Manning	Open channel flow	
James Mansergh	English railway, water supply and sewage engineer	
Javier Manterola	Spanish bridge engineer	
Mao Yisheng	Chinese structural engineer; expert on bridge construction	
William Marriott	English railway engineer	
James Barney Marsh	American concrete bridge engineer	
Timothy P. Marshall	Failure analysis, wind and impact engineering, meteorologist; co-developer of Enhanced Fujita Scale	
William Matthews	British harbour engineer	
Jorge Matute Remus	Mexican, known for moving a 1700-ton building in 1950	
Guy Maunsell	British, pre-stressed concrete in bridges, Maunsell Forts	
William Maw	British railway engineer	
Sir Henry Maybury	British railway and highways engineer	
John Robinson McClean	British engineer, railways, water supply	
Conde McCullough	Bridges	
Scott McMorrow	Playwright, poet, and engineer	
George Matthew McNaughton	British hydraulic engineer	
Carl Friedrich Meerwein	German, aviation	
Montgomery C. Meigs Jr.	Waterways (American; 1847–1931)	
Charles Meik	Ports, railways, hydroelectric schemes	
Patrick Meik	Ports, railways	
Thomas Meik	Ports, railways	
Concepción Mendizábal Mendoza	First woman in Mexico to earn a civil engineering degree	
Christian Menn	Swiss, known for bridges, including the Leonard P. Zakim Bunker Hill Bridge, part of the Big Dig in Boston	
John Miller	19th-century Edinburgh-based railway engineer (Grainger & Miller)	
Charles Joseph Minard	French civil engineer noted for his inventions in the field of information graphics	
Ralph Modjeski	Polish-American bridge designer	
Otto Mohr	Bridges, railways	
Leon Moisseiff	American suspension bridge engineer	
Guilford Lindsey Molesworth	English railway engineer	
John Monash	Bridges and precast concrete; also Commander of the Australian Corps in World War I	
Riccardo Morandi	Bridges	
Ben Moreell	Four-star Admiral and father of the US Navy Seabees	
Charles Langbridge Morgan	British civil engineer	
James Morgan	Regent's Canal	
Trudy Morgan	Sierra Leone engineer, first woman president of Sierra Leone Institution of Engineers	
George S. Morison	American railway bridge engineer	
Thomas William Moseley	American engineer	
Basil Mott	Mines, tunnels, bridges	
Reginald Mountain	British hydroelectric engineer	
Sir Alan Muir Wood	British tunnelling engineer	
Jean M. Muller	French bridge engineer	

== N ==
Name	Notability	References
Gabriel Narutowicz	Polish engineer, hydroelectrician, a professor at the Polytechnic Institute in Zurich, the first president of the Second Polish Republic	
Tiff Needell	British racing driver and television presenter	
Pier Luigi Nervi	Italian architect and engineer; thin shell concrete	
James Newlands	first Borough Engineer for Liverpool Corporation, the first in the United Kingdom	
Olaf Nordhagen	Norwegian engineer, designed the Bergen Public Library in Jugendstil	
Émile Nouguier	Co-designer of the Eiffel Tower	

== O ==
Name	Notability	References
Thomas Oakes	Chief Engineer of the Schuylkill Canal	
Charles Yelverton O'Connor	Fremantle Harbour and the Goldfields Water Supply Scheme, Western Australia	
Tinius Olsen	Norwegian American engineer and inventor, founder of the Tinius Olsen Engineering Testing Machine Company	
Rowland Mason Ordish	Designer of the St Pancras railway station arch roof	
Ou Chin-der	Taiwanese railway engineer and public official	
Benjamin Outram	Canals	

== P ==
Name	Notability	References
William N. Page	Railways, mining	
Alberto Palacio	Spanish architect and engineer	
Frederick Palmer	Dockyards	
F.W.J. Palmer	British civil engineer, structural engineer, surveyor and architect	
William Barclay Parsons		
Alastair Craig Paterson	Mechanical engineer, later President of IStructE and ICE	
Evgeny Paton	Ukrainian welding engineer	
Sir Angus Paton	British dam engineer	
Ralph Brazelton Peck	Civil and geotechnical engineer	
Manuel Pellegrini	Manager of Manchester City Football Club	
Thomas Penson	Scottish engineer and surveyor	
Florentino Pérez	President of Grupo ACS, president of Real Madrid CF	
Jean-Rodolphe Perronet	French architect and engineer	
Samuel Morton Peto	Railways, harbours	
Henry Petroski	Failure analysis	
George F. Pinder	American environmental and civil engineer, and mathematician	
Rafael del Pino	President of Ferrovial, billionaire	
Henry Pleasants	Civil War general	
James Madison Porter III	Engineer of the Northampton Street Bridge	
William Henry Preece	Telegraphic engineer	
Lavr Proskuryakov	Russian bridge engineer	

== Q ==
Name	Notability	References
Allan Quartermaine	British civil engineer	
Valentina Quiroga	Former Undersecretary of Education, Chilean civil engineer	

== R ==
Name	Notability	References
Thomas Webster Rammell	Inventor, promoter and constructor of the pneumatic system of railway propulsion	
Fidel V. Ramos	Former President of the Philippines, civil engineer	
William John Macquorn Rankine	Physicist; civil engineering professor; developed structural engineering and lateral earth pressure theories	
Kanuri Lakshmana Rao	Water resource engineer, architect of Nagarajuna Sagar Dam, India	
Latif Rashid	Iraqi Minister of Water Resources	
Robert Rawlinson	English canal engineer and sanitarian	
Mike Reader	English civil engineer and MP	
Richard Redmayne	British mining and civil engineer	
Donald Reeve	British hydraulic engineer	
Markus Reiner	Studied deformation, strain and flow, coined "rheology"	
James Meadows Rendel	Bridges, harbours	
John Rennie the Elder	Canals, bridges, docks	
John Rennie the Younger	Railways and bridges, son of John Rennie the Elder	
Louis-Jean Résal	French bridge engineer	
Osborne Reynolds	Fluid dynamics theories; worked as a practising engineer	
Peter Rice	Structural engineer	
Pierre-Paul Riquet	Engineer of the Canal du Midi	
Benjamin S. Roberts	Railways, United States and Russia	
David Gwilym Morris Roberts	British civil engineer	
Donald Van Norman Roberts	Civil and geotechnical engineer, advocate and pioneer in sustainable developments in engineering	
Leslie E. Robertson	Structural engineer	
Vernon Robertson	British civil engineer	
John August Roebling	Brooklyn Bridge, Niagara Railway Suspension Bridge, John A. Roebling Suspension Bridge	
Washington Roebling	Brooklyn Bridge, son of John August Roebling	
Richard Birdsall Rogers	Designer of the Peterborough Lift Lock, Ontario, Canada	
Albert Francis Ronalds	Australian civil engineer	
Alexander Ross	Scottish railway engineer	
Norman Rowntree	British water engineer	
Toni Rüttimann	Swiss bridge builder	
Oleksandr Ivanovych Rzhepishevsky	Ukrainian civil engineer and architect, author of over 20 buildings in Kharkiv	

== S ==
Name	Notability	References
Herbert Saffir	Co-developer of Saffir–Simpson Hurricane Scale	
Anghel Saligny	Designer of the Anghel Saligny Bridge	
Araceli Sánchez Urquijo	first Spanish female civil engineer and Niños de Rusia (Children of Russia)	
John L. Savage	Dams, canals and hydroelectricity power plants	
Leopold Halliday Savile	British reservoir engineer	
Jörg Schlaich	German structural engineer	
Charles Conrad Schneider	American engineer	
Marc Seguin	Railways, inventor of the wire-cable suspension bridge	
Kanwar Sen	Indian canal engineer	
Francisco J. Serrano	Mexican civil engineer and professor	
Edward S. Shaw	American civil engineer in New England	
Frank H. Shaw	American engineer from Pennsylvania	
Shen Kuo	Irrigation canal system	
Hubert Shirley-Smith	Bridges	
Douglas Harlow Shoemaker	American railway engineer	
Vladimir Shukhov	Russian pioneer of hyperboloid structures, shell structures and pipelines	
James Simpson	Hydraulic engineer	
Ole Singstad	Holland Tunnel tunnel ventilation system	
Sir Alec Skempton	A founding father of soil mechanics	
Otto Skorzeny	SS commando	
Carlos Slim	Mexican tycoon, owner of Grupo Carso and Telmex	
John Smeaton	Canals, bridges, Eddystone Lighthouse	
William Smith	Canals, water engineer and publisher of first geological map	
José Sócrates	Former Prime Minister of Portugal	
Evelyna Bloem Souto	Brazilian engineer and academic, only woman in the first class of the civil engineering course at the University of São Paulo in São Carlos.	
George F. Sowers	Geotechnical engineer	
E. Sreedharan	Indian civil engineer, CMD of Delhi Metro Rail Corporation and Chief of Konkan Railway Project	
Olaf Stang	Norwegian suspension bridge engineer	
Thomas Steers	Early 18th-century British canal engineer	
David B. Steinman	American structural engineer	
George Stephenson	Railways	
George Robert Stephenson	British railway engineer	
Henry Palfrey Stephenson	British bridge, railway and gas lighting engineer	
Robert Stephenson	Railways	
John Frank Stevens	Chief Engineer of the Panama Canal	
Alan Stevenson	lighthouses	
David Stevenson	Lighthouses	
Robert Stevenson	Lighthouses	
Thomas Stevenson	Lighthouses	
Simon Stevin	Flemish public works engineer	
Joseph Strauss	Structural engineer, Golden Gate Bridge, San Francisco	
Emil Strub	Swiss railway engineer	
Sukarno	Former President of Indonesia	

== T ==
Name	Notability	References
Ratan Tata	Chairman of Indian conglomerate Tata Group	
William Tebeau	Engineer at the Oregon Department of Transportation and first African-American to graduate from Oregon State University	
Thomas Telford	Canals, roads and bridges	
Karl von Terzaghi	Soil mechanics	
Tidjane Thiam	Chief Financial Officer of Prudential plc, civil engineering graduate of l'École Nationale Supérieure des Mines de Paris	
Mat Roy Thompson	American landscape and defense engineer, overseer of construction at Scotty's Castle	
John Edward Thornycroft	British ship builder and president of the Institution of Civil Engineers	
Stephen Timoshenko	Engineering mechanics	
Pierre Emanuel Tirard	19th-century Prime Minister of France	
Fritz Todt	Reichsminister for Armaments and Munitions during World War II	
Eduardo Torroja	Spanish concrete-shell engineer	
Joseph Treffry	Harbour and bridge engineer	
Ernest Crosbie Trench	British railway engineer	
James Trubshaw	British architect and engineer	
Alexis Tsipras	Prime Minister of Greece	
George Turnbull	British railway engineer, Chief engineer 1850s 600 miles Indian railways	
C.A.P. Turner	American structural engineer	

== U ==
Name	Notability	References
Kim Ung-yong	Korean former child prodigy, specialized in hydraulics	
Raymond Unwin	British urban planner	
William Unwin	President of the Institution of Civil Engineers and the Institution of Mechanical Engineers	

== V ==
Name	Notability	References
Jean Venables	Flooding engineer; first woman President of ICE	
Charles Blacker Vignoles	British railway engineer	
Michel Virlogeux	French; second Tagus crossing and Millau viaduct	
Sir Mokshagundam Visvesvarayya	"Father of Indian civil engineering"; dams in India, many projects in Mysore state	
Jean-Baptiste de Voglie	Italian road and bridge engineer	
Alan Voorhees	American transport engineer and urban planner	

== W ==
Name	Notability	References
John Waddell	Scottish railway engineer	
John Alexander Low Waddell	American bridge designer	
James Walker	Scottish coastal engineer	
Ralph Walker	Scottish-born harbour engineer	
William Kelly Wallace	Irish railway engineer	
Kaichi Watanabe	Japanese bridge engineer	
Juan Carlos Wasmosy	President of Paraguay	
André Waterkeyn	Designed the Atomium	
John Duncan Watson	British sewage treatment engineer	
David Mowat Watson	British civil engineer	
Ray Wedgwood	Australian civil engineer and bridge designer	
Francis Wentworth-Shields	British civil engineer	
William Weston	British bridge engineer	
Thomas Johnson Westropp	Irish harbour engineer and antiquarian	
William Henry Wheeler	English harbour engineer and antiquarian	
Squire Whipple	American civil engineer	
Frederick Arthur Whitaker	British Admiralty engineer	
Canvass White	American canal engineer	
William Henry White	British engineer and chief constructor of the Admiralty	
John Richardson Wigham	Irish lighthouse engineer	
Clement Wilks	Australian road and bridge engineer	
William Willcocks	British irrigation engineer; served in India and Egypt	
Edward Leader Williams	Canals, bridges	
George Ambler Wilson	British port engineer	
J. W. Wilson	British designer of piers; founded Crystal Palace School of Engineering	
Norman D. Wilson	Mass transit	
Frank E. Winsor	Chief engineer for Quabbin Reservoir project	
John Wolfe-Barry	English civil engineer, constructor of London's Tower Bridge	
A. Baldwin Wood	Pumps	
Edward Woods	British railway engineer	
William Barton Worthington	British railway engineer	
Robert Wynne-Edwards	British tunnel and pipeline engineer	

== X ==
Name / Notability / References; Ximen Bao / Ancient Chinese canal engineer

== Y ==
Name	Notability	References
Yu the Great 大禹	First Dynast of China, founder of the first dynasty, who dedicated his life establishing flood control structures across the Chinese Hegemony, establishing the new hegemony in the process, across flood ruined competing kingdoms.	
Andrew Yarranton	English navigation engineer	
Boris Yeltsin	Former President of Russia	
Thomas Yeoman	First President of Society of Civil Engineers	
T. Leslie Youd	Geotechnical engineer, liquefaction research	

== Z ==
Name	Notability	References
Olgierd Zienkiewicz	Academic, noted author and pioneer of finite element analysis	
William V. Zinn	Responsible for the Merrion Centre, Leeds, and author of works of Buddhist philosophy	
Konrad Zuse	Early pioneer in computers	
