= Shepherd-Barron =

Shepherd-Barron is a surname. Notable people with the surname include:

- Dorothy Shepherd-Barron (1897–1953), British tennis player
- John Shepherd-Barron (1925–2010), inventor and developer of the cash machine or ATM; son of Wilfred Shepherd-Barron
- Nicholas Shepherd-Barron (born 1955), mathematician; son of John Shepherd-Barron
- Wilfred Shepherd-Barron (1888–1979), civil engineer
