= Frank Baron =

Frank Baron may refer to:

- Frank Baron (civil engineer) (1914–1994), American professor of civil engineering
- Frank Baron (politician) (1923–2016), Dominica politician

== See also ==
- Frank Barron (disambiguation)
