= Robert Hogan (psychologist) =

American psychologist (born 1937)

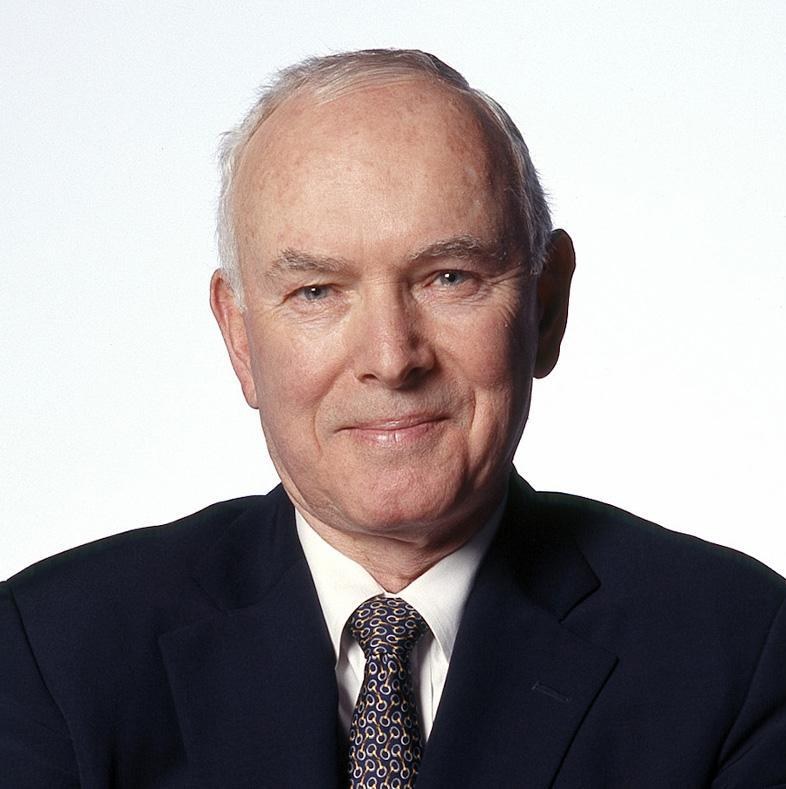
- Born: September 4, 1937 (age 89); Los Angeles, California, U.S.
- Education: University of California, Los Angeles (BA); University of California, Berkeley (PhD)
- Known for: Personality testing
- Spouses: Lora J. Head (m. 1960; div. 1973) Joyce Hogan (m. 1974; died 2012) Wendy Hogan (m. 2014)
- Scientific career
- Fields: Psychology
- Workplaces: Johns Hopkins University; University of Tulsa; Hogan Assessment Systems

Robert Hogan (born September 4, 1937) is an American personality psychologist and organizational psychologist known for developing socioanalytic theory, which fuses psychoanalytic theory, role theory, and evolutionary theory. Hogan is the president of Hogan Assessment Systems, which he co-founded in 1987. He is the author of three widely used personality inventories—the Hogan Personality Inventory; the Hogan Development Survey; and the Motives, Values, Preferences Inventory—along with more than 300 scholarly articles, chapters, and books.

== Biography ==
=== Personal life and early work ===
Hogan was born in Los Angeles, California, on September 4, 1937. He graduated from Fontana High School in Fontana, California.

Hogan studied physics and engineering at University of California, Riverside. Then he attended the University of California, Los Angeles (UCLA) on a Naval Reserve Officers Training Corps (NROTC) scholarship, where he graduated Phi Beta Kappa and summa cum laude in 1960. Hogan was awarded a Rhodes Scholarship but was unable to accept it due to his marriage and military enlistment.

After graduating from UCLA, Hogan served in the United States Navy. He spent three years as the gunnery officer on the USS Gregory (DD-802), patrolling the Taiwan Strait.

Then, from 1963 to 1964, he worked as a probation officer in San Bernardino County, California, before deciding to pursue additional education.

His experiences in the criminal justice system and the military created a lifetime interest in moral development and leadership, the topics that form the bulk of his scholarly work.

=== Psychology career ===
In 1964, Hogan enrolled in the PhD psychology program at University of California, Berkeley. At Berkeley, he met many of the great personality psychologists of the WWII generation: Hans Eysenck, Raymond Cattell, Henry Murray, John Bowlby, Jack Block, Donald MacKinnon, Frank Barron, Harrison Gough, and John Holland.

Hogan joined the faculty at Johns Hopkins University in 1967, where he became professor of psychology and social relations. In 1982, he was named McFarlin professor and chair of the psychology department at the University of Tulsa, where he developed PhD programs in IO and clinical psychology.

In 1987, Hogan and his late wife, Dr. Joyce Hogan (d. 2012), cofounded Hogan Assessment Systems. In 2001, Hogan left the University of Tulsa to focus full-time on the company. He remains president of the Oklahoma-headquartered organization, which uses valid and reliable proprietary personality assessments to provide data-driven talent insights to organizations around the globe.

== Ideas ==
=== Socioanalytic theory ===
Hogan's socioanalytic theory is the foundation for his eponymous personality inventories and has been studied extensively in relation to job performance and promotion criteria.

Socioanalytic theory fuses Sigmund Freud’s psychoanalytic theory and role theory (Mead, 1932) with evolutionary theory (Darwin, 1856). Whereas Freud believed that how we think about ourselves determines how we interact with others, role theory argues that our interactions with others determine how we think about ourselves. Both theories predict that many of us will have trouble in these areas—and we will not know why. Hogan’s socioanalytic theory concerns three questions: (1) in what meaningful ways are people alike—human universals; (2) in what meaningful ways are people different—individual differences; and (3) how to explain anomalous or self-defeating behavior.

==== Human universals and individual differences ====
Hogan’s socioanalytic theory centers three major themes regarding human universals: (1) people always live in groups; (2) every group has a status hierarchy; and (3) every group has a religion. These themes are driven by biology and reflect the most central human motives. First, people seek social acceptance and approval, and they find criticism and social rejection existentially threatening. In the history of the species, being expelled from one’s group was a death sentence. Second, normal people have deep needs for status, power, and the control of resources and they find the loss of status existentially threatening. In the history of the species, losing status was a major threat to survival. Third, normal people have deep needs for structure, meaning, and purpose in their lives—which religion provides. A loss of meaning is, by definition, existential despair (cf. Frankl, 1959). Consequently, socioanalytic theory argues that life is about the search for social acceptance, status, and meaning, and most of life’s problems concern the possibility of losing these resources.

Concerning individual differences, Hogan theorizes that people differ in the degree to which they need social acceptance, status, and meaning. Although most people need acceptance and approval, status and power, and structure and meaning, huge individual differences exist in their ability to acquire these resources. Some people are more famous than others; some people are richer than others; and some people have more meaningful lives than others. Socioanalytic theory tries to explain these individual differences.

==== Social interactions ====
Hogan’s theory holds that people are group-living animals, and life is one social interaction after another. Hogan makes six key points to this effect: First, social interaction involves the exchange of goods (affection, money, etc.) to achieve our life’s goals—interaction is where the action is. Second, to interact, people need agendas to pursue and roles to play. The agendas and the roles range from informal (having a drink with a friend) to formal (a wedding with assigned roles). Third, more than one agenda is always in play. Fourth, people in the same roles play their roles differently—which is where personality comes in. Fifth, individual differences affect both agendas and roles. These determine people’s ability to create the agendas for social interaction, or to recognize what agendas are in play, and they determine how people play their assigned roles. Finally, after every interaction, people gain or lose a little respect and affection and gain or lose a little status and power. Popularity and status are the result of repeated interactions.

==== Identity versus reputation ====
A person’s identity is the generic role they bring to every social interaction, but his or her reputation is the cumulative effect of these repeated social interactions. Whereas identity is the person you think you are and would like others to believe you are, reputation is the version of you that other people know. A person’s reputation is built up by their dealings with others. After each social interaction, people evaluate each other, and sometimes, they gossip. Gossip, Hogan says, pervades social networks so that people someone has never met already know about that person’s reputation.

This distinction—identity versus reputation—is central to Hogan’s approach to personality and job performance. According to Hogan, reputation is what truly determines a person’s career success. People can pursue self-knowledge through various self-discovery processes, but Hogan, drawing from Freud, argues that identity is always merely made up. Reputation, however, is reliable knowledge. This means that measures of identity are weak predictors of career outcomes, whereas measures of reputation are strong predictors of career outcomes. The best predictor of future behavior is past behavior, reputation is the best data source available regarding past behavior, and therefore reputation is the best data source available regarding future behavior. Consequently, career success depends not on understanding yourself, but on understanding how others evaluate you. Hogan’s concept of strategic self-awareness requires understanding your reputation and how your behavior affects it.

==== The bright and dark sides of personality ====
Hogan coined the bright side of personality and the dark side of personality to explain how reputation is multifaceted. The bright side refers to how people behave when they are on stage, and the dark side refers to how people behave when facing stress, pressure, or boredom. Dark-side behaviors are extreme versions of bright-side behaviors, as when self-assertion gives way to bullying or charm becomes duplicity. Dark-side behaviors allow people to win single interactions, but over time they ruin relationships. Nonetheless, Hogan asserts that dark side behaviors are what cause people to stand out and be noticed. Everyone has dark-side tendencies, but the more talented someone is, the more prominent the dark-side tendencies are likely to be.

=== On leadership ===
Socioanalytic theory informs Hogan’s perspective on organizational leadership. Humans evolved as group-living animals who compete in two primary ways: within groups for status and mates and between groups for survival. Because warfare is a human universal, Hogan defines leadership as the ability to build and maintain a team that can outperform its competition—and therefore survive.

In the modern business world, most discussions define leadership in terms of the people at the tops of organizations. In Hogan’s perspective, people at the tops of organizations are political survivors who may or may not have talent for leadership. Citing data on the base rate of managerial incompetence in public and private sector organizations (65% to 75%), Hogan suggests it is a mistake to define leadership in terms of the people in charge. Instead, leadership should be defined and evaluated in terms of the performance of the group, team, or organization. According to Hogan, leadership is a resource for the group, not a source of privilege for the leader.

=== On job performance ===
Building on his distinction between identity and reputation, Hogan developed a socioanalytic perspective on job performance. Performance evaluation, he observed, depends on workplace interactions, after which each person will assess how rewarding the other person was to deal with. According to Hogan, rewardingness—being interesting and agreeable, meeting the other person’s expectations, satisfying their desires, and promoting their agenda—forms the basis for performance appraisal.

Expanding on the five-factor model of personality, Hogan identified seven dimensions as an initial taxonomy of personality variables needed to predict job performance, which formed the foundation of the Hogan Personality Inventory (HPI). Well-constructed measures of personality predict appropriately matched elements of job performance. Job performance is ultimately a function of the perceptions of others.

=== On trait theory ===
Following Gordon Allport, many modern psychologists define personality in terms of traits: enduring neuropsychic structures that shape individual thoughts, emotions, and behaviors in characteristic ways.

Hogan criticizes trait theory for two reasons. First, neuropsychic structures are the subject matter of neuropsychology, not personality psychology. Second, trait theory conflates prediction with explanation and is, therefore, tautological. For example, we can predict that Mike Tyson, former world heavyweight champion, will behave aggressively when provoked. Trait theory explains this by saying that Tyson has a trait for aggression—and that is a tautology.

According to Hogan, trait terms are essential for describing and predicting behavior. In this regard, they form the structure of reputation—people describe the reputations of others using trait terms. But we should explain behavior in terms of an actor’s intentions which are related to his or her identity. Mike Tyson’s aggressiveness sends signals to others about how he wants to be regarded—i.e., aggressiveness is a key part of his identity. People unconsciously use their identities as the basis for negotiating for acceptance and status during social interaction. Like Mike Tyson, people often make identity choices that derail relationships and careers. Fixing those choices is what coaching and psychotherapy are all about.

=== On equity and fairness in personnel selection ===
Hogan’s research on personality and job performance began in the wake of the Civil Rights Act of 1964. In the years leading up to the Civil Rights Act and the subsequent formation of the Equal Employment Opportunity Commission in 1973, psychologists favored measures of cognitive ability as the best predictor of occupational performance—even though cognitive ability measures discriminated against minority groups in employment selection.

Hogan and his colleagues pioneered the use of personality measures to promote equity and fairness in personnel selection. Specifically, they provided conclusive evidence that well-constructed measures of personality predict performance in every job in the US economy, and they do not discriminate against any group of job applicants. Members of minority groups do not get scores that are better or worse than members of majority groups, whether those groups are defined on grounds of race, sex, age, gender identity, or sexual orientation.

== Publications ==
His book Personality and the Fate of Organizations was published by Lawrence Erlbaum Associates in June 2006. The 167-page book discusses Hogan's theories on the nature of personality and suggests how his theory can guide organizations' employment decisions. He is the co-editor of Handbook of Personality Psychology. He has also published the Hogan Personality Inventory; the Hogan Development Survey; the Motives, Values, Preferences Inventory; the Hogan Business Reasoning Inventory, and Hogan Guide (2007). In 2012, he and Gordon Curphy authored The Rocket Model.

=== Selected bibliography ===
- Hogan, R. (1983). A socioanalytic theory of personality. Nebraska Symposium on Motivation. Nebraska Symposium on Motivation, 55–89.
- Hogan, R., DeSoto, C. B., & Solano, C. (1977). Traits, tests, and personality research. American Psychologist, 32(4), 255–264.
- Hogan, R. (2007). Personality and the Fate of Organizations. Mahwah, NJ: Lawrence Erlbaum Associates.
- Hogan, R., & Blickle, G. (2018). "Socioanalytic theory: Basic concepts, supporting evidence, and practical implications". In V. Zeigler-Hill & TK. Shackleford (Eds.). Sage Handbook of Personality and Individual Differences. New York: Sage. Pp. 110–129.
- Hogan, R., & Chamorro-Premuzic, T. "Personality and the laws of history". In T. Chamorro-Premuzic (ed.), The Wiley-Blackwell handbook of individual differences. London: Wiley-Blackwell. Pp 501–521.
- Hogan, R., Curphy, G., & Hogan, J. (1994). "What we know about leadership". American Psychologist, 49, 493–504.
- Hogan, R., Hogan, J. (1995). The Hogan Personality Inventory manual (2nd ed.). Tulsa, OK: Hogan Assessment Systems.
- Hogan, R., Hogan, J. (1997). Hogan Development Survey Manual. Tulsa, OK: Hogan Assessment Systems.
- Hogan, R., Hogan, J., & Roberts, B. W. (1996). Personality measurement and employment decisions: Questions and answers. American Psychologist, 51, 469–477.
- Hogan, R., Raskin, R., Fazzini, D. (1990). "The dark side of charisma". In K. E. Clark & M. B. Clark (Eds.). Measures of leadership. Greensboro: Center for Creative Leadership. Pp. 343–354.
- Hogan, R., Shelton, D. (1998). "A Socioanalytic Perspective on Job Performance". Human Performance, 12, 129–144.
- Hogan, R., Smither, R. (2001). Personality: Theories and Applications. Boulder, CO: Westview Press.
- Hogan, R., Johnson, J. A., & Briggs, S. R. (Eds.). (1997). Handbook of Personality Psychology. San Diego, CA: Academic.
- Roberts, B. W., & Hogan, R. (Eds.), (2001) Personality psychology in the workplace. Washington, DC: American Psychological Association.
- What every student should know about personality psychology. In V. P. Makosky (Ed.), The G. Stanley Hall Lecture Series, Vol. 6. Washington, D.C.: American Psychological Association. pp. 39–64.
- Hogan, R. (1991). Personality and personality assessment. In M. D. Dunnette & L. Hough (Eds.), Handbook of industrial and organizational psychology (2nd ed.). Chicago: Rand McNally. pp. 873–919.
- Moral conduct and moral character. Psychological Bulletin, 1973, 79, 217-232.
- Personality theory: The personological tradition. Englewood Cliffs, NJ: Prentice-Hall, 1976.
- Hogan, R., Hogan, J., & Kaiser, R.W. (2011). Management derailment. In S. Zedeck (Ed.), American Psychological Association Handbook of Industrial/Organizational Psychology. Washington, DC: American Psychological Association. pp. 555–576
- Hogan, R., Kaiser, R.B., Sherman, R., & Harms, P.D. (2021). Twenty years on the dark side: Six lessons about bad leadership. Journal of Consulting Psychology.

== Awards and recognition ==
- Top Assessment and Evaluation Company (Hogan Assessment Systems), Training Industry magazine, 2017–2021
- Fellow, Divisions 5, 8, and 14 American Psychological Association, 1977–present
- Recipient, Dunnette Prize, Society for Industrial and Organizational Psychology, 2022
- Recipient, RHR International Award for Excellence in Consulting Psychology, 2020
- Recipient, Association of Test Publishers (ATP) Career Achievement Award, 2014
- G. Stanley Hall Lecturer in Personality, American Psychological Association, 1985
- Visiting Scientist, Human Factors Laboratory, Naval Training Equipment Center, Orlando, Florida, 1985
- Henry A. Murray Lecturer, Michigan State University, 1985
- Distinguished Visiting Professor, University of British Columbia, 1984
- Distinguished Visiting Professor, Texas Tech University, 1983
- Behavioral Scientist of the Year, Washington Academy of Science, 1978
