= Rogny-les-Sept-Écluses =

- Commune
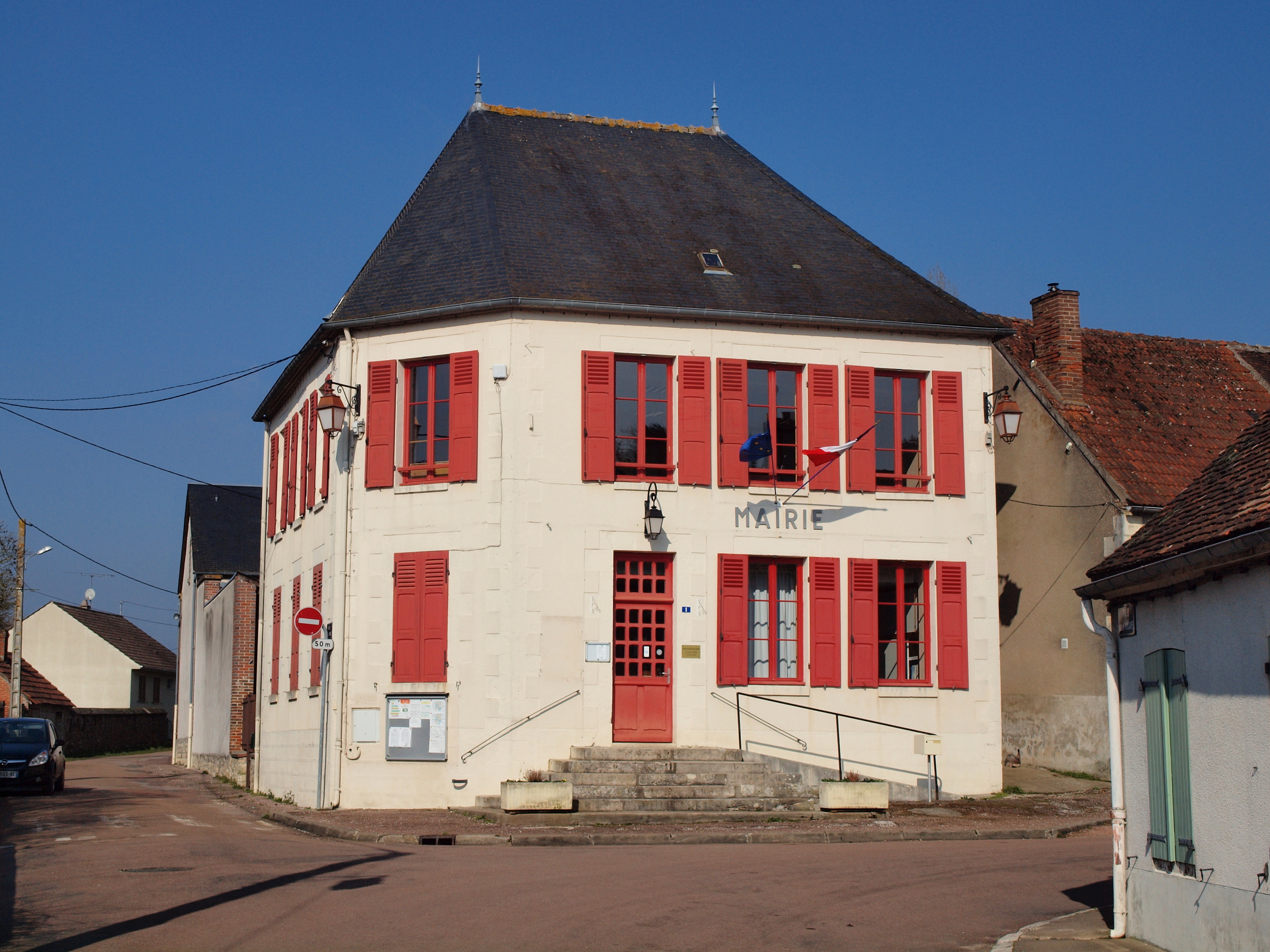
- The town hall in Rogny-les-Sept-Écluses

- Coat of arms
- Location of Rogny-les-Sept-Écluses
- Location within France Location within Bourgogne-Franche-Comté
- Coordinates: 47°44′48″N 2°53′03″E
- Country: France
- Region: Bourgogne-Franche-Comté
- Department: Yonne
- Arrondissement: Auxerre
- Canton: Cœur de Puisaye

Government
  - Mayor (2020–2026): Gérard Foucher
- Area^{1}: 32.59 km^{2} (12.58 sq mi)
- Highest elevation: 186 m (610 ft)
- Lowest elevation: 135 m (443 ft)
- Population (2023): 700
  - Density: 21/km^{2} (56/sq mi)
- Time zone: UTC+01:00 (CET)
  - Summer (DST): UTC+02:00 (CEST)
- INSEE/Postal code: 89324 /89220
- ^{1} French Land Register data, which excludes lakes, ponds, glaciers > 1 km^{2} (0.386 sq mi or 247 acres) and river estuaries.

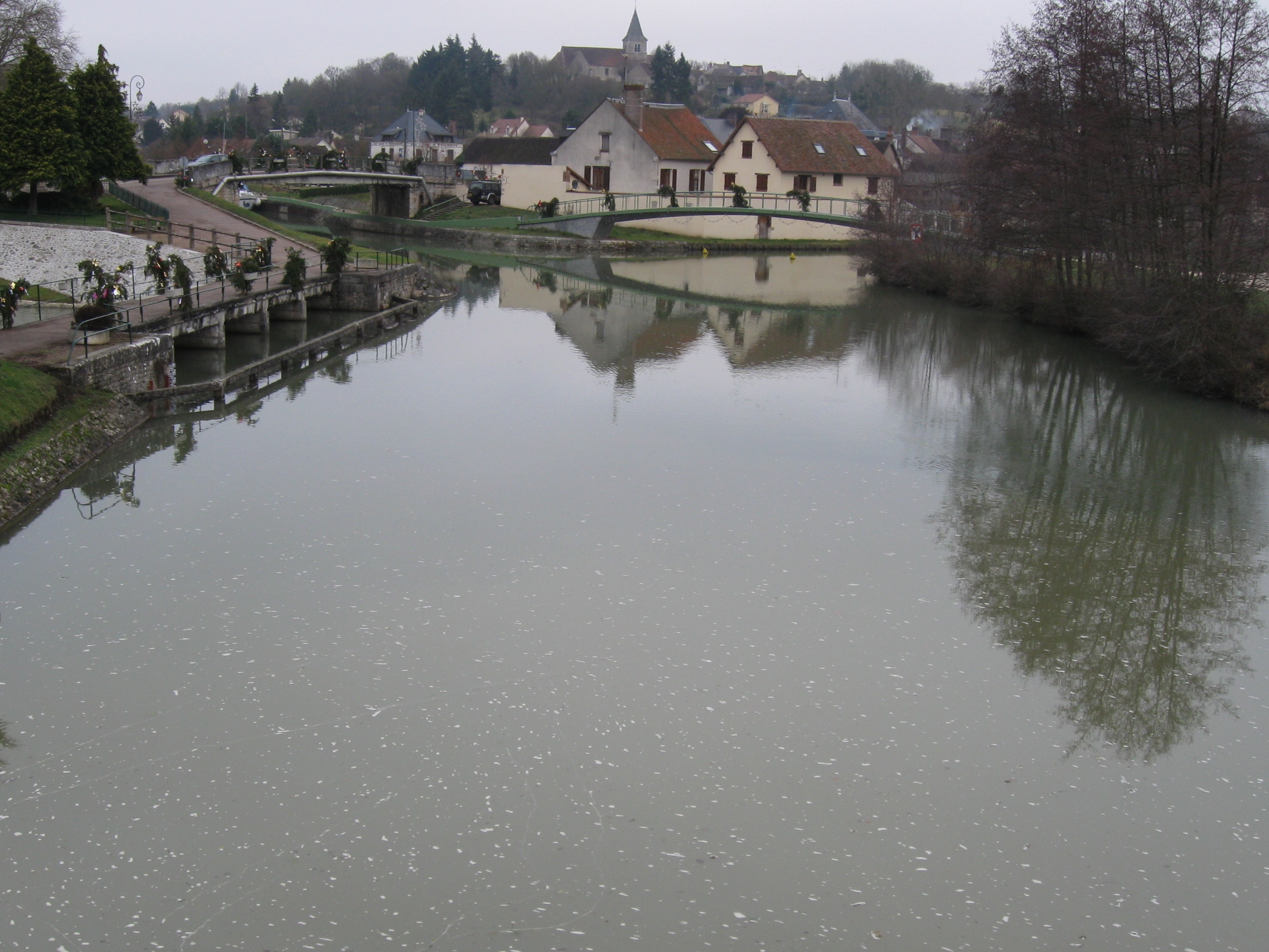
View of Rogny-les-sept-écluses from the canal

Rogny-les-Sept-Écluses (French pronunciation: [ʁɔɲi le sɛt eklyz]) is a commune in the Yonne department in Bourgogne-Franche-Comté in north-central France. The name of the commune comes from its impressive seven locks on Briare Canal.

== Geography ==
The commune is located some 50 km (31 mi) west of Auxerre and is crossed by the Loing and the Briare Canal. It is situated at 20 km north of Gien and 140 km south of Paris. The commune is in the natural area of Puisaye,

== History ==
Rogny-les-sept-écluses was simply known as Rogny before 1978, when the name was changed to mirror its famous monument.

Human settlement in the area dates back to Roman times. Medals and coins bearing the image of the Emperor Constantine (306–337) and the Gaulish tyran Tetricus (268) were found along an ancient Roman road.

In the Middle Ages, the lower part of the village was on wetlands, so most of the villagers lived around the church on the higher part of the village. Written traces from the 11th century indicate that the village now known as Rogny belonged to the Roignacum parish, from where the name could come.

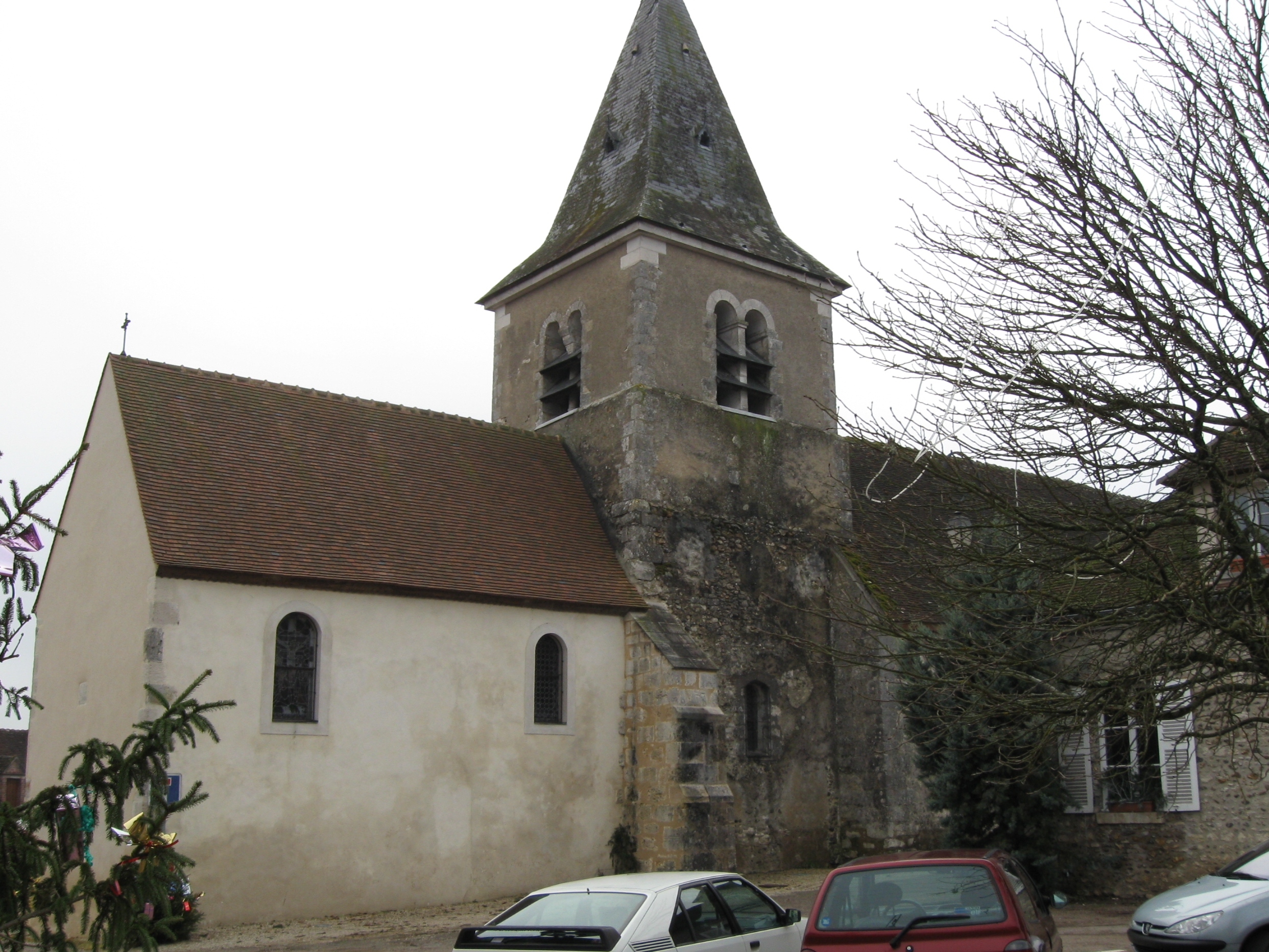
Saint-Loup Church

=== Saint-Loup Church ===
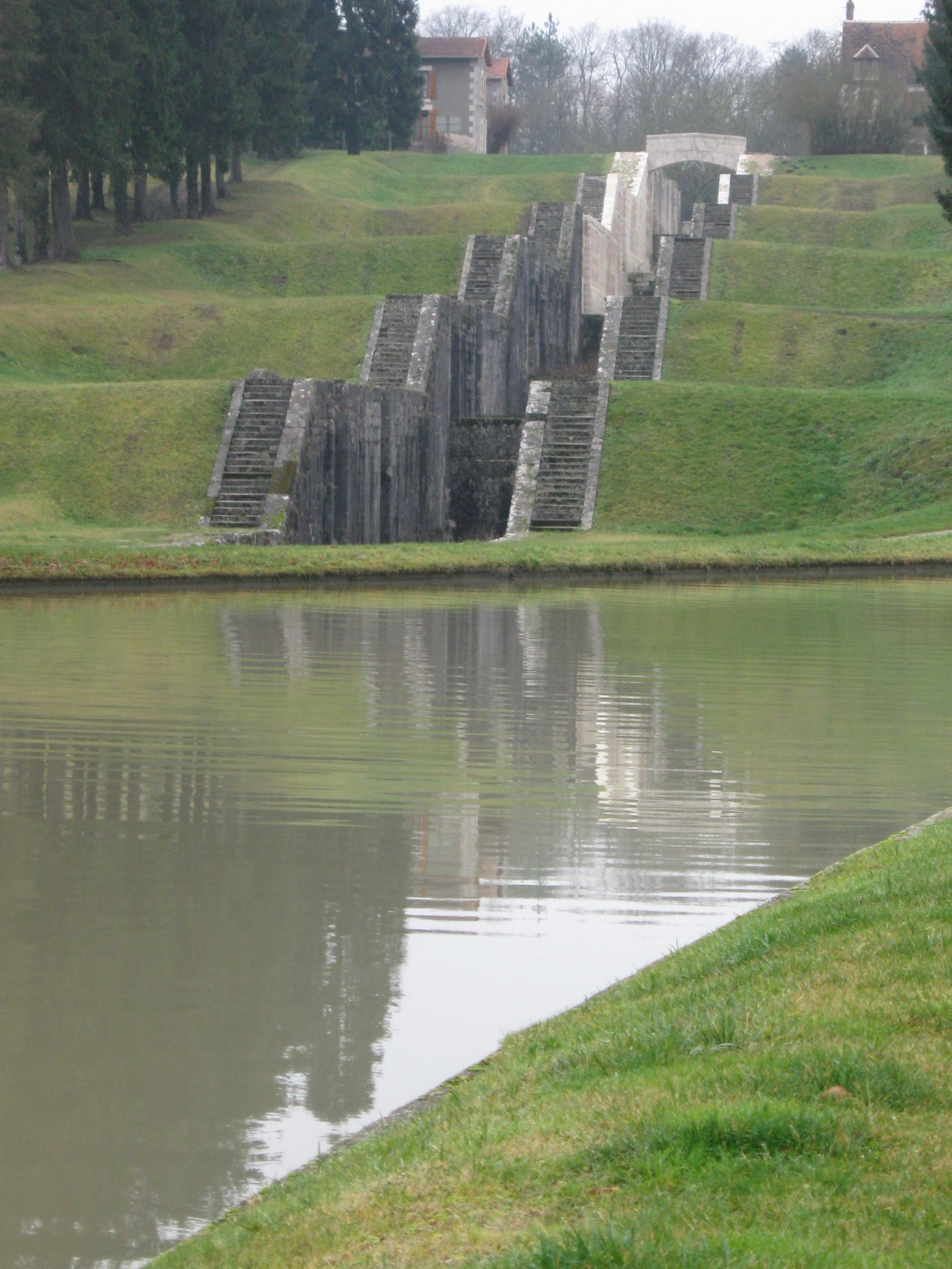
The old staircase of seven locks of the Briare Canal

The church is still on the hill where the historical commune stood and now dominate the village. It was dated 12th century, but the structure was modified many times. The church has kept his Romanesque porch. It is a listed monument. The most remarkable possession of the church is a painting called Les Pèlerins d'Emmaüs from 1757 and designated as historical monument in 1908. It was painted by Adrien Le Beau after Pilgrims at Emmaus by Titian. The bell has a diameter of 1.20 m and is from 1699. It has been dubbed Isabelle.

=== The seven locks and Briare Canal ===
The Briare Canal and its main work, the seven locks (or sept écluses in French), were part of the enormous work of Henry IV and Sully to join the Mediterranean Sea to the English Channel by a network of canals and rivers. The locks were built to join the Loire to the Seine water system.

It was Hugues Cosnier's idea to build six locks (a seventh one was built later) to cross the Vallée du Loing (côte Rogny, hence the name Rogny-les-sept-écluses).

Cosny had chosen Rogny for its work because of the presence of many ponds, and the water was to be used to operate the locks.

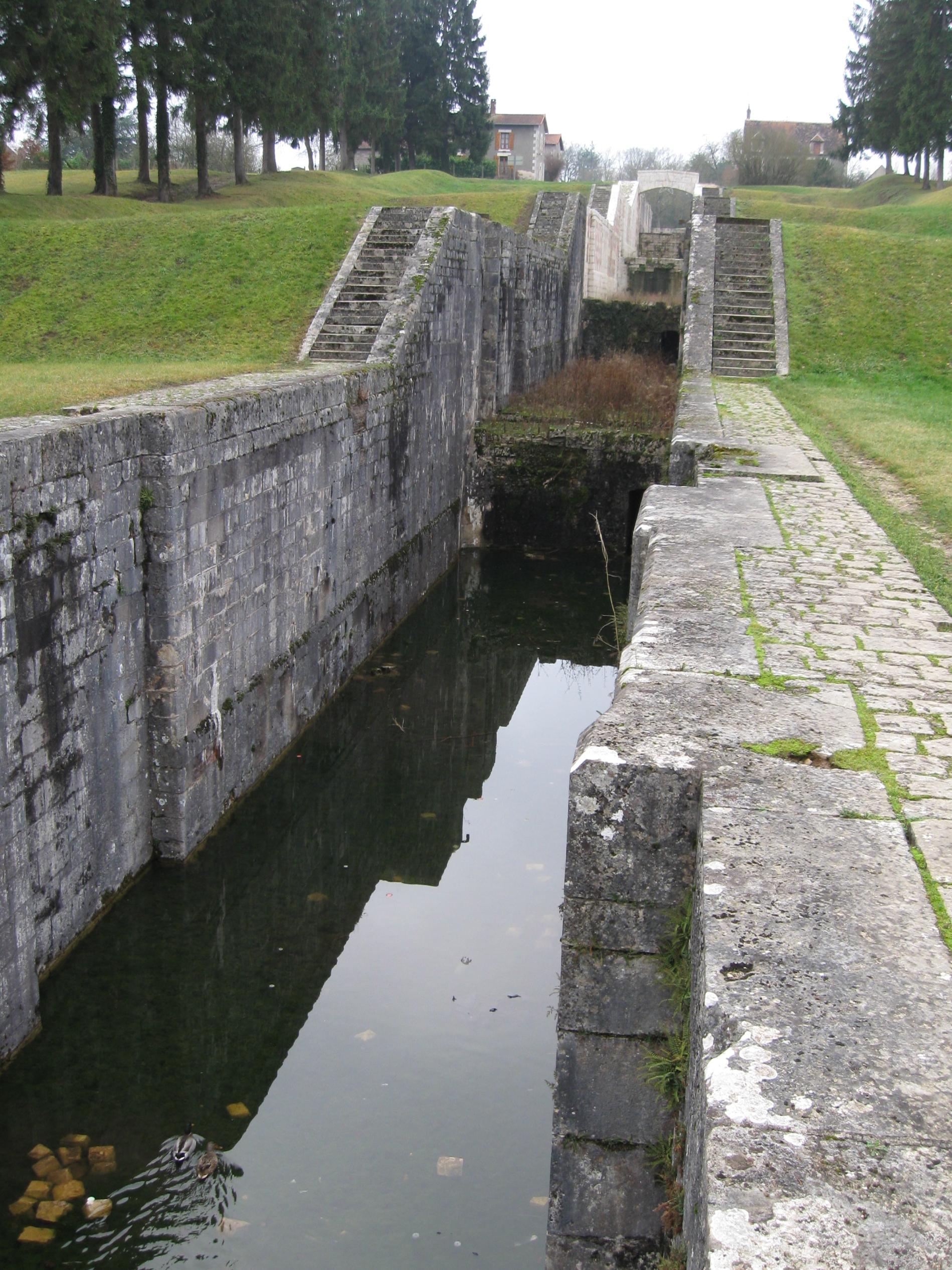
View of the locks, now out of use

Construction for both the locks and the Briare Canal started in 1604, and required next to 12,000 workers, that needed to be housed in the town. To these workers, some 6000 soldiers came to monitor the construction site when the construction was halted during the Thirty Years War. Material theft was a real problem at the time.

The locks and the canal adjacent were finally open for navigation in 1642, under the name "Canal de Loyre en Seyne", before taking the name Briare Canal in 1666. The lock were the first of their kind to be built in France. The life of the villagers was thus linked to navigation in the area, and they were proud to lead the boats on the towpath.

Work was done in 1822 to modernize the locks, but they were closed in 1887, after new ones were built. Each lock is 27 meters long, for a total of 238m, and 4.32 meters wide. They were designated national historical monument in 1983.

== Cultural event ==
Every year since 1967 at the end of July, the commune has held a pyrotechnics show next to the locks. This is also the occasion for musical and comedy performances, before the main event of the fireworks.

== See also ==
- Communes of the Yonne department
