= Étang de la Gazonne =

- Location within France
- Location: Centre-Val de Loire, France
- Coordinates: 47.70030°N 2.84518°E
- Surface area: 29-hectare (72-acre)

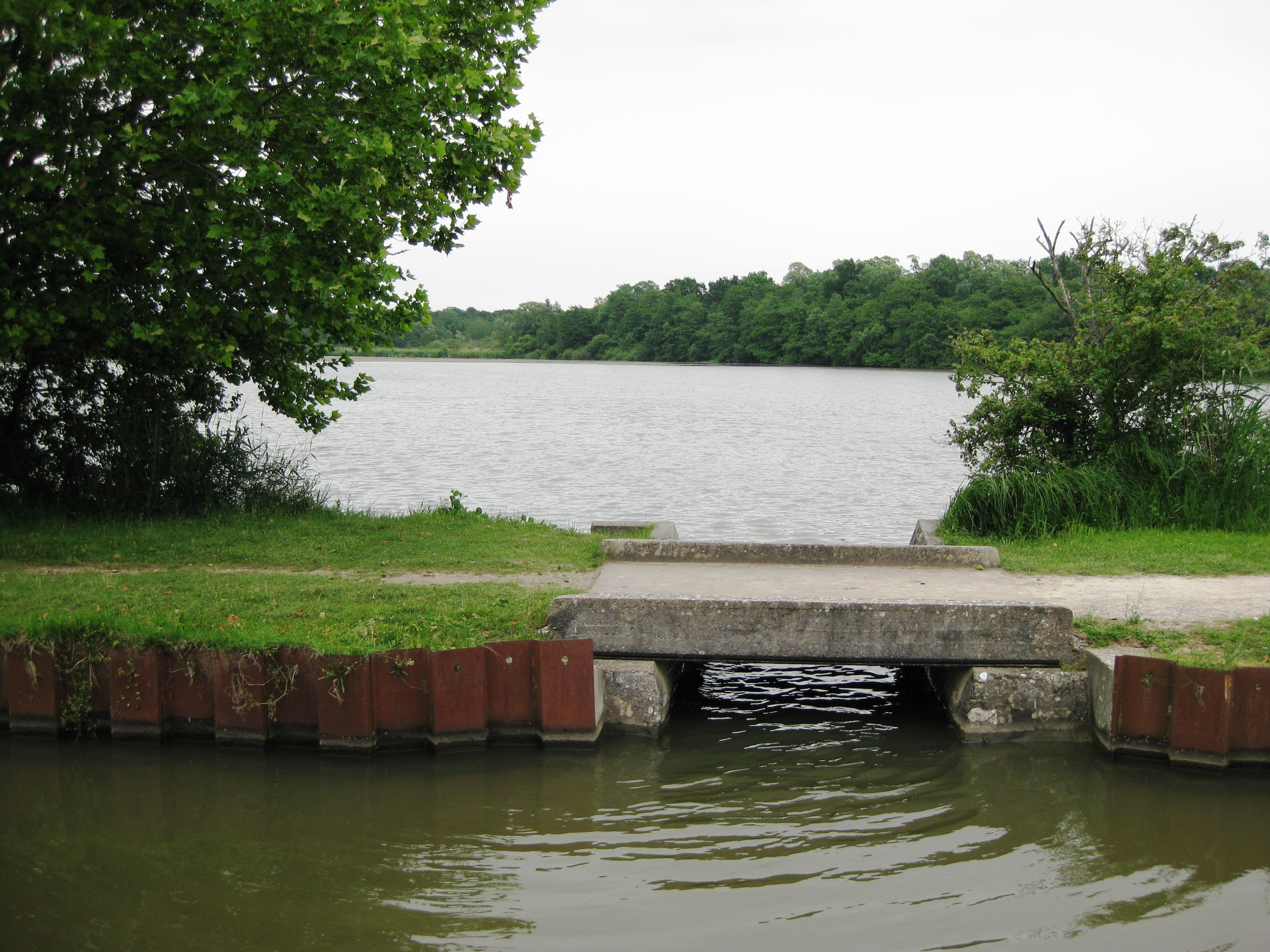
Canal de Briare receives water from the Etang.

Étang de la Gazonne, (English: "Grassy Pond"), is a 29-hectare (72-acre) lake that provides water for the workings of the Canal de Briare.

Hugues Cosnier, designer of the canal, planned a 3.25-mile-long (5 km) waterway from the River Trezée to the Gazonne. The Gazonne acted as a reservoir.
