= Frank Barron =

Frank Barron may refer to:

- Frank Barron (baseball) (1890–1964), Major League Baseball pitcher
- Frank Barron (psychologist) (1922–2002), American psychologist and philosopher
