= Briare Canal =

Canal in central France

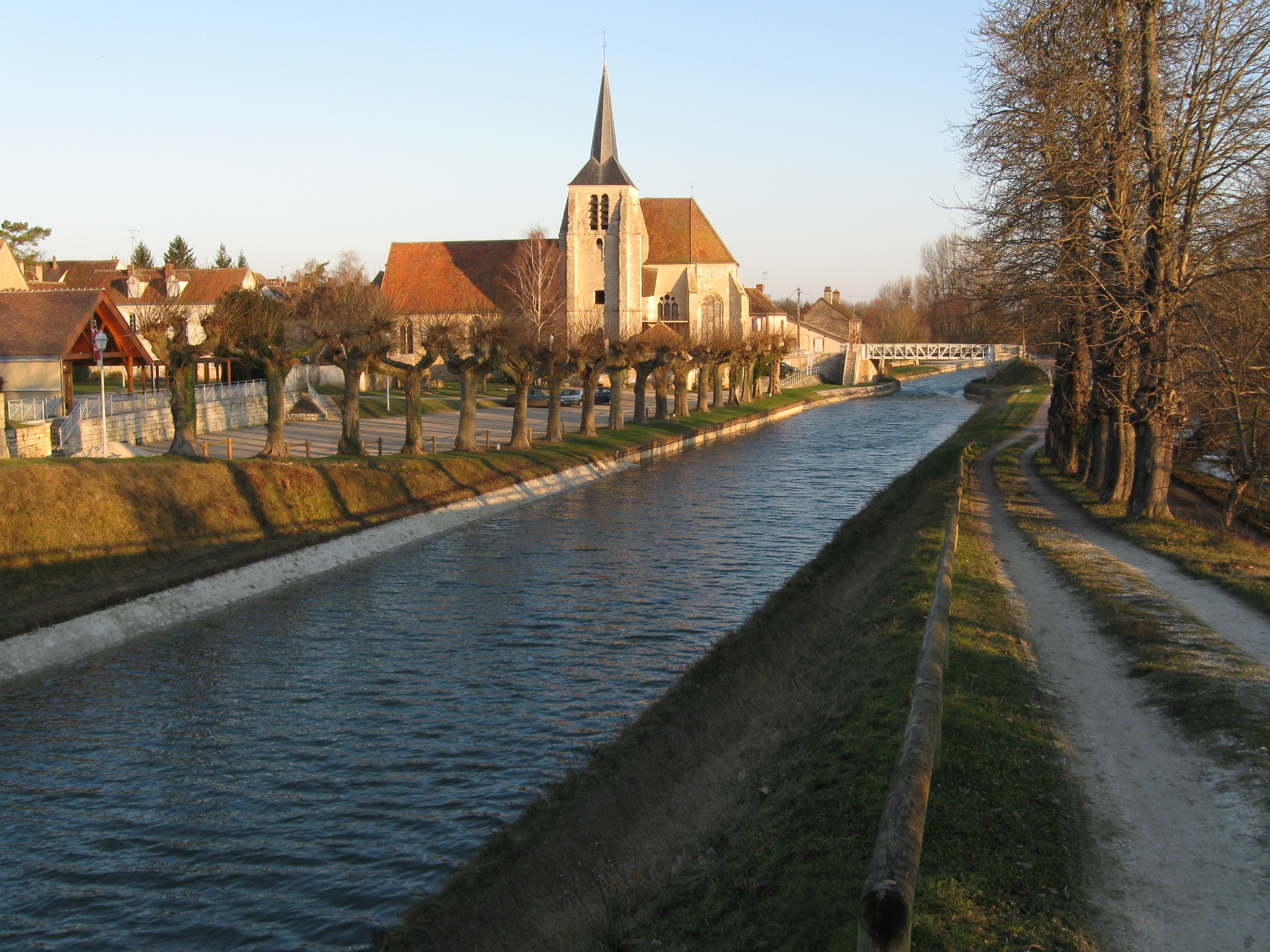
- Briare canal in Montbouy

Specifications
- Length: 57 km (35 mi)
- Locks: 36
- Status: Open

History
- Construction began: 1604
- Date completed: 1642

Geography
- Start point: Briare
- End point: Buges near Montargis
- Beginning coordinates: 47.63899°N 2.72937°E
- Ending coordinates: 48.02821°N 2.72259°E
- Connects to: Canal du Loing and Canal latéral à la Loire

{

The Briare Canal (French: Canal de Briare, pronounced [kanal də bʁijaʁ]) is one of the oldest canals in France. Its construction started in 1604. It was the first summit level canal in Europe that was built using pound locks, connecting the Rhone-Saône and Seine valleys. It is 57 kilometres (35 miles) long and is part of the Bourbonnais route from Saint-Mammès on the Seine to Chalon-sur-Saône on the Saône.

From Briare to Buges, the canal rises through the first 12 locks some 41 m (135 ft) and then falls 85 m (279 ft) through the remaining 24 locks.

== Construction ==
The canal was initiated by Maximilien de Béthune, duc de Sully, with support from Henry IV in order to develop the grain trade, and to reduce food shortages. Its construction started in 1604 and was completed in 1642. Between 6,000 and 12,000 labourers worked on this canal which connects the basins of the rivers Loire and Seine. Hugues Cosnier obtained the contract to build the second canal crossing a watershed in Europe, involving many more locks than on the first. It was thus necessary to use locks. A staircase of seven locks was built in Rogny-les-Sept-Écluses. (This was bypassed in 1887 but is preserved as an ancient monument and floodlit at night.)

After Henri IV's assassination, Hugues Cosnier had to give up work in 1611. In 1638, Guillaume Boutheroue and Jacques Guyon applied to resume work, and received letters patent from Louis XIII for this purpose. They created with other nobles the Compagnie des seigneurs du canal de Loyre en Seine and work was completed by 1642.

Reservoirs were dug to supply the approximately 2000 cubic meters of water displaced at each lock. They include the reservoirs of Turfs, Chesnoy, Grand-rû, Tilery, Du Chateau, Cahauderie, Beaurois, the Bourdon reservoir, and the Moutiers reservoir on the Loing. The original source of water was the Étang de la Gazonne.

== Usage ==
By the mid 18th century more than 500 wine barges were in use bringing wines from the Auvergne, Mâcon, Beaujolais, Sancerre, and Languedoc regions. Other cargoes included firewood, timber, coal and iron, faïence from Nevers and fruit from the Auvergne. All hauling was done by men, generally two to a boat.

Shortages of water in the reservoirs and Loire valley often resulted in 2–3 months closure per year.

== Modifications ==
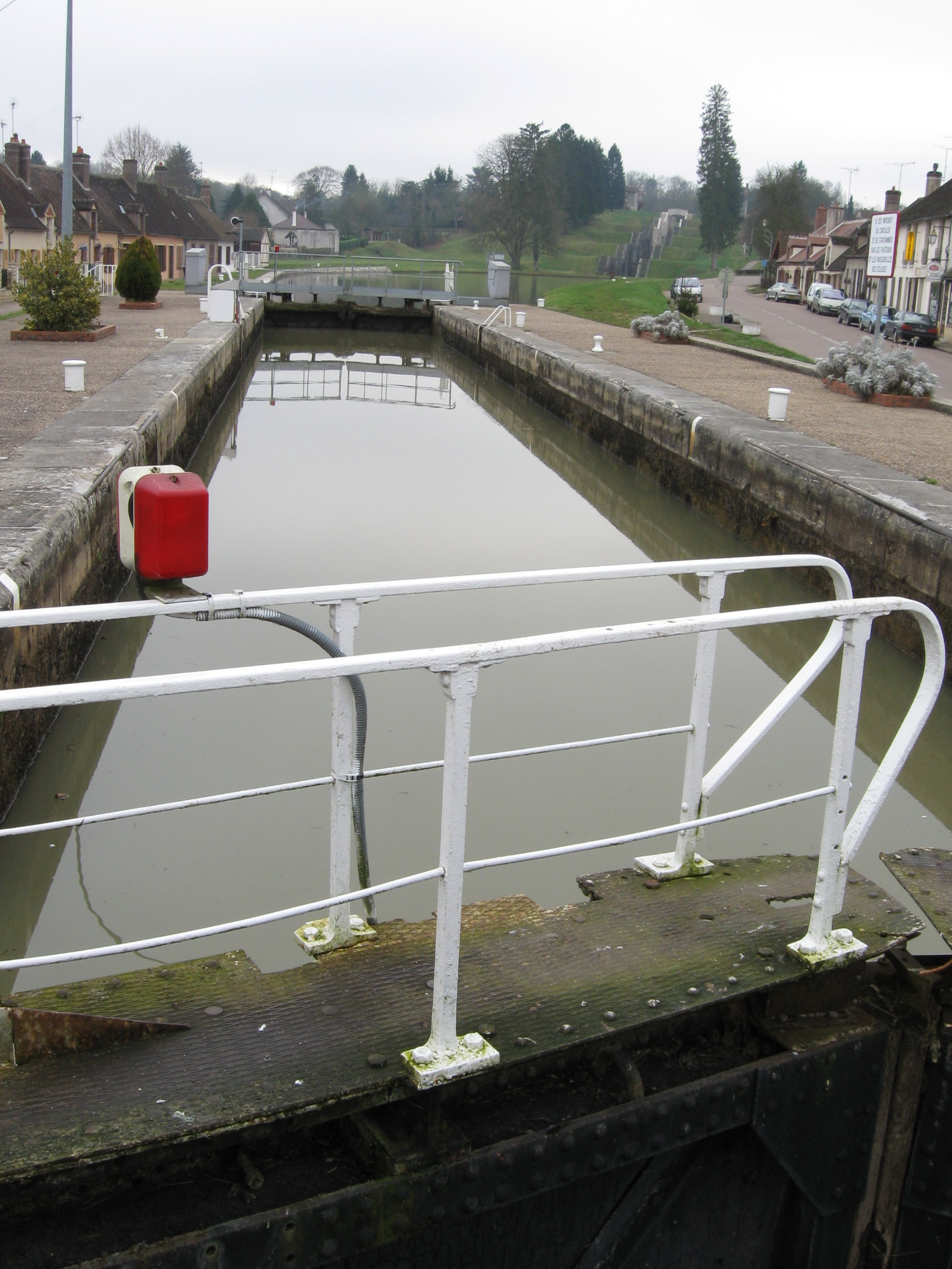
Briare canal in Rogny-les-Sept-Écluses. The old seven lock staircase is in the background

The canal was repurchased by the State in 1860.

In periods of drought the canal's reservoirs were insufficient to keep the canal full of water, therefore in 1894 and 1895 a pumping station was built to pump water into the summit pound.

The Briare aqueduct built over the Loire in Briare between 1890 and 1896 by the engineer Abel Mazoyer is part of the Canal latéral à la Loire, and replaced the old line of that canal, built between 1820 and 1830.

== En route ==
- PK 57 Connection with Canal du Loing and the (disused) Canal d'Orleans at Buges.
- PK 56.7 Aqueduct over the river Solin
- PK 52 Montargis
- PK 40 Montcresson
- PK 35 Montbouy
- PK 29 Châtillon-Coligny (12th-century castle)
- PK 19 Rogny-les-Sept-Écluses
- PK 8 Ouzouër-sur-Trézée
- PK 1 Briare
- PK 0 Baraban entrance lock from the river Loire and junction with the old line of the Canal latéral à la Loire in Briare.

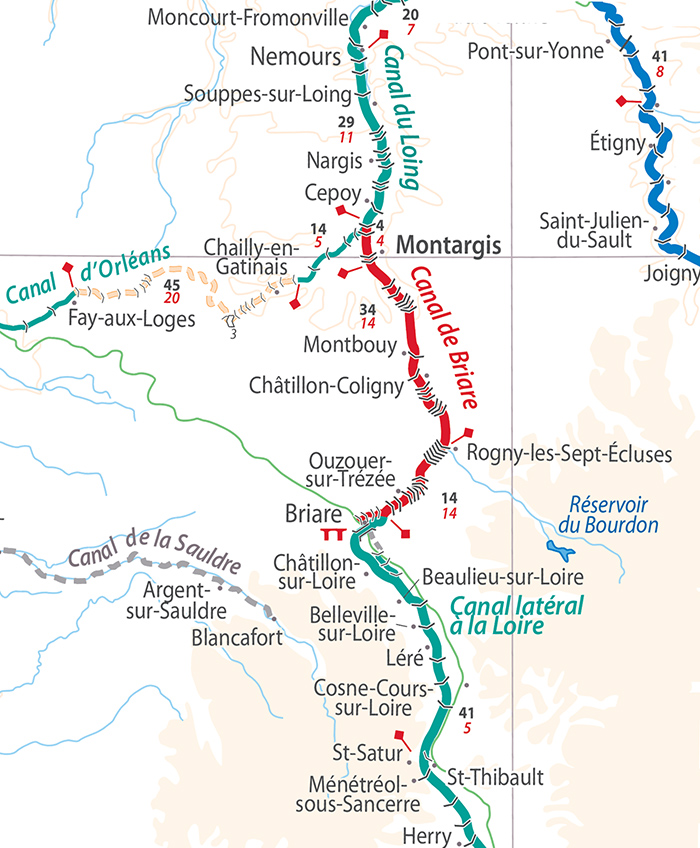
Location of Canal de Briare in relation to the other waterways of central France (from European Waterways Map and Directory, 5th ed., 2014, by David Edwards-May, publ. Transmanche)

== See also ==
- Briare aqueduct
- List of canals in France
