= Grubenmann =

Several members of the Swiss family Grubenmann were famous as carpenters and civil engineers in the 18th century. The sons were innovators in bridge construction.

Ulrich Grubenmann (1668 – 27 June 1736) lived all his life in Gstalden, Appenzell Ausserrhoden where he fathered three sons:

- Jakob Grubenmann (10 January 1694 – 5 October 1758), died in Hombrechtikon, Zürich;
- Johannes Grubenmann (15 June 1707 – 10 June 1771), died in Teufen; and
- Hans Ulrich Grubenmann (23 March 1709 – 22 January 1783), died in Teufen.

"The Bridge at Schaffhausen" by Johann Heinrich Bleuler

The brothers were village carpenters in Teufen. The principal structures are known to be:

- Crossing of the Rhine at Schaffhausen in two spans of 52 m and 59 m respectively, (Hans Ulrich, 1757);
- A single-span of 67 m at Reichenau, (Johannes, 1757);
- Crossing of the Limmat at Wettingen, a 60 m span thought to be the first use of a true arch in a timber bridge, (Hans Ulrich and Johannes, 1778).

Very few of their bridges have survived, those at Schaffhausen and Wettingen being burnt by the French in the war of 1799, but their designs were influential, making use of novel combinations of arches and trusses. The surviving bridges include:

- Rümlangbrücke, Oberglatt, 27.5 m span
- Hundwilertobel, 30 m span
- Kubelbrücke, Herisau, 30 m span

== Bibliography ==
- de Mechel, Chrétien Plans, coupes et élévations des trois points de bois le plus remarquables de la Suisse
- John Soane and the Wooden Bridges of Switzerland: Architecture and the Culture of Technology from Palladio to Grubenmanns, catalogue of an exhibition at Sir John Soane's Museum, ISBN 88-87624-24-0
- Timoshenko, S. P. (1953) History of Strength of Materials, pp182–183, ISBN 0-486-61187-6
- Troyano, L. F. (2003) Bridge Engineering - A Global Perspective, pp158–159, ISBN 0-7277-3215-3
