= John Anthony Derrington =

British civil engineer (1921–2008)

- Born: 24 December 1921; London, England
- Died: 9 February 2008 (aged 86)
- Engineering career
- Discipline: Civil
- Institutions: Institution of Civil Engineers (president), Institution of Structural Engineers (president),[Offshore Engineering Society (president)

John Anthony Derrington (24 December 1921 – 9 February 2008) was a British civil engineer.

== Biography ==
Derrington was born in London. He held a Bachelor of Science degree in engineering and a Diploma of Imperial College.

He was head of the design group at Sir Robert McAlpine and also wrote in the Proceedings of the Institution of Civil Engineers (ICE) regarding multi-story concrete construction.

== Affiliations and honours ==
He was a fellow of the ICE, of the Institution of Structural Engineers (IStructE; 1984–85), and of the Royal Academy of Engineering. He was elected president of the IStructE for the 1979–80 session, of the ICE for the 1984–85 session and of the Offshore Engineering Society for 1987–88. In the 1986 Birthday Honours, he was invested as a Commander of the Order of the British Empire.

== Death ==
Derrington lived in Rottingdean, East Sussex. He died on 9 February 2008 at the age of 86. The ICE held a memorial service for him at Westminster Cathedral on 10 November 2008.

Professional and academic associations
Preceded by James Anthony Gaffney	President of the Institution of Civil Engineers; November 1984 – November 1985	Succeeded by Donald Reeve
