= Donald Reeve =

British civil engineer (1923–1994)

- Born: 1923; Long Buckby, Northamptonshire
- Died: 1994 (aged 70–71)
- Engineering career
- Discipline: Civil
- Institutions: Institution of Civil Engineers (president)

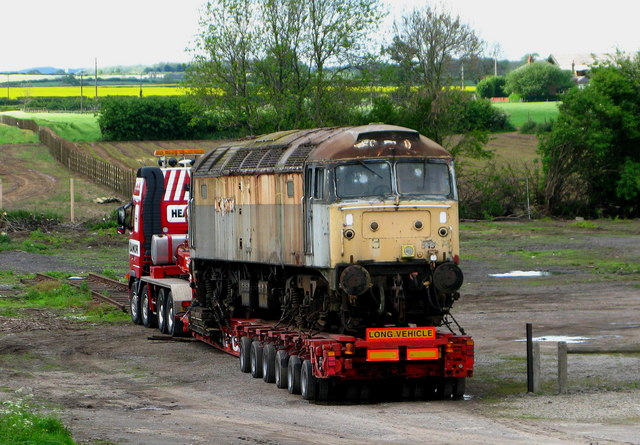
Locomotive 47540 which carried the name originally given by Reeve to another locomotive

Donald Arthur David Reeve CBE (1923–1994) was a British civil engineer.

Reeve was born in 1923 in Long Buckby, Northamptonshire. He became Deputy Chairman and Chief Executive of the Severn Trent Water Authority by 1985 when he was made a Commander of the Order of the British Empire in the Queen's Birthday Honours. Reeve was elected president of the Institution of Civil Engineers for the November 1985 to November 1986 session. On 22 May 1986, he officially named a British Rail Class 47 locomotive (no. 47366) as The Institution of Civil Engineers at Liverpool Lime Street railway station. Locomotive 47366 was scrapped in 1999 but the name had been officially transferred to locomotive number 47969, another British Rail Class 47, on 2 September 1991. This unit (renumbered 47540) was withdrawn from service in 2003 and is currently located at the Wensleydale Railway, a heritage railway line. Reeve himself died in 1994 in the West Midlands.

Professional and academic associations
Preceded by John Anthony Derrington	President of the Institution of Civil Engineers; November 1985 – November 1986	Succeeded by David Gwilym Morris Roberts

== Bibliography ==
- Watson, Garth (1988), The Civils, Thomas Telford Ltd, ISBN 0-7277-0392-7
