= Bill Emery (engineer) =

William Hubert "Bill" Emery (born 28 June 1951) is an engineer who was the chief executive officer of the Office of Rail Regulation from 2005 to 2011. From 1990 to 2005 he was the chief engineer of Ofwat.

After attending Queen Elizabeth Grammar School, Wakefield, Emery studied at Sheffield University, where he subsequently received a BEng degree in civil and structural engineering in 1972 and a PhD degree in public health engineering in 1976. He also obtained an MBA from Bradford University in 1987.
