= Jacob R. Brandt =

American civil engineer

Jacob Rugh Brandt (c. 1836 – 1911), a.k.a. "Blue Jeans" Brandt, was an American civil engineer who built many truss covered bridges in Ohio in the 19th century, born in Greenfield Township, Fairfield County, Ohio.

== Biography ==
The son of Adam and Elizabeth Brandt, Jacob was born in Greenfield Township, Fairfield County, Ohio, an area southeast of Columbus, Ohio. Growing up on the family farm, he is believed to have learned his bridge-building trade from Jonathon Coulson (correct spelling). In addition to constructing bridges, he also was known to build several schools and bridges. One bridge, the Rushville Bridge in Fairfield County, was first constructed by Coulson in 1845 and later reconstructed by Brandt in 1891.

He began his professional career working for Fairfield County commissioners in 1858 as a building planner, providing layouts for churches, schools and small bridges in the area. In 1864 he constructed his first large bridge in Baltimore, Ohio, the McLeery Bridge. His second large one was a king post bridge with arches near Loucks Mill. That bridge was apparently closed to traffic in the 1970s, and amazingly deconstructed and moved to Texas in 1983 (never to be rebuilt). In the late 19th century, Brandt built bridges in several other counties, as well as another in Fairfield County in 1888 known as the Peter Ety Bridge. In 1911 Brandt died.
