= Guillaume Boutheroue =

French engineer

Guillaume Boutheroue was a French engineer who completed the Briare Canal, originated by Hugues Cosnier.

In 1623, he was the poor rate and tax collector at Beaugency.

In 1638, along with his brother-in-law Jacques Guyon, he obtained letters patent from Louis XIII allowing them to complete the Canal de Briare. The canal was completed in 1642.

== See also ==
- Briare Canal
- Hugues Cosnier
