= Joseph Lstiburek =

Canadian forensic engineer

Joseph Lstiburek ASHRAE Fellow B.A.Sc., M.Eng., Ph.D., P.Eng.
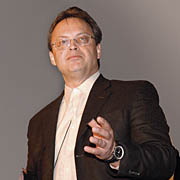
- Born: May 3, 1955 (age 71)
- Citizenship: Canadian
- Education: University of Toronto
- Engineering career
- Discipline: Building science
- Employer: Building Science Corporation

Joseph Lstiburek (/ˈstiːbrɪk/, pronounced STEE-brek) is a forensic engineer, building investigator, building science consultant, author, speaker and widely known expert on building moisture control, indoor air quality, and retro-fit of existing and historic buildings.

Lstiburek is an adjunct professor of Civil Engineering at the University of Toronto; an industry consultant specializing in rain penetration, air and vapor barriers, building durability, construction technology, and microbial contamination — and an advisor on numerous prominent building envelope failures. He consults regularly on building code and industry standards.

Widely known for his "Perfect Wall" concept, Lstiburek identified four key control layers within the building envelope (bulk water, air, thermal and vapor) critical to a building's behavior, long-term performance, and viability. He is a proponent of understanding the concepts that allow older buildings to survive over time in harsh climates — and mimicking those concepts with contemporary construction.

In 2001, The Wall Street Journal called Lstiburek "the dean of North American building science."

== Early career ==
While working towards his bachelor's degree, Lstiburek also worked as a residential construction manager for Product Design Development Corporation. After graduating he became president of Inertia Development Corporation, a company that built and tested twenty low-energy houses.

He went on to work for the Housing and Urban Development Association of Canada (HUDAC) from 1981-1982 where he was involved in the Canada-wide Super Energy Efficient Housing R-2000 program and became the Director of Research.

While studying for his master's degree, he worked at the University of Toronto Centre for Building Science and later served as president of Building Engineering Corporation, a building sciences and components company in the residential construction industry. He also briefly worked in the commercial construction industry as a senior engineer for Trow in Toronto.

After receiving his master's degree, Lstiburek worked in the United States as a consultant with Dames & Moore, a Chicago-based engineering consulting firm specializing in building sciences and construction technology.

In 1990 Lstiburek became a principal at Building Science Corporation.

== Recent career ==
In the 1990s, Lstiburek worked with Pulte Homes to reduce utility costs of their residences by 30% without increasing construction cost or changing their size, shape or look. Lstiburek suggested five changes, and the prototype home subsequently received Nevada's home energy Five Star rating.

In 2005, with Hurricane Katrina's inundation of New Orleans, Lstiburek noted that significantly more older, elevated homes constructed with traditional, water-tolerant methods (masonry and plaster, without cavity insulation) would be able to return to service after the storm — than homes with typical newer construction (gypsum wallboard, insulation-filled cavity)." Lstiburek recommended that future flood-prone construction learn to mimic traditional drainable, dryable, water-tolerant materials.

In 2007, at MIT's Stata Center (subject of lawsuits of the building's architect and contractors), Lstiburek had observed problems during construction, noting that the building envelope's key control layers (rain, air, vapor and thermal) — were in the wrong order, causing the building to soak in its own condensation ("like your T-shirt gets sopping under a leather jacket"), causing erosion of building materials and mold, as well as causing the building to "smell like dirty socks." Lstiburek noted that "basic errors like these occur in up to 20% of all new buildings going up" from simple buildings to "soaring landmarks."

Lstiburek has been involved in the development of standards and industry resources by U.S. government agencies. He is the principal investigator for the Building Science Consortium, an industry group in the U.S. Department of Energy (DoE)'s Building America Program that encourages the development of energy efficient innovations in the homebuilding industry. He participated in a 40-city seminar tour of the United States for the EPA and BOMA. Lstiburek authored the DoE handbook on moisture control and was a special contributor to the EPA's "Building Air Quality: A Guide for Building Owners and Facility Managers."

Lstiburek is a regular speaker and presenter at industry events. He appeared on the PBS Nova program entitled "Can Buildings Make You Sick?" featuring his work on the Registry Building in Boston, MA. Lstiburek writes regularly for industry publications and has published a number of books.

In 2008, Lstiburek contributed to an article written for ASHRAE raising doubts about efficiency claims of LEED certified commercial buildings — a points-based, third-party verified industry measurement standard for building sustainability. Lstiburek, along with fellow building scientists, challenged the statistics on LEED buildings as well as comparisons used in a 2007 (and updated 2008) New Buildings Institute report. Lstiburek urged the industry to emphasize real-world, actual energy savings rather than "chasing points."

== Recognition ==
In 2009, Lstiburek was nominated for the Hanley Award for contributions to the advancement of sustainable housing in the United States.

In 2007, the Energy & Environmental Building Association (EEBA) awarded Lstiburek a Legacy Award for the development of building performance and the science of new home construction.

In 2004, Lstiburek became an ASHRAE Fellow.

In 2000/2001 Lstiburek received an Anthony A. Woods Award, given by the Ontario Building Envelope Council (OBEC) for contributions to the design, construction and performance of the building envelope.

In 1994, the Energy & Environmental Building Association (EEBA) awarded Lstiburek a design award for his joint design effort with architect and business partner Betsy Pettit for an affordable Dallas development of heavy-insulated three-bedroom homes, maximizing solar gain, natural light and shade as well as providing appropriate ventilation.

In 1992, the Energy & Environmental Building Association (EEBA) awarded Lstiburek an Award for Technical Merit.

== Publications ==
- The ASHRAE Guide for Buildings in Hot & Humid Climates. Lew Harriman III and Joseph Lstiburek. 2009. ASHRAE. ISBN 978-1-933742-43-4
- Builder's Guide to Structural Insulated Panels (SIPs) for all Climates. Joseph Lstiburek. 2008. Building Science Press. ISBN 978-0-9755127-8-4
- Water Management Guide. Joseph W. Lstiburek. January 2006. Building Science Press. ISBN 0-9755127-5-7
- Builder's Guide to Hot-Humid Climates. Joseph Lstiburek. 2005. Building Science Press. ISBN 0-9755127-3-0
- Builder's Guide to Mixed-Humid Climates. Joseph Lstiburek. January 1, 2005. Delmar Cengage Learning. ISBN 0-9755127-2-2
- Builder's Guide to Hot-Dry & Mixed-Dry Climates. Joseph Lstiburek. 2004. Building Science Press. ISBN 0-9755127-0-6
- Builder's Guide to Cold Climates. Joseph Lstiburek. 2004. Building Science Press. ISBN 0-9755127-1-4
- Builder's Guide to Cold Climates. Joseph Lstiburek. 2022. Building Science Press. ISBN 9780975512715
- Builder's Guide to Mixed Climates: Details for Design and Construction Joseph W. Lstiburek. February 2001. Taunton Press. ISBN 1-56158-388-X
- Read This Before You Move In: Healthy and Affordable Housing: Practical Recommendations for Building, Renovating and Maintaining Housing 2001. Asthma Regional Coordinating Council of New England. PDF Version
- Builder's Guide to Cold Climates: Details for Design and Construction. Joseph Lstiburek. February 3, 2000 Taunton Press. ISBN 1-56158-374-X
- Spray polyurethane foam in external envelopes of buildings. Mark Bomberg and Joseph W. Lstiburek. 1998. CRC Press. ISBN 1-56676-707-5
- Moisture Control Handbook: Principles and Practices for Residential and Small Commercial Buildings. Joseph Lstiburek and John Carmody. January 1, 1996. Wiley. ISBN 0-471-31863-9
- Builder's Field Guide. Joseph W. Lstiburek, John Manuel, Arnie Katz. 1994. NC Alternate Energy Corporation.
- Moisture Control for New Residential Buildings. Joseph Lstiburek and John Carmody. Chapter 17 in Moisture Control in Buildings Heinz R. Trechsel, ed. 1994. American Society for Testing and Materials. ISBN 0-8031-2051-6
- A new approach to affordable low energy house construction. Joseph Lstiburek. 1994. Atlanta Department of Housing. ISBN 0-88654-074-7
- Building Air Quality: A Guide for Building Owners and Facility Managers (SuDoc EP 4.8:Ai 7/7). U.S. Environmental Protection Agency (Technical advisors: Lstiburek, Turner, Brennan, and Light). 1991. U.S. Environmental Protection Agency, Office of Air and Radiation, Office of Atmospheric and Indoor Air Programs, Indoor Air Division U.S. Dept. of Health and Human Services, Public Health Service, Centers for Disease Control, National Institute for Occupational Safety and Health.
- The Airtight House: using the airtight drywall approach: a construction manual. James K. Lischkoff, Joseph Lstiburek. 1991. Iowa State University Research Foundation.

== Articles ==
In addition to the recent feature articles listed below, Lstiburek has been a regular columnist for the Building Sciences column of the ASHRAE Journal and has authored a number of white papers, guides, and research reports.

- Mold Explosion: Why Now? Fine Homebuilding December 2006/Jan 2007
- The Future of Framing is Here: Smarter strategies can save money, speed construction, improve energy efficiency, and cut down on job-site waste Fine Homebuilding October/November 2005
- Lessons from Florida's Hurricanes: Why Stucco Walls Got Wet. Jose Lstiburek. Journal of Light Construction. July 2005
- Built Wrong from the Start: Top 10 blunders that rot your house, waste your money, and make you sick. Fine Homebuilding April/May 2004
- Water-Managed Wall Systems. Journal of Light Construction March 2003
- Residential Ventilation and Latent Loads. Joseph Lstiburek. ASHRAE Journal April 2002, pages 18–21
- Moisture, Building Enclosures, and Mold: How water gets into a structure, why it doesn't leave, and how these architectural flaws become HVAC headaches. HPAC Engineering December 2001/January 2002
