= Gwilym Morris Roberts =

British civil engineer (1925–2020)

Gwilym Roberts
- Born: 1925; Harlech, Wales
- Died: July 31, 2020
- Engineering career
- Discipline: Civil
- Institutions: Institution of Civil Engineers (president)

David Gwilym Morris Roberts (24 July 1925 - 31 July 2020) was a British civil engineer, cited as "one of the most influential civil engineers of the 20th century". Born in North Wales, he grew up in Merseyside before attending Cambridge University. Following graduation, he served with the Royal Naval Volunteer Reserve, including several cruises on board HMS Sheffield. After demobilisation he served part-time with the naval reserves reaching the rank of lieutenant commander. In civilian life Roberts was employed by water engineering consultant John Taylor & Sons and remained with them and their successor bodies for the rest of his career. He became founder chairman of the successor Acer Consultants in 1987, holding the post for five years, during which the group's turnover quadrupled and employee numbers trebled.

Roberts worked extensively in the Middle East, largely upon wastewater and water-treatment schemes. He worked with many engineering organisations and became president of the Institution of Civil Engineers in 1986. Roberts has written a number of academic papers on diverse subjects and has received awards for many of them. In retirement he was active in a number of engineering and other organisations.

== Early life and military service ==
Roberts was born in Harlech, Wales in July 1925. His parents, who were both fluent in Welsh, moved to Merseyside where Roberts attended Merchant Taylors' School, Crosby. Having been awarded a State Bursary in 1943 Roberts studied engineering at Sidney Sussex College, Cambridge, where he remained until 1945.

Roberts then entered the engineering branch of the Royal Naval Volunteer Reserve (RNVR), the reserve officer force of the Royal Navy, and undertook his initial training at Devonport. He served on the cruiser HMS Sheffield whilst she was flagship of the America and West Indies Station, and made several cruises aboard her showing the flag in South America and the Caribbean, during which time he was transferred to the main Royal Navy with the rank of temporary sub-lieutenant(E). He returned to the RNVR on 7 December 1948 with his rank confirmed as permanent, and seniority backdated to 24 July, and was promoted to lieutenant on 17 August of the next year with seniority again backdated to 24 July. He was subsequently promoted to the rank of lieutenant commander on 25 September 1957 (with seniority again of 24 July) and retired in that rank on 23 April 1963, by which time the RNVR had become the Royal Naval Reserve.

== Engineering career ==
On leaving HMS Sheffield Roberts entered civilian employment as an Assistant Resident Engineer with John Taylor & Sons, an engineering consultancy which specialised in water and wastewater engineering. His first assignment was to a drainage project in Bootle, where he received a wage of £5 per week, before moving to the firm's London offices in 1949. Roberts was sent to Kuwait in 1952 to design that country's first water-distribution system, an assignment that began a lifelong association with the Middle East. He was appointed a partner in the firm in 1956 and subsequently designed water-supply projects in Bahrain, Oman and Saudi Arabia, and sewerage projects in Abu Dhabi, Dubai, Egypt, Qatar, Saudi Arabia, Thailand and Iraq – including Baghdad's first sewage-treatment scheme. During this time Roberts also worked in the UK, at John Taylor & Sons' Liverpool and Plymouth offices, working on various water and wastewater projects including the design of marine outfall sewer pipes.

In 1968 Roberts was elected president of the Institution of Public Health Engineers and in 1974 represented the institution on the code-drafting sub-committee of the British Standards for foundations of machinery. Continuing his work with sewerage design at John Taylor & Sons he was part of the Anglo-American team that was awarded the Cairo Wastewater Project in 1978, one of the largest public-health engineering projects ever constructed. Roberts became John Taylor's senior partner in 1984 and was elected president of the Institution of Civil Engineers for the 1986–87 session. He was also a member of the Natural Environment Research Council from August 1987 to July 1993 and was made a Commander of the Order of the British Empire in 1987. Roberts became co-chairman, and later chairman, of Acer Consultants, which was formed in 1987 following the merger of John Taylor & Sons with Freeman Fox & Partners. He retired as chairman in 1992, by which time he had overseen a quadrupling of the group's turnover and a trebling of staff numbers. He was president of the Smeatonian Society of Civil Engineers in 2009, having been elected to membership of the society in 1987.

During his career Roberts also served as chairman of the British Geological Survey, of the Football Stadia Advisory Design Council, the Second Severn Crossing Technical Adjudication Panel and as visiting professor at Loughborough University. He was also the Royal Academy of Engineering's honorary secretary for civil engineering and a Fellow of the Institution of Mechanical Engineers, an Honorary Fellow of the Chartered Institution of Water and Environmental Management and was named one of Britain's four major international engineers of the 20th century by The Sunday Times Magazine. He was also a frequent academic author with over 19 articles in recognised journals, sometimes in collaboration with co-authors. These covered topics including marine engineering, sewage treatment, highways and engineering history, and were recognised by the award of the Institution of Civil Engineers' Stephenson Medal & Halcrow Premium, and the Institution of Public Health Engineers' gold and silver medals. On 21 July 2015, at the age of 89, he delivered the Smeaton Lecture at the Institution of Civil Engineers.

== Personal life ==
Roberts married Rosemary Giles in 1960 and they had two children together. Rosemary died in 1973 and Roberts subsequently married Wendy Moore in 1978. He remained involved with his alma mater, becoming president of the Merchant Taylors' School Old Boys' Association in 1998 and an honorary fellow of Sidney Sussex College in 1994. He has made charitable donations to both bodies. He has also donated to the Royal Academy of Engineering Development Appeal. Roberts was a director of the Newcomen Society for the Study of History of Engineering and Technology, and was a Liveryman of the Worshipful Companies of Constructors, Engineers and Water Conservators and was chairman of his parish council. He lived in Newick in East Sussex.

He died on 31 July 2020 at the age of 95.

== Publications ==
In retirement he continued with the writing of articles and books, most of which were on non-technical aspects of engineering topics. The books included

- Engineering Hitler's Downfall - the Brains that enabled Victory (Technical innovations which contributed to the Allied victory) Whittles (2018) ISBN 978-1849953863
- Chelsea to Cairo: Taylor-made Water Through Eleven Reigns and in Six Continents (a history of water engineering consultancy John Taylor & Sons) Thomas Telford (2006) ISBN 978-0727734112
- Built by Oil (post-war engineering projects in the Middle East) Ithaca Press (1995) (with David Fowler) ISBN 978-0863721892
- From Kendal’s Coffee House to Great George Street, (a history of the headquarters buildings of the ICE) Thomas Telford (1995) ISBN 978-0727720221

while papers included the following (published by Thomas Telford Ltd for ICE)

- St Pancras Station - Victorian Cathedral of the Railways
- Middle East Archaeology
- Middle East Postwar Engineering Projects
- How a Diver saved Winchester Cathedral
- F E Cooper (1841-1933): the Supreme Resident Engineer
- Bridging in the Second World War: an Imperative to Victory (with DLG Begbie)

and

- Sir John Anderson (1814-86) - the Unknown Engineer who made the British Empire possible (Newcomen Society)

Professional and academic associations
Preceded by Donald Reeve	President of the Institution of Civil Engineers; November 1986 – November 1987	Succeeded by William Francis
