= T. Leslie Youd =

American geotechnical and earthquake engineer

- Education: Brigham Young University; Iowa State University
- Engineering career
- Discipline: Geotechnical engineering earthquake engineering
- Institutions: Brigham Young University

T. Leslie Youd is an American geotechnical engineer and earthquake engineer, specializing in soil liquefaction and ground failure. He currently lives in Orem, Utah.

== Education ==
Youd received his BES in civil engineering from Brigham Young University in 1964. He then attended Iowa State University where he received his PhD in civil engineering in 1967. He performed post doctoral study in soil mechanics and engineering seismology from 1975 to 1976 at Imperial College of Science and Technology in London.

== Research ==
Youd's research has been primarily concerned with the phenomenon of soil liquefaction, and the associated lateral spreading which can occur. Youd has published over 140 research papers. Youd's best-known papers are on the prediction of the magnitude of lateral spreading.

== Awards and honors ==
Youd was elected to the National Academy of Engineering in 2005.

Youd was made an honorary member of the American Society of Civil Engineers in 2006, an honor bestowed upon fewer than 0.2% of its membership. He received the Distinguished Alumni Award in 2011 at Iowa State University.

Youd was elected to the Utah Academy of Engineering and Science in 2021.

== Patents ==
Youd earned patent #4,840,230 for a system to retrievably install instruments into a borehole.
