= John Shepherd-Barron =

British inventor

John Shepherd-Barron OBE
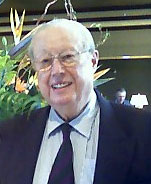
- John Shepherd-Barron in 2007
- Born: John Adrian Shepherd-Barron; 23 June 1925; Shillong, Assam Province, British India (present-day Meghalaya, India)
- Died: 15 May 2010 (aged 84); Inverness, Scotland, United Kingdom
- Citizenship: British
- Occupation: Inventor
- Known for: Inventing the cash machine (ATM)
- Spouse: Caroline Murray (m. 1953)
- Children: 3

John Adrian Shepherd-Barron OBE (23 June 1925 – 15 May 2010) was an India-born British inventor, who led the team that installed the first cash machine, sometimes referred to as the automated teller machine or ATM.

== Early life ==
John Adrian Shepherd-Barron was born on 23 June 1925 in Shillong (now Meghalaya), India, to British parents. His Scottish father, Wilfred Shepherd-Barron, was chief engineer of the Chittagong Port Commissioners in North Bengal, which was then part of the British Empire, then later Chief Engineer of the Port of London Authority, before becoming president of the Institution of Civil Engineers, whilst his mother Dorothy, was an Olympic tennis player and Wimbledon ladies doubles champion. He was educated at Stowe School, the University of Edinburgh and Trinity College, Cambridge (from where he dropped out before successfully finishing the first year in Economics). During World War II, he was commissioned into the airborne forces, serving with the 159th Parachute Light Regiment.

== Career ==
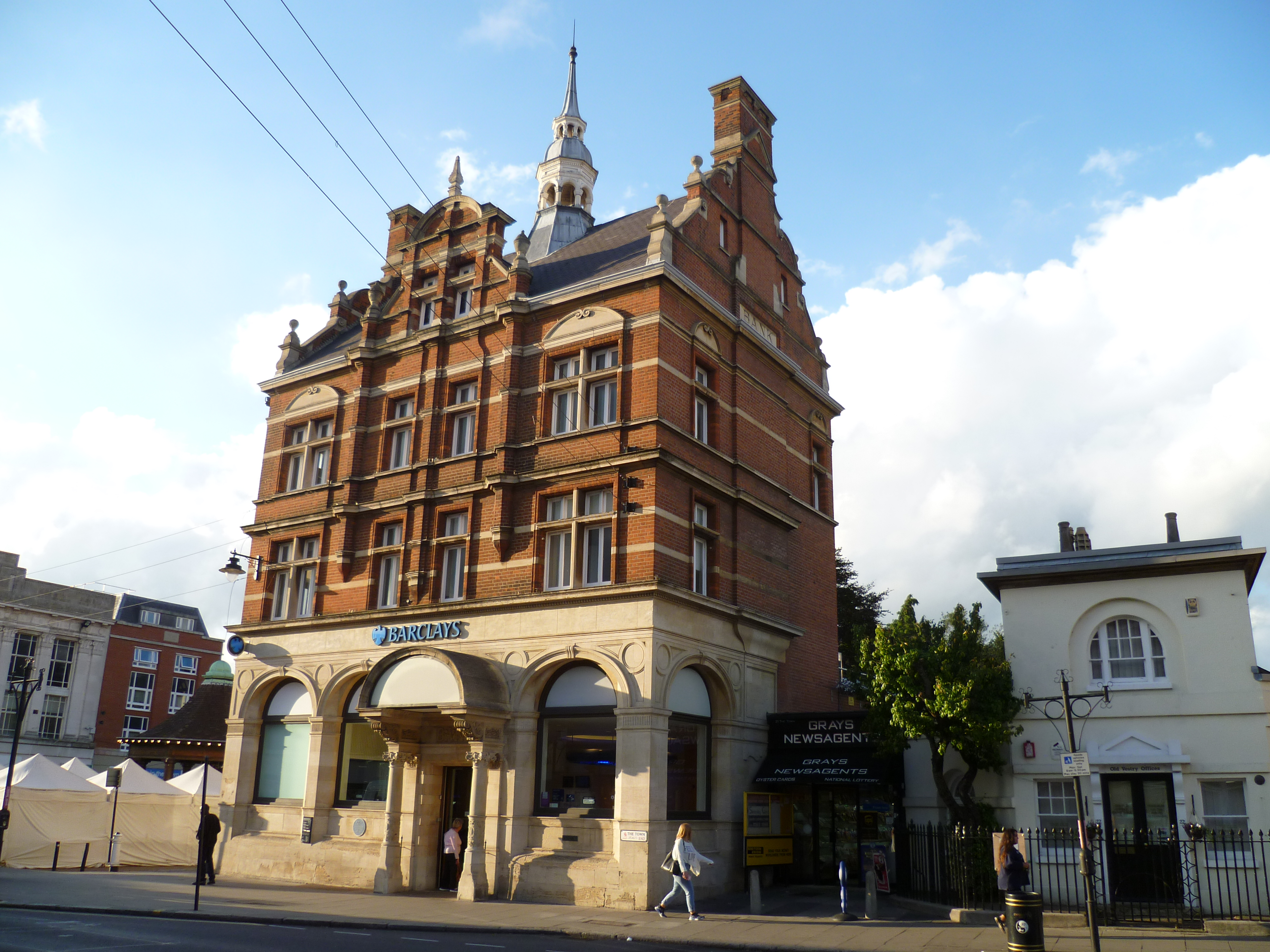
The Enfield branch of Barclays Bank, site of the first cash machine

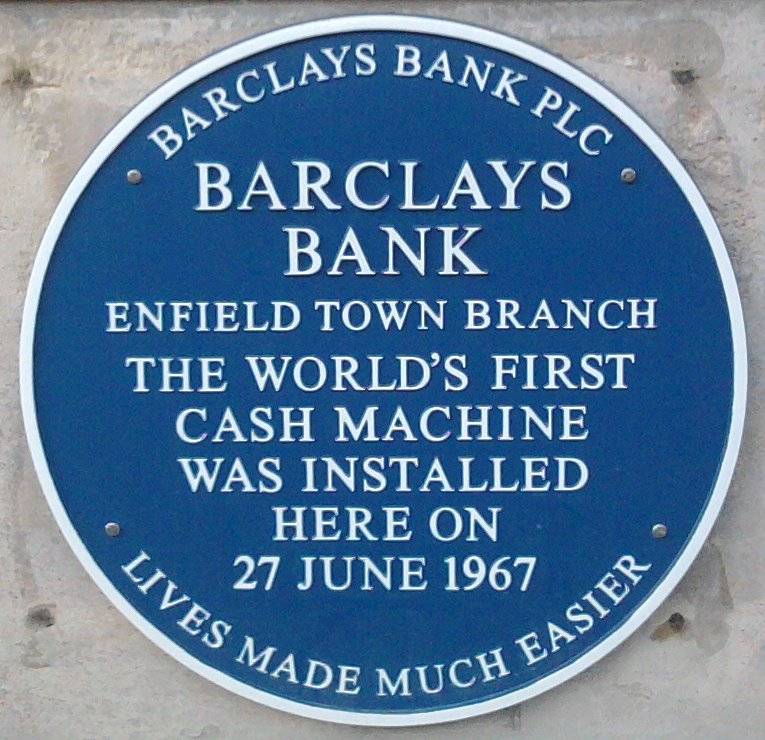
Blue plaque on the Enfield Barclays commemorating the world's first cash machine

Shepherd-Barron joined De La Rue in the 1950s as a management trainee and grew to become Managing Director of De La Rue Instruments (with a mandate to run down the company). He conceived the idea for a self-service machine dispensing cash whilst lying in the bath. He was considering the problem of bank opening hours, having turned up at a bank after closing time one day and found himself unable to withdraw money. Shepherd-Barron has stated that he was inspired by chocolate vending machines: "It struck me there must be a way I could get my own money, anywhere in the world or the UK. I hit upon the idea of a chocolate bar dispenser, but replacing chocolate with cash."

The first De La Rue Automatic Cash System (DACS) machine, called Barclaycash, was installed outside the Enfield branch of Barclays Bank in northern Greater London in June 1967. The first person to withdraw cash was actor Reg Varney, a celebrity resident of Enfield known for his part in a number of popular television series. An early deployment of this device outside of the UK took place in Zürich in November 1967. It was called a Geldautomat.

The DACS machines used cheque-like tokens (which were guillotined to the size of a normal cheque inside the machine) which had been impregnated with a radioactive compound of carbon-14. The radioactive signal was detected by the machine and matched against the personal identification number (PIN) entered on a keypad. The short-range beta emission from carbon-14 could be easily detected, and he determined that the radiation hazard was acceptable as "you would have to eat 136,000 such cheques for it to have any effect on you". Initially, a PIN length of six digits was proposed; Shepherd-Barron tested this system on his wife, Caroline, but found that the longest string of numbers that she could remember was four. As a result, four-digit PINs were chosen and as ATMs expanded across the globe, this became the world standard. Withdrawals from the first Barclaycash machines were limited to a maximum of £10, "quite enough for a wild weekend" according to Shepherd-Barron.

Shepherd-Barron received the OBE in the 2005 New Year's Honours list for services to banking as "inventor of the automatic cash dispenser".

Various rival cash dispenser systems quickly began to emerge. Another Scottish inventor, James Goodfellow, who was working at Smiths Industries, was commissioned by Chubb Locks to work on a new cash machine. Together with Anthony Davies, he developed a new system whereby the user's PIN could be stored on a reusable bank card, rather than on single-use cheques. The system was patented as GB1197183 and US3905461 and was cited by subsequent patents as "prior art device". Goodfellow's PIN system resembled modern ATMs more than Shepherd-Barron's machine. However, Shepherd-Barron's machine was the first to be installed, if only for a few days.

== Personal life ==
In 1953, he married Caroline Murray, the daughter of Sir Kenneth Murray, one-time chairman of the Royal Bank of Scotland. They had three sons. One, Nicholas Shepherd-Barron FRS, is professor of algebraic geometry at the King's College London.

=== Death ===
John Adrian Shepherd-Barron died on 15 May 2010 after a brief illness at the age of 84 in Raigmore Hospital, Inverness, Scotland. He was survived by his wife and their three sons, and extended family.
