= James Anthony Gaffney =

British civil engineer (1928–2016)

James Gaffney
- Born: James Anthony Gaffney; 1928
- Died: 2 March 2016 (aged 87–88)
- Engineering career
- Discipline: Civil
- Institutions: Chartered Institution of Highways and Transportation (President 1978-79); Institution of Civil Engineers (President 1983-84); Fellow of the Royal Academy of Engineering
- Projects: Construction of the M62

James Anthony "Tony" Gaffney (1928–2016) was a British civil engineer.

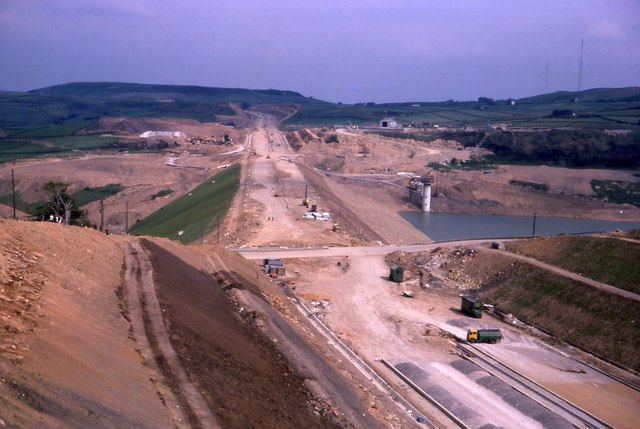
Construction of the M62 next to the newly built Scammonden Reservoir

Gaffney was born in the Rhymney Valley, South Wales in 1928 and holds BSc and DSc degrees.

He was the County Engineer for the West Riding of Yorkshire at the time of the construction of Scammonden Reservoir and M62 in the late 1960s. He was elected president of the Chartered Institution of Highways and Transportation for the 1978-79 session and elected president of the Institution of Civil Engineers for the 1983-84 session.

As part of the 1984 Queen's Birthday Honours Gaffney was, on 16 June, appointed a Commander of the Order of the British Empire, in the civil division. At one point he was Director of Engineering Services at the West Yorkshire Metropolitan County Council.

He died on 2 March 2016 at the age of 87.

Professional and academic associations
Preceded by John Vernon Bartlett	President of the Institution of Civil Engineers; November 1983 – November 1984	Succeeded by John Anthony Derrington
