= Henry Cronin =

British civil engineer and army officer

Henry Francis Cronin
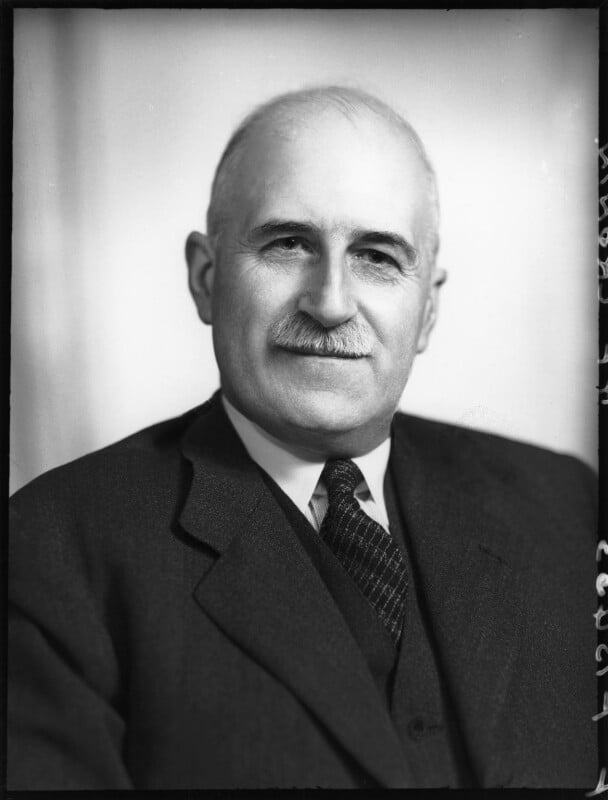
- Cronin in 1952
- Born: 1894; Ketton, Rutland
- Died: 11 January 1977 (aged 82–83)
- Engineering career
- Discipline: Civil
- Institutions: Institution of Civil Engineers (president),

Henry Francis Cronin CBE, MC, BSc (Eng) (1894 – 11 January 1977) was a British civil engineer and army officer. He served in the Royal Inniskilling Fusiliers and the Royal Engineers during the First World War and was awarded the Military Cross for constructing defensive works and taking part in assaults under heavy fire. Cronin was appointed chief engineer of London's Metropolitan Water Board in 1939 and held that position until 1959. During the London Blitz he worked hard to maintain water supplies for fire fighting.

== Early life and First World War ==
Henry Francis Cronin was born in Ketton, Rutland in 1894. He studied engineering and was awarded a Bachelor of Science degree. Cronin served as a commissioned officer in the British Army during World War I. He was commissioned in September 1914 and was appointed to the rank of Temporary Lieutenant in the Royal Inniskilling Fusiliers. He transferred in the same rank to the Royal Engineers on 19 May 1917.

Whilst serving with the Royal Engineers, Cronin was awarded the Military Cross in 1918 for gallantry in battle at an unspecified location. He was ordered to follow behind an attacking infantry unit with a section of sappers and to assist with the construction of strongpoints to make the position more defendable. Cronin reached the front with his men and immediately began the construction of field defences despite being under extremely heavy enemy fire from a flank. This fire eventually became so heavy that he halted works and assisted the infantry with the mopping up of enemy resistance. In the course of this Cronin assaulted enemy positions and captured several prisoners of war. He then resumed construction of the defensive works. Cronin's actions were said, in his medal citation, to have "very greatly helped" the success of the attack.

== Second World War ==
Cronin was appointed Chief Engineer of the Metropolitan Water Board in 1939 and remained in that post throughout the war. During the period of the London Blitz he worked hard to maintain water supplies, essential for fire fighting and vulnerable to bomb damage. During the bombings breaks averaged one per day per 100 miles of water pipe, rising to one break per day per mile in some areas of London.

Cronin resumed his association with the military on 29 October 1943 when he was appointed lieutenant colonel of the Engineer and Railway Staff Corps, an unpaid Territorial Army unit which provided technical expertise to the British Army. By this stage he was a professional member of both the Institution of Civil Engineers and the Institution of Mechanical Engineers. In 1944, he was appointed a Commander of the Order of the British Empire for services to Civil Defence.

== Post-war ==
In 1942 and 1945 Cronin served as president of the Institution of Water Engineers. He was a member of the American Water Works Association from 1944 and in 1956 was awarded honorary membership in recognition for his devotion to duty during the London Blitz. Cronin wrote a report on the flooding in the Lea Valley following the Winter of 1946–47 in the United Kingdom.

Cronin was promoted to colonel in the Engineer and Railway Staff Corps on 6 September 1950. Cronin retired from the corps on 25 February 1957, receiving permission to retain the use of his rank. Cronin was elected president of the Institution of Civil Engineers in May 1952 for the November 1952 to November 1953 session. Cronin addressed the American Society of Civil Engineers in 1953 and in 1954 was appointed a fellow of Imperial College London. Cronin retired from the Metropolitan Water Board in 1959 and died in 1977.

== Bibliography ==
- Watson, Garth (1988), The Civils, Thomas Telford Ltd, ISBN 978-0-7277-0392-7

Professional and academic associations
Preceded by Allan Quartermaine	President of the Institution of Civil Engineers; November 1952 – November 1953	Succeeded by Wilfred Shepherd-Barron
