= Edward Judge =

Edward Thomas Judge (c.1909–1992) was an English engineer and industrialist. For most of his career he worked at steel and bridge company Dorman Long, and later he was President of the British Iron and Steel Federation.

Judge was born in Worcester, England and educated at Royal Grammar School Worcester and St John's College, Cambridge, where he studied engineering.

He entered the manufacturing company Dorman Long, becoming involved in the design and construction of the Sydney Harbour Bridge and the Tyne Bridge. He was responsible for setting up the Lackenby Universal Beam Mill, part of the extensive Teesside Steelworks which became the chief supplier of steel in the UK. He became Chief Engineer of Dorman Long (Steel), and the company's joint managing director.

He became President of the British Iron and Steel Federation in 1965.

He wrote the book Dorman Long: a concise history, which was published in 1992.
