= Johannes Grubenmann =

Swiss engineer (1707–1771)

Johannes Grubenmann (15 June 1707 – 10 June 1771) was a member of the Swiss Grubenmann family who were known as carpenters and civil engineers in the eighteenth century. He specialized in constructing church towers, turret clocks and bridges.
