= John Duncan Watson =

British civil engineer

- Engineering career
- Discipline: Civil
- Institutions: Institution of Civil Engineers (president)

John Duncan Watson (7 March 1860 – 1946) was a British civil engineer.

Watson was born in Dundee, Scotland on 7 March 1860. He specialised in sanitation and was regarded as a pioneer in the development of sewage treatment. Watson was engineer to the Birmingham and District Drainage Board and also General Manager to the Birmingham, Tame and Rea District Drainage Board. At Birmingham he was responsible for the construction of the first large-scale percolating filter plant, a complete departure from the traditional land treatment in use in the city and elsewhere. Other changes that he introduced, based on his work in Birmingham, were the separation of sludge digestion, the extraction of methane from sewage for use in power generation and the introduction of flocculation prior to the percolating filter. He drew up plans for sanitation works in the district of Aberdeen which included a pumping station at Denmill, reservoir at the Hill of Ord and water supply to the district of Culter. These plans are now held by the National Archives of Scotland.

Watson became General Manager of Birmingham Agricultural College by 1920 where he undertook investigations into tuberculosis in cattle. By 1920 he was also a member of the Institution of Civil Engineers (ICE) and a fellow of the Royal Sanitary Institute. Watson was elected president of the ICE for the November 1935 to November 1936 session. In his retirement he joined his son, David Mowat Watson, who was also a member of the ICE, in his private engineering consultancy practice. Watson died in Birmingham in 1946. His son, David Watson followed in his footsteps in November 1954 by also becoming president of the ICE.

Professional and academic associations
Preceded by Richard Redmayne	President of the Institution of Civil Engineers; November 1935 – November 1936	Succeeded by Alexander Gibb
