= List of preserved British Rail Class 47 locomotives =

A significant number of British Rail Class 47 locomotives have been preserved on heritage railways, the current total standing at 32 as of July 2024. Five locomotives (47 270, 47 580, 47 712, 47 773 and 47 828) are mainline registered and as such may operate on Network Rail. Locomotives that do not currently carry their names are shown with the name in brackets.

== Preserved examples ==
Numbers carried (Current number in bold)					Name	Livery	Location	Owner
**1500**	47 401	-	-	-	North Eastern	BR Blue	Midland Railway - Butterley	The 47401 Project
**D1501**	47 402	-	-	-	(Gateshead)	BR Green	Chinnor and Princes Risborough Railway	Privately Owned
**D1516**	47 417	-	-	-	-	BR Green	Midland Railway - Butterley	The 47401 Project
**D1524**	47 004	-	-	-	(Old Oak Common)	BR Green	Embsay & Bolton Abbey Steam Railway	Newton Heath Diesel Traction Group
D1566	**47 449**	-	-	-	(Orion)	BR Blue	Llangollen Railway	Llangollen Diesel Group
D1606	47 029	**47 635**	-	-	Jimmy Milne	BR Blue Large Logo	Epping Ongar Railway	Privately Owned
D1643	47 059	47 631	**47 765**	-	(Ressaldar)	BR Scotrail Blue Stripe	East Lancashire Railway	Privately owned
D1654	47 070	47 620	47 835	**47 799**	(Prince Henry)	Royal Train Maroon	Eden Valley Railway	Privately Owned
D1656	47 072	47 609	47 834	**47 798**	Prince William	Royal Train Maroon	National Railway Museum	National Railway Museum
D1661	**47 077**	47 613	47 840	-	NORTH STAR	BR Blue	North Yorkshire Moors Railway	Diesel & Electric Preservation Group
D1662	**47 484**	-	-	-	(Isambard Kingdom Brunel)	GWR Green	Wishaw	Pioneer Diesel Group
1693	**47 105**	-	-	-	-	BR Blue	Gloucestershire Warwickshire Railway	Brush Type 4 Fund
**1705**	47 117	-	-	-	Sparrowhawk	BR Blue	Great Central Railway	Type 1 Locomotive Company
**D1755**	47 161	47 541	**47 773**	-	(The Queen Mother)	BR Green	Tyseley Locomotive Works	Vintage Trains
D1762	47 167	**47 580**	47 732	-	County of Essex	BR Blue with Union Jack (Stratford grey roof)	Mid Norfolk Railway	Mid Norfolk Railway
D1778	47 183	**47 579**	47 793	-	James Nightall GC	BR Blue Large Logo	The Watercress Line	Privately Owned.
D1787	**47 306**	-	-	-	(The Sapper)	Railfreight Distribution European	Bodmin & Wenford Railway	Bodmin & Wenford Main Line Diesel Group
**D1842**	47 192	-	-	-	Basil	BR Green	Crewe Heritage Centre	Crewe Heritage Trust Limited
D1855	47 205	47 395	**47 205**	-	-	Railfreight Distribution triple grey	Northampton & Lamport Railway	Privately Owned
D1886	**47 367**	-	-	-	(Kenny Cockbird)	BR Blue	Chinnor and Princes Risborough Railway	Privately Owned
D1895	**47 376**	-	-	-	Freightliner 1995	Freightliner Grey	Gloucestershire Warwickshire Railway	Brush Type 4 Fund
D1909	47 232	47 665	47 820	**47 785**	(Fiona Castle)	EWS	Wensleydale Railway	Harry Needle
D1921	47 244	**47 640**	-	-	University of Strathclyde	BR Blue Large Logo	Battlefield Railway	Privately Owned
**D1933**	47 255	47 596	-	-	Aldeburgh Festival	BR Green	Mid-Norfolk Railway	Mid-Norfolk Railway
D1945	47 502	**47 715**	-	-	(Haymarket)	Virgin Trains	Chinnor and Princes Risborough Railway	Rail Engineering Solutions
D1946	47 503	**47 771**	-	-	(Heaton Traincare Depot)	Rail Express Systems	Arlington Eastleigh Works	Class 47 Preservation Project
D1948	47 505	**47 712**	-	-	Lady Diana Spencer	BR Scotrail Blue Stripe	Crewe Diesel TMD	Crewe Diesel Preservation Group
D1955	47 511	**47 714**	-	-		Rail Express Systems	Wensleydale Railway	Wensleydale Railway
D1966	47 266	47 629	**47 828**	-	(Joe Strummer)	BR Inter-City	Carnforth MPD	Owned by the D05 Preservation Company
D1970	47 269	**47 643**	-	-	-	Intercity (ScotRail branding)	Bo'ness and Kinneil Railway	Owned by the Scottish Railway Preservation Society Diesel Group
D1971	**47 270**	-	-	-	Swift	BR Blue	Carnforth MPD	Privately Owned
**D1994**	47 292	-	-	-	Her Majesty's Railway Inspectorate 175	BR Green	Churnet Valley Railway	Privately Owned

== See also ==
- List of preserved British Rail diesel locomotives
