= Wilfred Shepherd-Barron =

British civil engineer (1888–1979)

Wilfrid Philip Shepherd-Barron
- Born: 1888; Wick, Scotland
- Died: 1979 (aged 90–91); London, UK
- Engineering career
- Discipline: Civil,
- Institutions: Institution of Civil Engineers (president),

Wilfrid Philip Shepherd-Barron, MC, TD, LlD (1888–1979) was a British civil engineer and army officer.

== Early life ==
Shepherd-Barron was born Wilfrid Barron in Wick, Caithness, Scotland in 1888. Shepherd-Barron served in the Royal Engineers and received the Military Cross, he was also awarded the Territorial Decoration. After his service with the Royal Engineers he served in the voluntary, unpaid Engineer and Railway Staff Corps which provides technical expertise to the British Army. On 17 December 1946 he was promoted to lieutenant-colonel of that corps. He was promoted to colonel in the corps on 24 February 1950 and retired from the corps on 3 January 1956, receiving permission to retain his rank. Shepherd-Barron was awarded an honorary degree of Doctor of Laws by Aberdeen University. He served as president of the Institution of Civil Engineers from November 1953 to November 1954.

== Personal life ==
He married tennis player Dorothy Shepherd. Their son, John Shepherd-Barron became the inventor who pioneered the development of the Automated Teller Machine (ATM).

Professional and academic associations
Preceded by Henry Cronin	President of the Institution of Civil Engineers; November 1953 – November 1954	Succeeded by David Mowat Watson
