= George F. Sowers =

American civil engineer and academic

George F. Sowers (September 23, 1921 – October 23, 1996) was an American civil engineer and Regents Professor at the Georgia Institute of Technology. He also worked as a consultant for Law Engineering while maintaining his position as a professor.

== Biography ==
=== Early life and education ===
George Sowers was born in Cleveland, Ohio to George Sowers and Marie Tyler Sowers. He received his B.S. in Civil Engineering from Case Institute of Technology in 1942. After graduating he worked for the Tennessee Valley Authority, as a Hydraulic engineer. While at the Tennessee Valley Authority he met his future wife Frances Adair Lott, whom he married in 1944. He served in the United States Navy during World War II. After the war he attended Harvard University where he received his M.S. in Civil Engineering in 1947.

=== Career ===
Sowers was a member of the faculty of the School of Civil and Environmental Engineering at Georgia Tech from 1947 until his death in 1996. He advanced in his position beginning as an Assistant Professor until 1950, then Associate Professors until 1954, then Professor until 1965, and finally Regents Professor in 1965. From 1987 to 1996 he held the title of Regents Professor Emeritus. While a professor he also was an active consultant for Law Engineering. Even though this arrangement is unusual it continued until his death.

== Publications ==
- Websters New World Dictionary (Contribution on Engineering Terms) World Publishing Company, Cleveland, 1951.
- Earth and Rockfill Dam Engineering, Asia Publishing House, Bombay, India, 1961.
- Introductory Soil Mechanics and Foundations: Geotechnical Engineering, 4th Edition, Copyright 1979, Macmillan Publishing Co., Inc., New York, Collier Macmillan Publishers, London.
- Introductory Soil Mechanics and Foundations (with G. B. Sowers, Macmillan Co., New York, 1951, 3rd edition, 1970). Also International Edition, Macmillan Collier, Hong Kong, 1970, Spanish, Lumisa-Wiley, Mexico, 1972.
- Foundation Engineering (with Leonards et al.), McGraw-Hill Book Company, New York, 1961.
- Soil Mechanics in Highway Engineering (with A. Rico et al.) Trans Tech Publishers, Frankfort, 1988 (A translation of an earlier Spanish Language Text; Limusa-Wiley, Mexico).

He was also the author or co-author of more than 130 publications on geotechnical engineering, engineering geology, and seismology.
