= David Mowat Watson =

Scottish civil engineer

- Born: 1891
- Died: 1972 (aged 80–81)
- Engineering career
- Discipline: Civil
- Institutions: Institution of Civil Engineers (president)

David Mowat Watson (1891–1972) was a British civil engineer.

David was born in Aberdeen in 1891. His father was John Duncan Watson, a civil engineer regarded as a pioneer in the development of sewage treatment. David was the holder of a Bachelor of Science degree.

David Watson served as a temporary officer in the Yeomanry of the Territorial Force of the British Army during the First World War. He was promoted to lieutenant on 1 August 1917 with precedence of 1 June 1916. He retired from the army as a lieutenant on 2 March 1919, having transferred to the Royal Army Service Corps, being allowed to retain his rank.

After the war Watson became a civil engineer, going into professional practice with his retired father by 1940. During the Second World War Watson served in the army once more, this time as an officer of the Engineer and Railway Staff Corps, an unpaid Territorial Army unit which provides technical expertise to the British Army. He became a Lieutenant-Colonel in the corps on 29 October 1943 and was promoted to colonel on 26 February 1949. Watson's father died in 1946 and Watson retired from practice on 1 April 1951. He served as president of the Institution of Civil Engineers from November 1954 to November 1955, following in the footsteps of his father who had been president from November 1935 to November 1936.

Professional and academic associations
| Preceded by Wilfred Shepherd-Barron | President of the Institution of Civil Engineers; November 1954 – November 1955 | Succeeded by William Kelly Wallace |
