= Frank Baron (civil engineer) =

American civil engineer (1914–1994)

- Born: July 7, 1914; Chicago, Illinois, U.S.
- Died: October 17, 1994 (age 80); El Cerrito, California, U.S.
- Occupations: Engineer, college professor
- Spouse: Milena Yaneva (m. 1938)

Frank Martin Baron (July 7, 1914, Chicago, Illinois – October 17, 1994, El Cerrito, California) was an American educator who served as professor of civil engineering at the University of California, Berkeley and held an international reputation as an expert in the fields of bridge and roof-structure design, and seismic and wind analysis. He was twice the recipient of the prized Leon S. Moisseiff Award issued annually by the American Society of Civil Engineers (ASCE), and among his manifold professional affiliations, served as chairman of the US Council of the International Association for Bridge and Structural Engineering.

Baron's research interests traced the current of cutting-edge theory in civil engineering design and construction. As an undergraduate architecture and engineering student and masters-level graduate student in structural engineering at the University of Illinois, Baron had the privilege of studying under two premier names in engineering design: H. M. Westergaard, known for his research on the use of reinforced concrete for pavement and dams, and Hardy Cross, an undisputed authority on contemporary structural frame analysis.

== Career ==
After receiving his Sc. D. in structures and mechanics at Harvard University and becoming assistant professor at Harvard, Baron accepted a position on the civil engineering faculty at Yale University as associate professor. While at Yale, Baron further explored his dissertation interest in the shearing stresses of slabs, and also spearheaded the formulation of a new departmental curriculum in transportation studies. After spending four years in Hartford, Baron decided to accept a full-professorship at Northwestern University, where he stayed for seven years. Plasticity and the comparative behavior of riveted and bolted steel joints served as his principal research interests while there.

In 1953, Baron accepted an invitation from the University of California, Berkeley to assume a dual position as director of the Structural Engineering Laboratory and professor of civil engineering. Theory of design and planning became his primary instruction matter. He was perhaps best-known in the Northern California Bay Area for his structural and earthquake engineering analysis and design work on the Dumbarton, Golden Gate, and Bay bridges as well as for his role in designing the roof structure of the St. Mary's Cathedral in San Francisco.

== Publications ==
- "Influence Surfaces for Stresses in Slabs" (1941)
- "Torsion of Multiconnected Thin-Walled Cylinders" (1942)
- "Uncertainties in Design of Concrete Pavements Due to Differential Settlements and Volumetric Changes" (1943)

== Personal life and legacy ==
Frank Baron married Milena Yaneva in 1938. They hosted her nephew, engineer Peter Yanev, for ten years after he arrived from Bulgaria as a student.

Baron died on October 17, 1994, aged 80, in El Cerrito, California. His papers are in the Bancroft Library.
