= Frank Barron (psychologist) =

American psychologist and philosopher; pioneer of creativity and personality studies

Frank X. Barron (June 17, 1922 – October 6, 2002) was an American psychologist and philosopher. He is considered a pioneer in the psychology of creativity and in the study of human personality.

Barron was born in Lansford, Pennsylvania He received Ph.D. at University of California, Berkeley in 1950 and worked for over 30 years at the Berkeley Institute for Personality Assessment and Research. Barron was one of the first contemporary psychologists to study effects of psychedelic drugs. In 1960 he was a co-founder of the Harvard Psychedelic Drug Research.

Barron received the APA Richardson Creativity Award in 1969 and the Rudolf Arnheim Award in 1995.

== Major works ==
- Barron, F. The Psychology of Imagination. – "Scientific American", CXCIX, September, 1958.
- Barron, F. X. (1963). Creativity and Psychological Health. Princeton: Van Nostrand.
- Barron, F. X. (1963). Scientific Creativity. New York: John Wiley and Sons.
- Barron, F. X. (1965) The Creative Process and the Psychedelic Experience. Explorations magazine, Berkeley California, June–July.
- Barron, F. X. (1968). Creativity and Personal Freedom. New York: Van Nostrand.
- Barron, F. X. (1969). Creative Person, Creative Process. New York: Holt, Rinehart & Winston.
- Barron, F. X. (1972). Artists in the Making. New York: Seminar Press,
- Barron, F. X. (1979).The Shaping of Personality. New York: Harper & Row.
- Barron, F. X. (1995). No Rootless Flower. An Ecology of Creativity. Cresskill, NJ: Hampton.
- Barron, F. X., Montuori, A., Barron, A. (1997). Creators on Creating. New York, N.Y.: Tarcher Penguin.
