= Hugues Cosnier =

Hugues Cosnier (French pronunciation: [yg konje]) was a French engineer who conceived of the Briare Canal who was born in Tours, 1573, and died in 1629, in Paris.

He proposed to Henri IV the idea of building a canal from the Loire River to the River Seine. It would go from Briare to Montargis and then continue to the Seine via the Loing River. Cosnier began the canal in March 1604. He abandoned the project in 1610 with the death of Henri IV. In 1620, he was invited to continue his work on the canal. His death prevented him continuing the effort. Guillaume Boutheroue completed the canal between 1638 and 1642.

Also in 1603, he received a grant to establish silkworm breeding, sericulture, in Poitou. The endeavor failed.

In 1618, his idea of encircling Paris with canals was accepted, but was never constructed.

== See also ==
- Briare Canal
