= John Jellett =

John Jellett may refer to:

- John Hewitt Jellett, Irish mathematician
- John Holmes Jellett, British civil engineer
