= Ed McCann =

British civil engineer (born 1968)

Edward James McCann (born February 1968) is a British civil engineer. After studying at Imperial College London he joined Binnie & Partners and completed a masters degree in hydraulic engineering at the National University of Mexico. He went on to work on flood defence schemes and the design of Heathrow Terminal 5. After joining Expedition Engineering as a director in 2002 he worked on the Infinity Bridge, the Lee Valley VeloPark velodrome and the High Speed 2 railway. McCann served as president of the Institution of Civil Engineers for the 2021–2022 session.

== Biography ==
McCann was born in February 1968. He decided on a career in civil engineering while attending a careers fair at the age of 17, which had three engineering stalls. He rejected electrical engineering and mechanical engineering as the examples of work he was given by the presenters were missile guidance systems and tank propulsion mechanisms, and he didn't want to work on weaponry; the civil engineering presenter offered examples of work on roads, railways and water supplies. McCann went on to study for a bachelors degree in civil engineering from Imperial College London from 1986 to 1989.

After graduation, McCann joined Binnie & Partners in 1990 (the company merged with Black & Veatch in 1995), at the same time joining the Institution of Civil Engineers (ICE) as a graduate member. The company paid for McCann to study for a masters of science degree in hydraulic engineering at the National University of Mexico from 1992 to 1994, where he also learned Spanish. McCann works on the design of flood defence schemes in Nottingham before being seconded to contractor Taylor Woodrow for two years to work on a flood defence scheme in Cardiff. He became a chartered engineer and a full member of the ICE in 1998. McCann worked on the design of Heathrow Terminal 5 and reached the position of principal engineer at Black & Veatch.

In 2002 McCann joined Expedition Engineering, a small and medium enterprise, as an associate director and helped to lead the firm's conversion to an employee benefit trust in 2009. McCann was the company's project director for the Infinity Bridge in Stockton-on-Tees and for the 2012 Summer Olympics velodrome at Lee Valley VeloPark. He discussed the design of the velodrome with Team GB cyclist Chris Hoy who, he says, hold him the five secrets to building a fast cycle track. McCann and architect Mike Taylor's design was apparently successful; during the Olympics, cyclists on the track set nine world records and twelve Olympic records.

McCann has also worked on the redevelopment of La Monumental in Barcelona, England's High Speed 2 railway, Sizewell C nuclear power station and the Rolls-Royce small modular reactor factory. He helped Expedition Engineering to win Building Magazine's Engineering Consultant of the Year in 2012. After the London Olympics, he worked with the Rio de Janeiro 2016 Summer Olympics team to pass on learning. His role at Expedition is now focussed on start-up enterprises managed by the trust.

McCann became a fellow of the ICE in 2008 and, from 2010, sat on the organisation's council. From 2010 he has been a Royal Academy of Engineering visiting professor of innovation at the University of Strathclyde and University College London. He is also a fellow of the Royal Society of Arts and the Royal Academy of Engineering. He sat on the ICE executive board from 2013 to 2018, when he became a vice-president. He became senior vice-president in 2020 and served as president from November 2021 to November 2022. Since his presidency has joined an efficiency improvement working group at the Infrastructure Client Group.

Professional and academic associations
Preceded by Rachel Skinner	President of the Institution of Civil Engineers; November 2021 – November 2022	Succeeded by Keith Howells
