= George Matthew McNaughton =

- Born: 31 January 1893; Dundee, Scotland
- Died: 31 August 1966 (aged 73) unknown
- Engineering career
- Discipline: Civil,
- Institutions: Institution of Civil Engineers (president)

Sir George Matthew McNaughton CB (31 January 1893 – 31 August 1966) was a British civil engineer who specialised in hydraulic engineering. McNaughton was born in Dundee and received a degree in engineering from the University of St Andrews. He interrupted his studies to become an officer in the British Army during the First World War before he was forced to retire due to ill health. After the war he completed his degree and joined an engineering firm where his work included the Silent Valley Reservoir in Northern Ireland. In 1929 he entered government service at the Ministry of Health and eventually became the ministry's chief engineer. His work was recognised by an appointment as a Companion of the Order of the Bath and a knighthood. He retired in 1960 and served as president of the Institution of Civil Engineers for 1961–2.

== Early life ==
McNaughton was born in Dundee, Scotland on 31 January 1893. He was educated at Morgan Academy in Dundee before spending four years training under the supervision of J. Hannay Thompson, General Manager and Engineer of the Dundee Harbour Trust. McNaughton began a Bachelor of Science degree in engineering at the University of St Andrews but his course was interrupted by the outbreak of the First World War and he left in 1914 to enlist in the 2/2 Highland Brigade of the Royal Field Artillery. He held the substantive rank of Second Lieutenant but was promoted to Temporary Captain. He relinquished his commission on 23 February 1916 as a result of ill health. McNaughton returned to St Andrews and received his degree later that year.

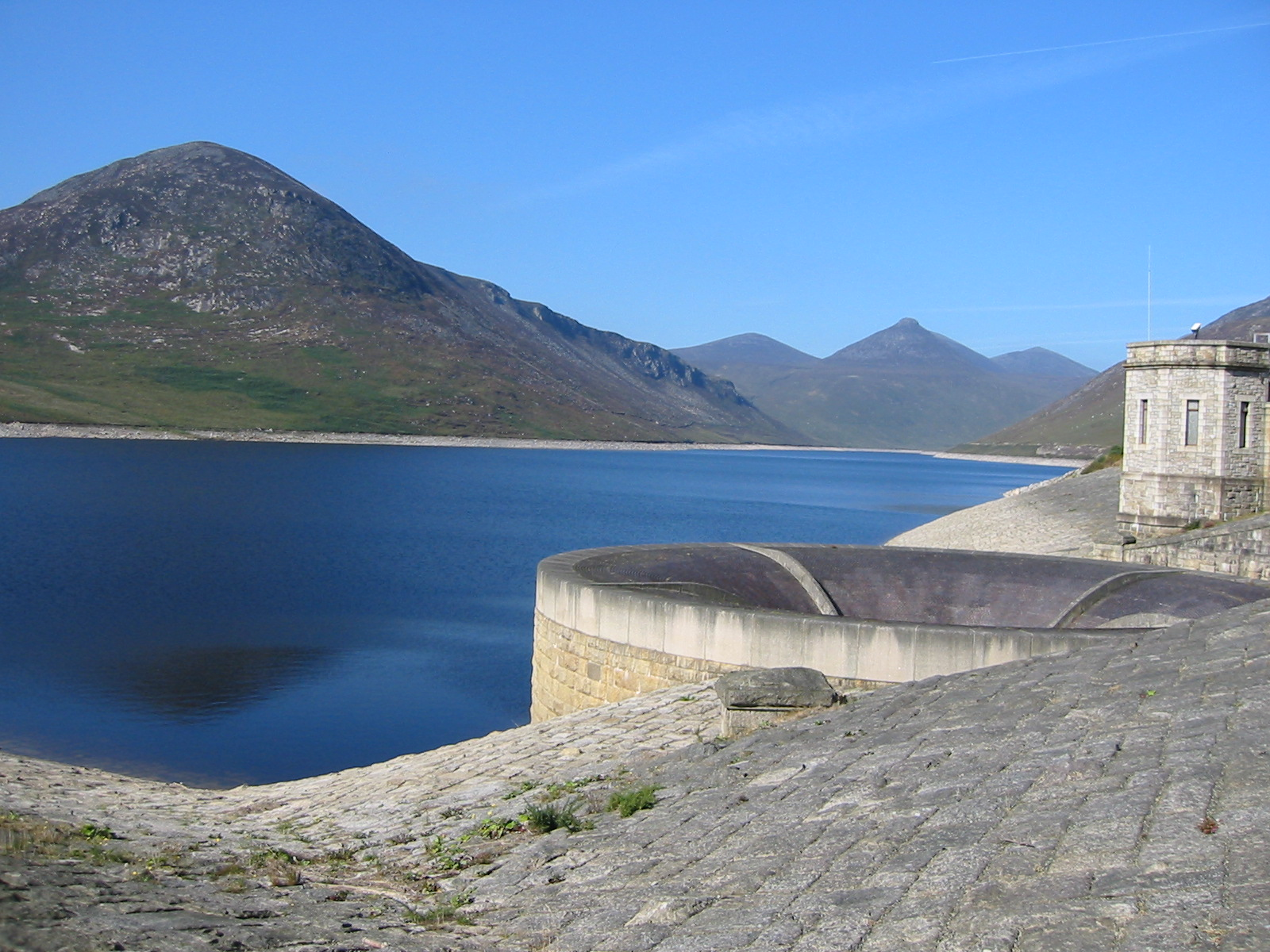
Silent Valley Reservoir

Upon graduation McNaughton joined the contracting department of S. Pearson & Son, working with Sir Ernest Moir and in 1918 was temporarily assigned to Sir Ernest's staff at the Ministry of Munitions and became an associate member of the Institution of Civil Engineers (ICE). He remained at the firm until 1929, working as an agent and engineer tendering for and designing reservoirs, harbours, tunnels and sewers including the £1 million Silent Valley Reservoir in Northern Ireland.

== Civil service ==
He entered government service in 1929, being appointed an engineering inspector for the Ministry of Health. McNaughton worked under the Chief Engineering Inspector, Sir Roger Gaskell Hetherington, and was responsible for conducting public enquiries for into water supplies, sewerage schemes, buildings, sea defences, river improvements and the use of Compulsory Purchase Orders. He was also involved in grant schemes to deprived areas, rural water supplies and air raid protection of essential engineering services. In 1938 he became a full member of the ICE and was also a member of the Institution of Mechanical Engineers.

On 31 August 1938 McNaughton transferred to the position of chief engineer to the Department of Health in Scotland and became chief engineer to the entire Ministry of Health in 1944. In 1948 he was appointed a Companion of the Order of the Bath. McNaughton transferred to the new Ministry of Health after reforms in 1951, remaining its chief engineer, and at the same time worked for the Ministry of Housing and Local Government. In the 1956 New Year Honours McNaughton's knighthood was announced and it was conferred on him by Queen Elizabeth The Queen Mother at Buckingham Palace on 7 February 1956.

== Other work ==
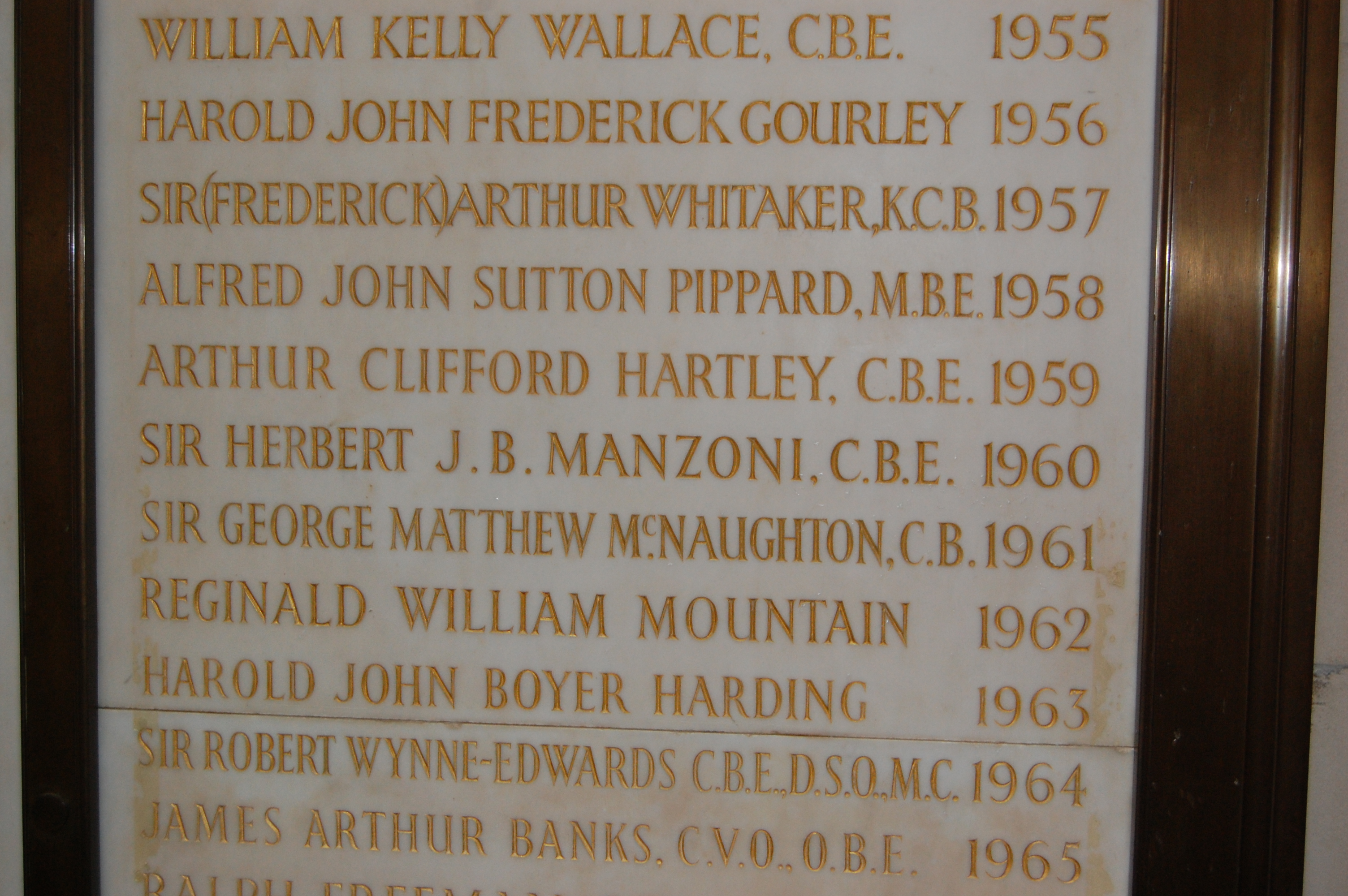
McNaughton's name on the list of Institution of Civil Engineers presidents, at their One Great George Street headquarters

McNaughton was associated closely with the Water Research Association from the start of its life, serving as a council member and their chairman, and helped to establish their research station at Medmenham. As a result of this McNaughton was elected an honorary member of British Waterworks Association in 1960. He retired from government service in 1960 to work as a director of the South-West Suburban Water Company, chairman of the East Surrey Water Company and a consultant for WV Vinn & Associates. McNaughton had been elected vice president of the ICE in 1956 and sat on several of their committees, being particularly keen to improve the status of engineers in society. He served as president of the institution for the November 1961 to November 1962 session. McNaughton was recognised world-wide for his specialism in water and in 1962 presented a paper to the UN's World Health Organization on the financial and economic aspects of water pollution prevention. He died on 31 August 1966. The National Portrait Gallery in London holds two portraits of McNaughton in their archives.

There is a record of his burial in Tealing Cemetery, Angus, Scotland.

Professional and academic associations
Preceded by William Kelly Wallace	President of the Institution of Civil Engineers; November 1961 – November 1962	Succeeded by Reginald William Mountain
