= David Orr (disambiguation) =

David Orr (born 1944) is an American politician who has served as County Clerk of Cook County, acting Mayor of Chicago, and a member of Chicago City Council.

David Orr may also refer to:

- David Malcolm Orr (born 1953), UK civil engineer
- David W. Orr (born 1944), American professor of environmental studies and politics
- David Orr (journalist) (born 1974), American journalist and poetry reviewer
- David Orr (businessman) (1922–2008), Anglo-Irish businessman, philanthropist and World War II veteran

== See also ==
- Dave Orr (1859–1915), American baseball player
