= BS 5930 =

British construction standard

BS 5930:2015, "the code of practice for site investigations", is a UK code of practice which came into effect on 31 July 2015 British Standards Institution. The document gives guidance on legal, environmental and technical matters relating to site investigation and includes a section on the description and classification of soils and rocks.

== History ==
It supersedes BS5930:1999+A2:2010, which itself supersedes BS 5930:1981 which in turn supersedes CP2001: 1957 "Site investigations".

BS5930:1999 was amended in December 2007 to avoid conflict with the newly introduced Eurocode 7 "Geotechnical Design" and the code is to be retained as a normative reference.

BS5930:2015 is a further full revision of the standard, and introduces some principal changes including: compliance with BS EN 1997-1 and BS EN 1997-2 and related test standards; new information on geophysical surveying and ground testing, and updated guidance on desk studies, field reconnaissance, ground investigations on contaminated ground and ground affected by voids; the requirements of data capture in the field and in the inclusion of this in reporting.

== Sections of the document ==
=== Section 1 Preliminary Considerations Pages 3–6 ===
Seven factors to be cognizant of at this stage are: suitability of the site for the proposed works, economic and adequacy of design, optimum method of construction with reference to potential issues due to ground and groundwater. The effect of changes to the ground and environment due to the works, and, therefore the effect on the works from these changes. Consideration of suitability on a selection of sites. And finally, the existing works and their implications. If a site has been used in the past, this is a major factor in the investigation, mining, quarrying, landfill or waste disposal, industrial usages, archaeological or ecological factors may all have a bearing on the intended works. The cost of an SI is low relative to the project cost and when conducted thoroughly can be a significant saving later. Investigations should evaluate the nature of the ground and groundwater. The size and nature of the works will have a bearing on the investigations as will its former use as a site or contamination of ground or groundwater. It will be considered in 3 stages. First a desk study to collate the information above as far as possible. Where a site is contaminated it is appropriate at this stage to plan site safety procedures for any further investigations. Planning the details of further investigations is appropriate too. Existing records, local authorities, industry, libraries, present or past OS maps and aerial photography or even anecdotal information are to be used. A site reconnaissance should also be conducted at this stage and includes a thorough visual inspection of any exposed cuttings and note taken of level of vegetation. The surroundings should also be noted. Second, a more detailed investigation is undertaken and finally a construction review – these shall be discussed later.

=== Section 2 Ground investigations Pages 7–23 ===
This is a natural follow on from the desk study, the objectives are similar – acquiring sufficient information for design, assessing the hazards. Depending on the works the investigations will differ i.e. defects of existing works, slope failure or new works, soil profile and groundwater condition should be established. Temporary or permanent changes should be investigated this involves changes in stresses and strains, moisture content, strength and compressibility. Certain areas will have old mines and underground cavities which need investigation. The ground investigation should be given enough time to be conducted before works are designed, this may involve in predicting ground condition at various times of the year. Due to the potential flexibility and size of an investigation, adequate supervision, equipment, testing, personnel, and audits should be provided in a safe manner. The extent of the GI can depend on many variables such as, character of site, availability of equipment and personnel and costs of methods. It should cover all ground affected by stresses and strains to an appropriate depth and breadth. Excavations, boreholes probing and geophysical surveying are used to investigate the ground. Intrusive investigations should be sited, spaced and backfilled with care. The GI should give sufficient information to make good decisions on design, construction material selection. The condition and accessibility on site may affect the equipment used. As the determination of groundwater conditions is important – the use of piezometers are at times used. Ground conditions from rock and gravel through to silts and clays will determine the equipments and approach used in the ground investigations as will made up, contaminated ground and under water ground. Geotechnical specialists are used in the investigation and interpretation of results.

=== Section 3 Field investigation Pages 24–45 ===
This section is more specific with regard to how the ground is investigated using methods such as excavating or drilling. Frequency of sampling and testing can be decided with the following in mind, the determination of the character and structure of all the strata and ground water conditions, the determination of the properties of the strata and the use of special techniques should ‘normal’ techniques not give satisfactory results. Shallow trial pits go to a maximum depth of 4–5 metres, comprehensive records should include the location and orientation of the pit and the face logged. Samples should be taken as soon as the pit is opened and closed as soon as possible properly – there are however advantages to leaving them open for a time. Samples are taken from deep trial pits and shafts at certain sites if necessary and if below the water table can become a more complicated process. Boring augers are in common use. There are two types of rotary drilling, open hole drilling and core drilling. The selection of the type and method used can depend on ground conditions and time and cost constraints. Recovered cores should be maintained as near as possible to its natural state until it is stored. In most cases it is inevitably disturbed. Another method is wash boring which is most applicable to sands, silts, and clays. However, these are not representative of the character and consistency of the penetrated strata. Ground water conditions are determined from water level in boreholes and the use of standpipe, hydraulic, electrical and pneumatic piezometers. Water samples should be representative and stored in appropriate containers. Backfilling should be well compacted to obviate the flow of groundwater to any aquifer below and/or settlement. The use of cement based grout can be used - bentonite is also used to decrease shrinkage. Sampling quality can be classified to determine depending on their disturbance and other factors such as, wet or dry ground. Samplers should conform to the standard. Sampling takes different forms i.e. – continuous sampling, the sand and window sampler and block sampling. Due to the cost of sample acquisition, samples should be treated with great care. Good methods of handling and labelling should be established.

=== Section 4 Field Tests Pages 46–98 ===
These are used when laboratory testing is not enough to determine the required properties of the ground. Laboratory samples are at times not considered to be representative and of insufficient quality, stress, pore pressure, and degree of saturation. Discontinuities in the ground can also warrant filed tests. Sample sizes depend on ground nature and test type. Boreholes are commonly used. The SPT is a simple and inexpensive test which can furnish a piling contractor with useful information. The van test is used to determine the shear strength of a soil - material with coarse silt or sand can mean unreliable results. Permeability is found by determining whether the relevant aquifer is confined on unconfined with cognizance of the normal fluctuations in the aquifer. Installation of the borehole itself may influence stresses. For a reliable test this should be followed by a pumping test. Packer tests are also used to measure the impermeability of grouted ground and permeability of dam foundations, strength and deformation data can also be taken. There are many types, mechanical, hydraulic and pneumatic, the latter being the most popular. A clean borehole with a properly seated packer is essential (cement mortar is sometime used). Geophysical logs from the boreholes used can be taken at the same time enhancing the value of the results. Pressuremeter tests are used to stress, stiffness and strength of the ground to be investigated. It can be used in most ground types. There are three main types – pre-bored, self bored and pushed in. Boring should do minimal damage to the ground as much as possible. an unload reload method of around three times is used to give an accurate value of stiffness. Probing from the surface is done using a steel rod. Mainly used at a preliminary stage, it is also useful to check surrounding ground but is unsuitable in soils with boulders and cobbles. Static probing is mostly conducted with the use of electric sensors. It is quick and cheap. Pumping allows the determination of groundwater conditions using pumping and observation wells. Data interpretation can be complicated and is classed in steady and non-steady states. Density testing is conducted using the average of three results to obtain a significant result. The use of the sand replacement and core cutter test are common and the use of water replacement, rubber balloon, and nuclear methods are also used. In-situ testing data is important to design of works. Stress measurement in rocks and soils can be determined. Bearing tests are used to determine the shear strength and deformation characteristics of a soil. In-situ shear testing is done using a system similar to the laboratory shear box test. Large scale testing should be assessed on a case-by-case basis. Slope failure or settlement of a structure after field tests have been conducted are examples of phenomena which may be considered as back analysis, this be conducted successfully when accompanied by a full investigation to determine the ground and ground water conditions. Geophysical surveying can be useful in site investigation for determining layers of rock other geological features, locating aquifers, mineral deposits, voids – natural or man-made and engineering properties of the ground. Electrical resistivity and seismic methods amongst others are used. This is a specialized field. The geophysical adviser should be involved at all stages. Experience has shown care should be taken when writing the specification for this type of work amongst other factors.

=== Section 5: Laboratory tests on samples Pages 101-111 ===
These tests are to be undertaken to describe and classify samples, investigate the fundamental behaviour of soils and rocks, obtain soil and rock parameters with reference to design requirements. Nature of ground and soil type, quality and how representative the sample is, method of analysis proposed, requirement of the design along with laboratory capabilities are all key factors in lab testing. Provision of good handling, labelling and storage should facilitate the nominated testing. Practical experience and skill in testing are invaluable and lead to reliable predictions being made. Sample quality should be borne in mind when testing, and finally reporting unambiguous results is desirable.

=== Section 6: Description of soils and rocks Pages 112-140 ===
Results of ground investigations may be needed even after samples have been disposed, leaving only descriptions of the soil to go on, for this reason good descriptions should be given. Designers also use past experience of materials of similar properties. Quality of samples should be reflected in the description. Soil characteristics are based on particle size grading of the coarser particles and plasticity of the finer particles. Main descriptions should be kept concise however they can be followed by further details if applicable such as, density, discontinuities, bedding, color, composite soil types, principal soil type, stratum name, geological formation, age and type of deposit and classification.

=== Section 7: Field reports Pages 141-157 ===
Field reports are filled in by the drillers, engineers, technicians, the field report should encourage the operator to record all the data necessary for the eventual interpretation necessary for the design or action necessary for new or remedial works. after a time, samples are destroyed and the only record maybe the field report, for this reason it should be composed and written in properly. Description of ground, ground water, boreholes and other factors should be recorded and commented on, recommendation with regard to safety and design maybe made also.
