= Anusha Shah =

Indian born civil engineer

President of Institution of Civil Engineers
- Incumbent
- Assumed office November 2023
- Preceded by: Keith Howells

Personal details
- Born: Kashmir, India
- Education: Master of Science
- Alma mater: University of Surrey; Jamia Millia Islamia
- Occupation: Civil engineer

Anusha Shah is an Indian-born civil engineer. Elected the 159th President of the Institution of Civil Engineers, she became the third woman and first person of colour to hold the position, taking office in November 2023.

== Early life and education ==
Shah grew up in Kashmir. She studied civil engineering at Jamia Millia Islamia in New Delhi, India. In 1999, after winning a Commonwealth scholarship, she studied for an MSc in water and environmental engineering at the University of Surrey in the UK.

== Professional career ==
Shah specialised in water and environmental engineering from the late 1990s. After completing her first degree, she worked as a project engineer for New Delhi-based Development Alternatives, overseeing production of compressed earth building blocks, and sparking a career interest in sustainable development. She then joined IramConsult, a local partner of Royal HaskoningDHV, to work in Kashmir on rehabilitating a lake. After completing her master's degree, she was seconded by Black & Veatch to work for Clancy Docwra as a design engineer on United Utilities' Haweswater scheme in the UK's Lake District. In 2008, Shah moved to Jacobs, becoming technical director for sustainable solutions and utilities in 2010, and a director of the firm in 2018. In 2019, she moved to Arcadis, becoming senior director for resilient cities and UK climate adaptation lead. She is currently seconded to the Eiffage, Kier, Ferrovial and BAM Nuttall joint venture on High Speed 2 as senior director of environmental consents.

=== Institutional and board roles ===
Shah is a Fellow of the Institution of Civil Engineers. Prior to succeeding Keith Howells and becoming President of the Institution of Civil Engineers in November 2023, she served on the Thomas Telford board, the ICE Executive Board, ICE's Fairness, Inclusion and Respect panel, the ICE research and development panel and the ICE qualifications panel.

Shah is a non-executive director of the Met Office, UK and a Green Alliance trustee. She represents Arcadis at the London Climate Change Partnership and 50L Home Initiative of the World Business Council for Sustainable Development. She is a past chair of the Thames Estuary Partnership Board, which works towards sustainable management of the River Thames. Shah has been a chair and also a judge of the Ofwat Water Breakthrough Challenge for two consecutive terms.

=== Academia ===
In 2021, Shah was made an honorary professor by the University of Wolverhampton for knowledge transfer. In the same year, she received an honorary doctorate from the University of East London for her contributions to climate change in engineering. Shah is a visiting professor at the University of Edinburgh and is a Royal Academy of Engineering visiting professor at King's College London.

== Awards ==
Shah won the Civil Engineering Contractors Association Fairness Inclusion and Respect Inspiring Engineers Award 2019, and was honoured in New Civil Engineer's 2019 Recognising Women in Engineering awards for her contributions to gender diversity. In 2020, she was named as one of Climate Reframe's leading BAME voices on climate change in the UK. In 2023, she was selected by the Women's Engineering Society as one the UK's Top 50 Women in Sustainability.
