= Alastair Paterson =

British civil engineer (1924–2021)

Alastair Craig Paterson CBE, FREng
- Born: 15 January 1924; Glasgow, Scotland, U.K.
- Died: 20 July 2021 (aged 97); Chichester, England, U.K.
- Education: Royal Technical College
- Occupation: Civil Engineer
- Known for: President of the Institution of Civil Engineers, President of the Institution of Structural Engineers
- Notable work: Dungeness B power station, Aberdeen School of Art, Aber Swing Bridge, Carnaerfon

Alastair Craig Paterson CBE, FREng (15 January 1924 – 20 July 2021) was a British civil engineer. Born in Glasgow, Scotland, he was the 124th President of the Institution of Civil Engineers from November 1988 to November 1989 and President of the Institution of Structural Engineers from 1984 to 1985.

== Career ==
After graduating from the Royal Technical College, Glasgow in 1944, Paterson joined the Royal Electrical and Mechanical Engineers and reached the rank of Major. He completed his service in 1948 having gained the position of Deputy Assistant Director Mechanical Engineering (North Burma and China).

In 1948 Paterson joined Merz & McLelland in Esher, then Aberdeen. In 1958 he left to join Taylor Woodrow working with Frank Gibb on nuclear power station projects.

He became a partner of F R Bullen in 1960 and founded their Glasgow office. He was involved in the structural engineering of the Aberdeen School of Art. In 1966 he moved to London becoming Senior Partner and worked on projects such as Dungeness B power station and Aber Swing Bridge, Carnaerfon.

He became Chairman of the British Consultants' Bureau in 1976. He was President of the Institution of Structural Engineers from 1984 to 1985, and President of the Institution of Civil Engineers from November 1988 to November 1989.

Paterson died in Chichester in July 2021 at the age of 97.

Professional and academic associations
Preceded by Sir William Francis (civil engineer)	President of the Institution of Civil Engineers; November 1988 – November 1989	Succeeded by Peter Frank Stott
