= Barry Clarke =

Barry Clarke may refer to:

- Barry Clarke (bishop) (born 1952), Anglican bishop of Montreal
- Barry Clarke (engineer), president of the Institution of Civil Engineers
- Barry Clarke, member of English folk rock band Trees

== See also ==
- Barry Clark (disambiguation)
