= Norman Rowntree =

British civil engineer (1912–1991)

Sir Norman Rowntree
- Born: Norman Andrew Forster Rowntree; 11 March 1912; Edmonton, Middlesex, England
- Died: 22 July 1991 (aged 79); Ellesmere Port, Cheshire, England
- Engineering career
- Discipline: Civil engineering
- Institutions: Institution of Civil Engineers (president)

Sir Norman Andrew Forster Rowntree (11 March 1912 – 22 July 1991) was a British civil engineer.

Rowntree was born in London in 1912 and held a Bachelor of Science degree in engineering. He worked as an engineering consultant for Alcott & Lomax, who would be acquired by Babtie in 2000. During his consulting career he was involved with the construction of water pumping stations. Rowntree was appointed director of the Water Resources Board (WRB), a national water planning body established in 1964. The WRB was dominated by civil engineers and focussed its efforts on implementing structural solutions to water resource problems. Rowntree was a keen proponent of that school of thought, saying in 1962 that "the solution of water supply problems … will require the construction and operation of large works and highly‐developed technical control". Under Rowntree's leadership the WRB was able to undertake what was the largest scheme of water planning yet seen in England and Wales.

Rowntree was made a Knight Bachelor in Elizabeth II's 1970 Birthday Honours. Rowntree gave the Institution of Electrical Engineers 1972 Graham Clark Lecture on "Conservation and use of water resources" and the same year wrote an article for the Proceedings of the Royal Society B entitled "Water Resources Management in England and Wales". By 1974, he had become a Professor and, on 2 December that year, was awarded an honorary Doctor of Science degree by City University London.

Rowntree was elected president of the Institution of Civil Engineers (ICE) for the November 1975–76 session. He used his inaugural presidential address to emphasise that "the duty remains with engineers and other experts to minimise the range of intangible issues… the inaccuracy of words and the opportunities of distortion are enormous. In the present age of unreason this is a real danger and may be responsible for many of our present ills". He was a chartered engineer and a fellow of the institution. In 1976 Rowntree was employed by the Department of Civil Engineering of the University of Manchester Institute of Science and Technology and, on 8 December, gave the 63rd Thomas Hawksley lecture to the Institution of Mechanical Engineers on the history of water engineering. In August 1986 he wrote an article in the Proceedings of the ICE comparing water resources planning in the United Kingdom with that of New Jersey in the USA.

Professional and academic associations
Preceded by William Gordon Harris	President of the Institution of Civil Engineers; November 1975 – November 1976	Succeeded by John Walter Baxter
