= John Walter Baxter =

British civil engineer (1917–2003)

John Walter Baxter CBE
- Born: 4 June 1917; London, England
- Died: 21 October 2003 (aged 86)
- Education: BSc in Engineering, City & Guilds College
- Occupation: Civil Engineer
- Spouse: Jessie Baxter
- Children: 1 daughter
- Awards: Commander of the Order of the British Empire (CBE), 1974

John Walter Baxter CBE (4 June 1917 in London–21 October 2003) was a British civil engineer.

Baxter left Westminster City School at the age of 16. He was a graduate of the City & Guilds College, with a BSc in engineering.

He worked for Trussed Concrete Steel Company from 1936 to 1941, Royal Dutch Shell from 1941 to 1952. He met Guy Maunsell and joined the firm of Maunsell, Posford, and Pavry in 1952. John Baxter was a founding partner of the new firm of G Maunsell & Partners in 1955 and was a senior partner from 1959 to 1980. He was responsible for designing the Westway. His work appears in ICE Proceedings. He was appointed CBE in the 1974 New Year Honours and was elected president of the Smeatonian Society of Civil Engineers in 1986.

He married Jessie in 1941 and they had a daughter.

Professional and academic associations
Preceded by Norman Rowntree	President of the Institution of Civil Engineers; November 1976 – November 1977	Succeeded by Alan Muir Wood
