= Hubert Shirley-Smith =

British civil engineer (1901–1981)

Sir Hubert Shirley-Smith
- Hubert Shirley-Smith
- Born: 13 October 1901; London, UK
- Died: 10 February 1981 (aged 79); London, UK
- Engineering career
- Discipline: Civil
- Institutions: Institution of Civil Engineers (president), Imperial College, London (Fellow)
- Projects: Howrah Bridge, Forth Road Bridge

Sir Hubert Shirley-Smith, CBE, BSc, MICE (13 October 1901 – 10 February 1981) was a British civil engineer.

Shirley-Smith helped to design the Howrah Bridge in Calcutta for the Indian Public Works Department in 1943. He also served in the Engineer and Railway Staff Corps, an unpaid, volunteer Territorial Army unit which provides engineering expertise to the British Army and was gazetted as a major of that corps on 6 October 1953 In 1962 he worked as site agent for the ADC bridge company during construction of the Forth Road Bridge.

He served as president of the Institution of Civil Engineers from November 1967 to November 1968, during the 150th anniversary of that institution, and was made a Fellow of Imperial College, London in 1966 Shirley-Smith was a consulting engineer and worked for W.V. Zinn & Associates of London from 1969 to 1978. During 1968 Shirley-Smith was president of the International Association for Bridge and Structural Engineering and helped to arrange the first joint-conferences of the Institution of Civil Engineers and the American Society of Civil Engineers.

Shirley-Smith was honoured with an appointment as a Knight Bachelor on 1 January 1969 in the Queen's New Year Honours, being knighted by the Queen at Buckingham Palace on 7 March 1969. He was appointed a first class engineer member of the Smeatonian Society of Civil Engineers in 1969. Shirley-Smith was also an author and wrote The World's Great Bridges and the Encyclopædia Britannica article on bridges. In 1971 he lived in Orpington in Kent. Shirley-Smith died on 10 February 1981.

Professional and academic associations
Preceded by Ralph Freeman	President of the Institution of Civil Engineers; November 1967 – November 1968	Succeeded by John Holmes Jellett
