= Reginald Mountain =

British civil engineer (1899–1981)

Reginald William Mountain
- Born: 1899; London
- Died: 1981 (aged 81–82)
- Engineering career
- Discipline: Civil,
- Institutions: Institution of Civil Engineers (president)

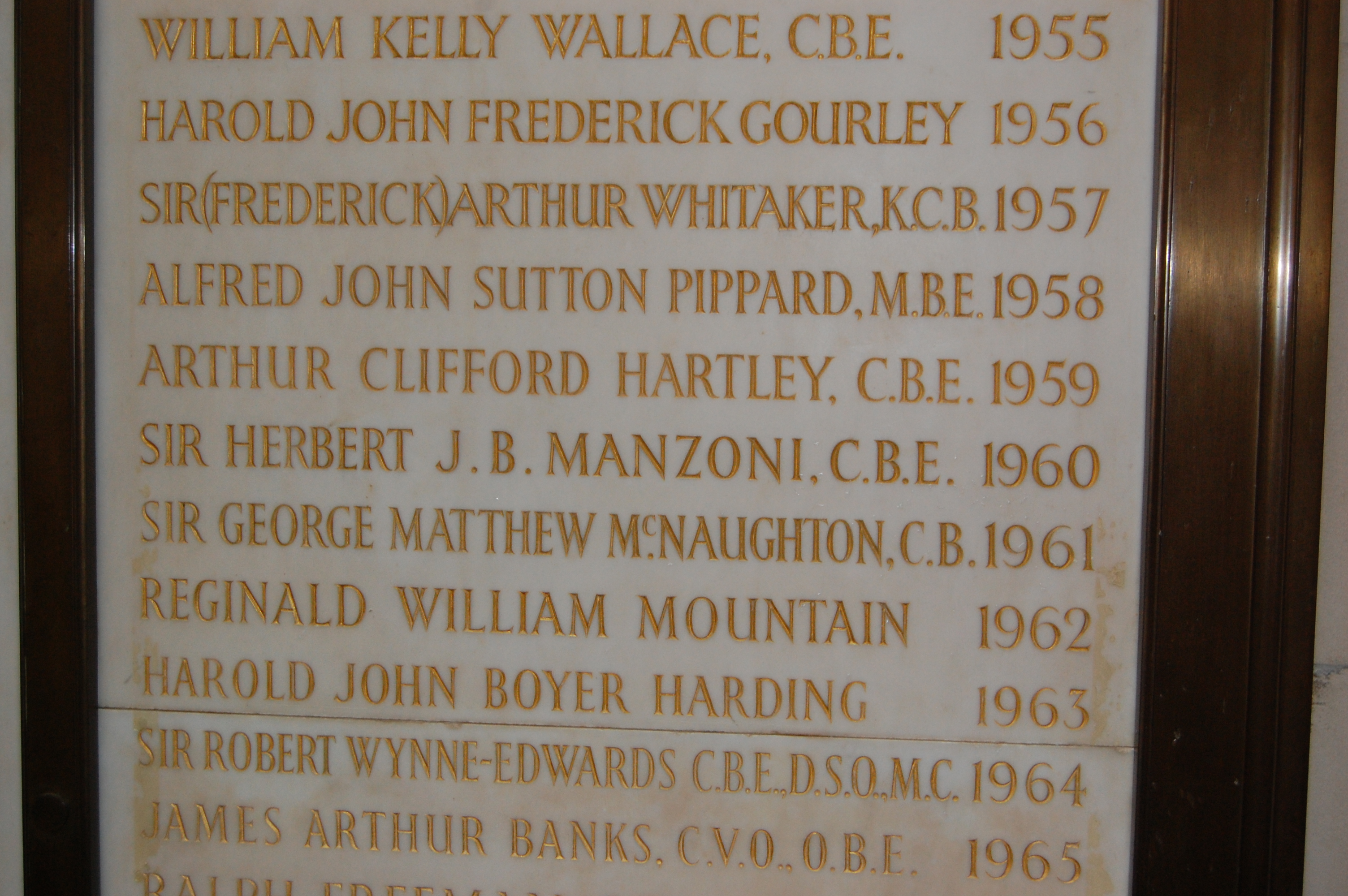
Mountain's name on the list of Institution of Civil Engineers presidents, at their One Great George Street headquarters

Reginald William Mountain (1899–1981) was a British civil engineer.

Mountain was born in London in 1899. He served as an officer of the British Army's Royal Engineers during the First World War. From 1919 to 1922 Mountain studied for a Bachelor of Science degree in engineering at Northampton Engineering Day College, graduating with a degree awarded by London University. He left the regular army and was placed in the Royal Engineers Special Reserve of Officers on 1 July 1921. At that point he held the rank of Second Lieutenant with seniority of 16 April 1921. He remained in the reserve and was promoted to Lieutenant on 7 August 1925 with his seniority backdated to 16 April 1923. Mountain left the reserve and resigned his commission on 15 November 1930.

Mountain undertook three years of pupillage with an engineer in Switzerland. During this time he wrote an academic paper on "Rotary converters for railway use" that was published by the Institution of Civil Engineers (ICE) and won the institution's Miller Prize and James Forrest Medal. By 1931 Mountain had become an Associate Member of the ICE and was involved in hydro-electric energy and electricity systems. Mountain continued to publish academic papers on subjects relating to hydroelectricity including a description of the method of electricity transmission used by the Central Electricity Board in Scotland and economic aspects of hydroelectric developments. He wrote about the Galloway hydro-electric power scheme, co-authoring a book on the subject and writing a journal article on the connection of the scheme with the National Grid. Mountain collaborated with fellow hydroelectric engineer Angus Paton on a paper describing Paton's Owen Falls hydroelectric scheme built in 1948.

Mountain served as President of the ICE for the November 1962 to 1963 session. By this point he was a member of both the ICE and the Institution of Electrical Engineers. Mountain died in 1981.

Professional and academic associations
Preceded by George Matthew McNaughton	President of the Institution of Civil Engineers; November 1962 – November 1963	Succeeded by Harold Harding
