= William Francis (civil engineer) =

British civil engineer (1926–2025)

Sir William Francis CBE FREng
- Born: Horace William Alexander Francis; 31 August 1926; Clydebank, Scotland
- Died: 27 September 2025 (aged 99)
- Spouse: Gwendoline Maud Dorricott
- Parent(s): Horace Fairie Francis & Jane McMinn Murray
- Engineering career
- Discipline: Civil
- Institutions: Institution of Civil Engineers (president)

Sir Horace William Alexander Francis CBE FREng (31 August 1926 – 27 September 2025) was a British civil engineer.

== Background ==
Francis was born in Clydebank, Scotland on 31 August 1926 to Horace Fairie Francis and Jane McMinn Murray. He studied at Glasgow's Royal Technical College, which is now part of Strathclyde University. He married, in 1949, Gwendoline Maud Dorricott and had two sons and two daughters. Francis died on 27 September 2025, at the age of 99. His funeral took place at Emstrey Crematorium, Shrewsbury, on 4 November 2025.

== Career ==
Francis worked on many construction projects in the United Kingdom and abroad including manufacturing facilities, bridges, power stations and offshore structures. He spent 25 years working with the engineering contractor Tarmac plc and was the company's chief operating officer and vice-chairman. Francis also served as executive director of construction for the Trafalgar House conglomerate and as non-executive director of its oil and gas interests.

He worked as a government advisor for approximately 30 years, serving on several advisory boards such as the British Overseas Trade Board and the Export Credit Guarantee Department. Francis also worked as a director of the British Railways Board between 1994 and 1997 and as chairman of the Black Country Development Corporation.

On 1 November 1982, Francis was appointed major in the British Army's Engineer and Railway Staff Corps, an invitation-only, unpaid unit of 60 engineering and logistics professionals that provide advice to the British armed forces on specialist and technical matters. He was promoted to lieutenant-colonel on 8 July 1986 and became supernumerary to the unit on 17 August 1992.

== Later life ==
Francis worked as director of Peakbeam Ltd and Longden Properties. He was a principal partner in Security Composites Limited, a thermoplastic manufacturer based in Shrewsbury, where he developed a thermoplastic-based formwork for in-situ concrete works.

Francis was an Honorary Life Vice-President of the Lighthouse Club, a national charity that provides for the families of construction workers killed or injured at work. He was a member for over 40 years and served as president from 1990–5 and helped the club to introduce a corporate membership grade.

== Honours ==
Francis was appointed a Commander of the Order of the British Empire in 1976 and was knighted on 25 July 1989 in a ceremony at Buckingham Palace.

He was awarded two honorary doctorates, an honorary Doctor of Laws (LLD) from the University of Strathclyde in 1988, and an honorary Doctor of Science (DSc) from Aston University in 1990.

Francis was a Fellow of the Royal Academy of Engineering and of the Institution of Civil Engineers and served as president of the latter between November 1987 and November 1988.

He was involved with the Civil Engineers Club, a social organisation for members of his profession, and awarded their inaugural Thomas Telford Trophy for the winner of the golf competition at the Wentworth Club in 1986. He was awarded the 1991 Chartered Institution of Highways and Transportation Institution Award for excellence within the transportation profession.

Professional and academic associations
Preceded by David Gwilym Morris Roberts	President of the Institution of Civil Engineers; November 1987 – November 1988	Succeeded by Alastair Craig Paterson
