= Jean Venables =

British civil engineer and professor (born 1948)

Professor Jean Venables CBE, BSc (Eng), MSc, DSc, FREng CEng, CEnv, FICE, FCGI, MCIWEM
- Born: 1948 (age 77–78)
- Education: Imperial College London
- Known for: First female president of the Institution of Civil Engineers Chair of the Nuclear Liabilities Fund Council Member RNLI Chair of ICE Professional Conduct Panel
- Spouse: Roger Venables
- Awards: Garth Watson Medal; FREng

Jean Venables (born June 1948) is a British civil engineer who in November 2008 became the 144th President of the Institution of Civil Engineers, the first woman to be elected to the position.

== Career ==
Venables has worked on flood risk management projects. She was chairman of the Thames Regional Flood Defence Committee for a period of nine years.

From 2003 to 2010 Venables was chair of the Thames Estuary Partnership, a British charity that provides a framework for managing the Thames Estuary.

She was also chief executive of the Association of Drainage Authorities (ADA), from Jan 2006 to March 2015, where she led ADA's role of representing organisations related to water level management and flood risk management, such as Internal Drainage Boards, flood defence committees, environmental agencies, local authorities and various associate members.

Venables has been associated with formation of CEEQUAL. From 2014 to 2016, Venables was chair of the Nuclear Liabilities Fund, succeeding Lady Balfour.

== Awards and recognition ==
Venables was made a Commander of the Order of the British Empire in the 2010 Birthday Honours. She had earlier been made an Officer of the Order of the British Empire (OBE) in the 2004 New Year Honours for services as Chairman of the Thames Region Flood Defence Committee and before that a Member of the Order of the British Empire (MBE) in the 1997 New Year Honours for services to civil engineering.

The University of Nottingham, The University of Kent, Kingston University and Abertay University have each awarded her an honorary doctorate.

She is also a Fellow of the Royal Academy of Engineering and a visiting professor at the University of Southampton and at Imperial College London (where she studied). Previously, she was a visiting professor at Strathclyde University.

In 2001, she was awarded the Garth Watson Medal for services to the Institution of Civil Engineers.

In 2011, the Institution of Civil Engineers instituted the Jean Venables Medal. It is awarded to its best Technician Professional Review candidate.

== Personal life ==
Venables is married to Roger Venables. They operate the company "Venables Consultancy". Roger Venables is Visiting Professor in Engineering for Sustainable Development at Queen's University, Belfast.

== Bibliography ==
- —— (1989). Preparing for the Professional Examination of the Institution of Civil Engineers. Thomas Telford Ltd. ISBN 978-1870325158.
- —— (1991). Preparing for Chartered Membership of the Institution of Civil Engineers (2 ed.). Thomas Telford Ltd. ISBN 978-1870325653.
- —— (1995). Preparing for the Professional Reviews of the Institution of Civil Engineers. Whittles Publishing. ISBN 978-1870325318.
- —— (2009). Urban flooding.

Professional and academic associations
Preceded by David Malcolm Orr	President of the Institution of Civil Engineers; November 2008– November 2009	Succeeded by Paul Jowitt
