= Angus Fulton =

British civil engineer (1900–1983)

Angus Anderson Fulton CBE FRSE FICE FIEE
- Born: 10 January 1900; Motherwell, Lanarkshire, Scotland
- Died: 21 June 1983 (aged 83); Inveresk, Mid-Lothian, Scotland
- Engineering career
- Discipline: Civil,
- Institutions: Institution of Civil Engineers (president), Institution of Mechanical Engineers (fellow), Institution of Electrical Engineers (fellow), Royal Society of Edinburgh (fellow), Smeatonian Society of Civil Engineers (member)

Angus Anderson Fulton (10 January 1900 – 21 June 1983) was a British civil engineer.

== Life ==
Fulton was born in Motherwell, Lanarkshire, Scotland on 10 January 1900. His father was an associate member of the Institution of Civil Engineers (ICE) for more than 50 years and Angus followed in his footsteps to become a civil engineer. Fulton was educated at the High School of Dundee, and University College, Dundee, part of the University of St Andrews where he was a cadet in the senior division of the Officer Training Corps. Following his graduation in 1922 with a Bachelor of Science degree he was commissioned as a Second Lieutenant into the 51st (Highland) Division engineers section of the Territorial Army Royal Engineers.

In 1953 he was elected a Fellow of the Royal Society of Edinburgh. His proposers were Robert McAdam, Thomas Cooper, 1st Baron Cooper of Culross, James Cameron Smail, David Kerr Duff and James Reed.

Fulton was elected president of the ICE for the November 1969 to November 1970 session. He was awarded an honorary Doctor of Laws degree by the University of Dundee on 6 July 1970. Fulton was involved with many institutions and was elected a fellow of the Institution of Civil Engineers, the Institution of Mechanical Engineers, the Institution of Electrical Engineers and the Royal Society of Edinburgh. In addition he was also elected a member of the Smeatonian Society of Civil Engineers in 1972. Fulton was appointed as Commander of the Order of the British Empire. He died at Inveresk, Mid-Lothian, Scotland on 21 June 1983.

Professional and academic associations
| Preceded by John Holmes Jellett | President of the Institution of Civil Engineers; November 1969 – November 1970 | Succeeded by Angus Paton |
