= Douglas Oakervee =

British civil engineer (born 1940)

Sir Douglas Edwin Oakervee (born December 1940) is a British civil engineer who is a past chairman of both High Speed 2 and Crossrail, and was the 139th president of the Institution of Civil Engineers. He was awarded the CBE in 2010 for his contributions to civil engineering and appointed Knight bachelor in 2022 for services to transport and infrastructure delivery.

== Early life and education ==
Oakervee was born in 1940 in northwest London and attended Willesden Technical College.

== Civil engineering projects ==
Oakervee first worked as an apprentice joiner on London tower blocks. He attended night school to obtain his first engineering qualifications. His first management role was supervising construction for Dublin's Grand Canal Tunnel drainage project.

In 1975, he moved to Hong Kong to work on the development of the MTR underground network.

In 1982, he founded Oakervee Perrett and Partners, an engineering design and project management company, later one of the key designers of London Underground's Jubilee Line Extension. He was the chief tunnel engineer on the Hong Kong mass transit railway project. From 2012 to 2014 he was chairman of the company constructing the High Speed 2 (HS2) railway in England.

== HS2 review ==
In June 2019, Boris Johnson, then a candidate for the Conservative Party leadership, said he would ask Oakervee to lead a review of the plans for HS2. In August, with Johnson now Prime Minister, the review was announced and terms of reference were published by the Department for Transport. Work was completed in November but its report – known as the Oakervee Review – was not published until February 2020. The report concluded that the original rationale for HS2 was still valid as "there is a need for greater capacity (both more trains on tracks and more seats on trains and reliability on the GB rail network)".

== Irish Sea tunnel ==
In October 2020, it was announced that Sir Peter Hendy would lead an independent review into the feasibility of various projects designed to improve the UK's infrastructure, among them a potential fixed link between Great Britain and Northern Ireland. This could take the form of a bridge (referred to as the Irish Sea Bridge) or a tunnel, and investigation of a potential rail tunnel would be undertaken by Oakervee. He observed that the collapse of Flybe had reduced opportunities to fly into Northern Ireland.

== Honours and awards ==
- 2000 Appointed OBE in the diplomatic list of the 2000 New Year Honours for services to civil engineering overseas
- 2003 Elected president of the Institution of Civil Engineers
- 2008 Awarded the Institution of Civil Engineers Gold Medal
- 2010 Appointed CBE in the Birthday Honours for services to civil engineering
- 2020 Elected president of the Smeatonian Society of Civil Engineers
- 2022 Knighted in the 2022 New Year Honours for services to transport and infrastructure delivery.

Professional and academic associations
Preceded by Adrian Long	President of the Institution of Civil Engineers; November 2003 – November 2004	Succeeded by Colin John Clinton
