= William Gordon Harris =

British civil engineer (1912–2005)

William Harris
- Engineering career
- Discipline: Civil
- Institutions: Institution of Civil Engineers (president)

Sir William Gordon Harris KBE CB FREng (10 June 1912 – 20 February 2005) was a British civil engineer. His early career was with the London, Midland and Scottish Railway and in the Sudanese Irrigation Department before he began a 26-year spell with the Admiralty Civil Engineers Department. Harris rose to become Civil Engineer in Chief in 1959 and was responsible for building facilities to cope with the change in focus of the Royal Navy from gunnery ships to aircraft carriers and submarines, including the nuclear submarine docks at Faslane. Harris was later made director-general of highways in the Ministry of Transport during which time he was responsible for the construction of the 650 miles of motorway, a focus on ground investigation at pre-tender stage and the development of new motorway signalling and telecommunications systems. He later entered private practice as a consulting engineer and was chairman of the Port of Dover. Harris also served as president of the Institution of Civil Engineers and of the Smeatonian Society of Civil Engineers.

== Early career ==
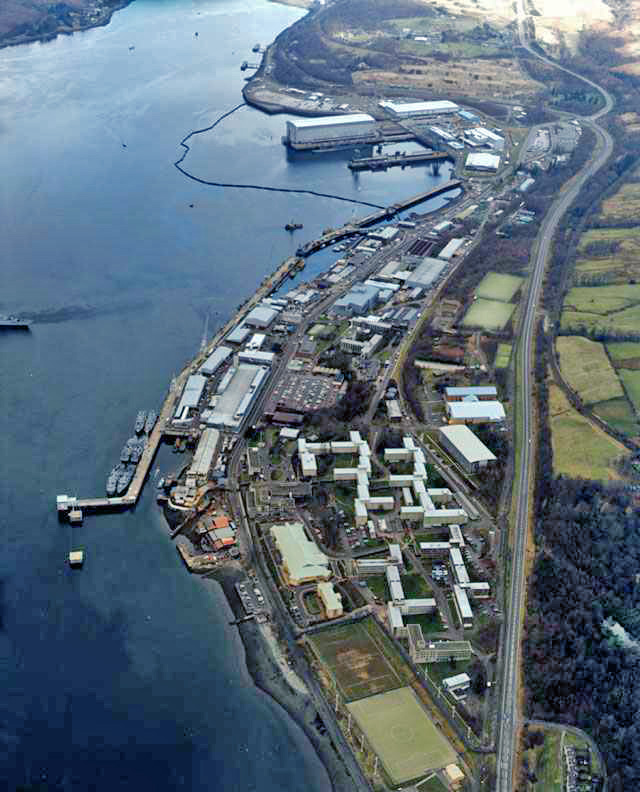
The docks at Faslane

Harris was born in Liverpool on 10 June 1912 to Captain James Whyte Harris and Margaret Roberts Buchanan Harris (née Forsyth). His father was a captain in the Royal Naval Reserve. Harris was educated at Liverpool College before studying the Mechanical Sciences Tripos at Sidney Sussex College, University of Cambridge. Harris worked for the London, Midland and Scottish Railway as an engineer from 1932 until 1935 when he transferred to the Irrigation Department of Sudan. He returned from Sudan in 1937 to work in the Civil Engineer's Department of the Admiralty, the start of a 26-year association with that department. Harris married Margaret Harvie in 1938, they had three sons and one daughter together and were grandparents to sixteen. Harris received several promotions during his time with the Admiralty, becoming Assistant Civil Engineer in Chief in 1950, Deputy Civil Engineer in Chief in 1955 and Civil Engineer in Chief in 1959. Harris gained a Commonwealth Fund of New York Scholarship in 1950 which allowed him to spend two years with the US Navy Bureau of Yards and Docks. In 1960 he became the Director-General of Navy Works at the Admiralty, a post he held until the reorganisation which followed the merger of the Royal Navy, Royal Air Force and British Army administrations into the Ministry of Defence in 1963. During his time with the Admiralty Harris saw the last large gunnery ships go out of service to be replaced with submarines and aircraft carriers. This change of fleet composition required a revolution in dockyard facilities, for which he was responsible, especially those at Faslane, the submarine base.

== Director-general of works and highways ==
In the 1963 Queen's Birthday Honours Harris was appointed a Companion of the Order of the Bath, and also became Director-General of Works at the Ministry of Public Building and Works. From 1965 Harris was the Director-General of Highways at the Ministry of Transport (later the Department of the Environment). During this time he was responsible for all design, construction and maintenance of roads in England. He was responsible for securing agreement from the county councils and the Association of Consulting Engineers on road schemes and for presenting these to the secretary of state, Barbara Castle. In 1967-68 he split England into six regions, each the responsibility of a roads construction unit to manage the delivery of regional infrastructure. Harris was chair of a committee into contracting by the ministry and recommended that competitive tendering be maintained but that more ground investigation was required into the subsoil prior to tender and that this information should be shared with the contractor. He also implemented the use of standard methods of compaction in place of the more time-consuming method of validation testing after the works were completed. Harris implemented a new signalling system for motorways and implemented a new telecommunications system, for which he allocated £27 million of funding. Harris's tenure as Director-General saw the construction of 650 miles of motorways and an expenditure of £2.2 billion on new road construction.

Harris was appointed a Knight Commander of the Order of the British Empire in the 1969 Birthday Honours. Harris was the chief British delegate to the Permanent Association of Navigation Congresses (PIANC) from 1969 until 1985 and from 1970 to 1971 was the country's chief delegate to the Permanent Association of Roads Congresses. Harris was a vice-president of the Institution of Civil Engineers (ICE) from 1971 to 1974 and president from November 1974 to November 1975. He also updated the ICE's contract documentations (including the 5th edition of ICE Conditions of Contract published in June 1973) and its standard method of measurement.

== Later career ==
In 1973 Harris left the Department of the Environment and became a partner at Peter Fraenkel & Partners, a position he held for the next five years. From 1976 to 1979 Harris was chairman of the Construction Industry Manpower Board and from 1978 to 1987 was the chairman of the B&CE Holiday Management Company and Benefit Trust Company, a provider of benefits, holiday pay and pensions to the construction industry. Harris was the deputy chairman of the board of the Port of Dover for 1980 to 1982, having been a member of the board since 1959.

In 1977 he was elected a Fellow of the Royal Academy of Engineering, then named the Fellowship of Engineering. In 1984 he was elected president of the Smeatonian Society of Civil Engineers. In 1985 he received the Department of Defense Distinguished Civilian Service Award from the US Army Corps of Engineers in recognition of his work to secure an international agreement upon the disposal of dredged material. His wife, Margaret, died in 1991 and in 1992 he married Rachel Bishop. Harris died at East Carlton, Northamptonshire on 20 February 2005. PIANC, in conjunction with the ICE, holds an annual "Sir William Harris lecture" in his honour.

== Notes ==
Professional and academic associations
Preceded by Kirby Laing	President of the Institution of Civil Engineers; November 1974 – November 1975	Succeeded by Norman Rowntree
