= Ralph Freeman (civil engineer, born 1911) =

- Freeman in 1966
- Born: 3 February 1911
- Died: 24 August 1998 (aged 87)
- Education: Uppingham School
- Children: Elizabeth Corfe, Ralph Antony Freeman, Hugh Freeman
- Parent: Sir Ralph Freeman
- Engineering career
- Discipline: Civil
- Institutions: Institution of Civil Engineers (president),
- Projects: Forth Road Bridge, Severn Bridge, Humber Bridge

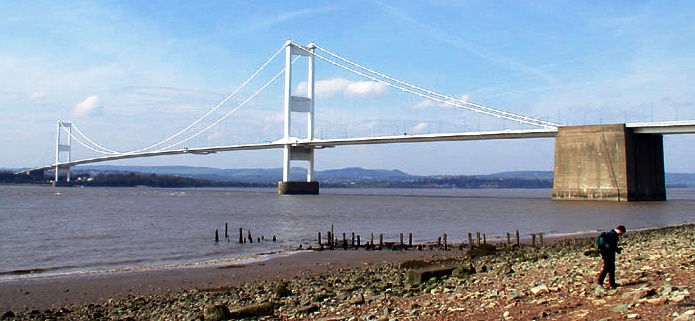
The Severn Bridge

Sir Ralph Freeman CVO CBE (3 February 1911 – 24 August 1998) was an English civil engineer, responsible for the design of the Humber Suspension Bridge - the longest in the world until 1998. He was the son of Sir Ralph Freeman, designer of the Sydney Harbour Bridge.

He was educated at Uppingham School, Rutland and Worcester College, Oxford. Sir Ralph worked on bridges in South Africa and Rhodesia, where he met his wife Joan Rose, before returning to England in 1939 and joining Freeman Fox & Partners, a firm of consulting engineers (called Douglas Fox & Partners before changing its name in 1938 in honour of Sir Ralph's father, a senior partner there).

Freeman served in the Royal Engineers during the Second World War as a Captain in the Experimental Bridging Establishment in Christchurch, Hampshire, England. He was involved in the development of a propped military suspension bridge. Freeman served in the volunteer Engineer and Railway Staff Corps, providing engineering expertise to the army, and was gazetted at the rank of Major in that corps on 6 October 1953.

He then returned to Freeman Fox & Partners, eventually retiring in 1979, having worked on a variety of large projects: the M2 and M5 motorways, the Forth Road Bridge, the Severn Bridge, both Bosporus bridges, and the harbour tunnel and mass transit rail systems in Hong Kong. He served as president of the Institution of Civil Engineers in 1966–7.

The pinnacle of his career was the Humber suspension bridge which, when it opened in 1981, was the longest single-span suspension bridge in the world, 1410m between its two 155m-high pylons.

His son, Ralph (but known as Anthony), who also took up civil engineering, died in July 1998 after an accident on the Vasco da Gama bridge in Lisbon.

Professional and academic associations
Preceded by James Arthur Banks	President of the Institution of Civil Engineers; November 1966 – November 1967	Succeeded by Hubert Shirley-Smith
