= Ralph Freeman (civil engineer, born 1880) =

English structural engineer (1880–1950)

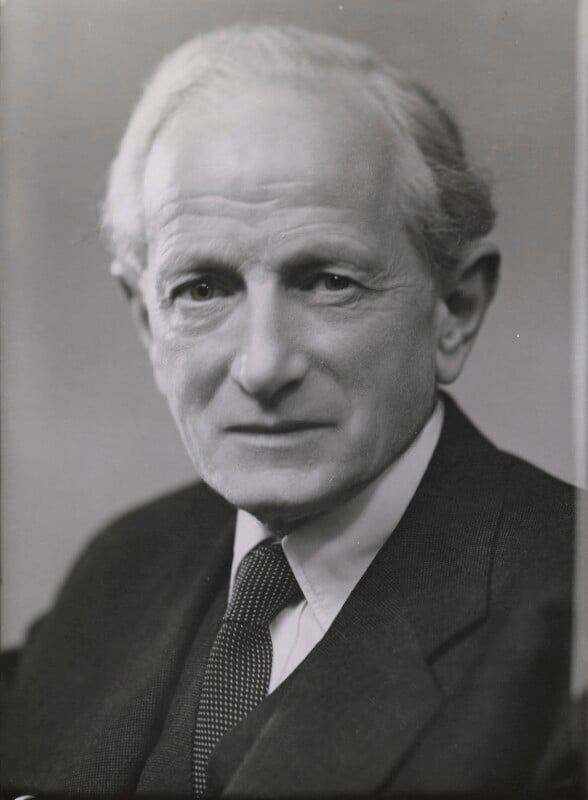
Freeman in 1949

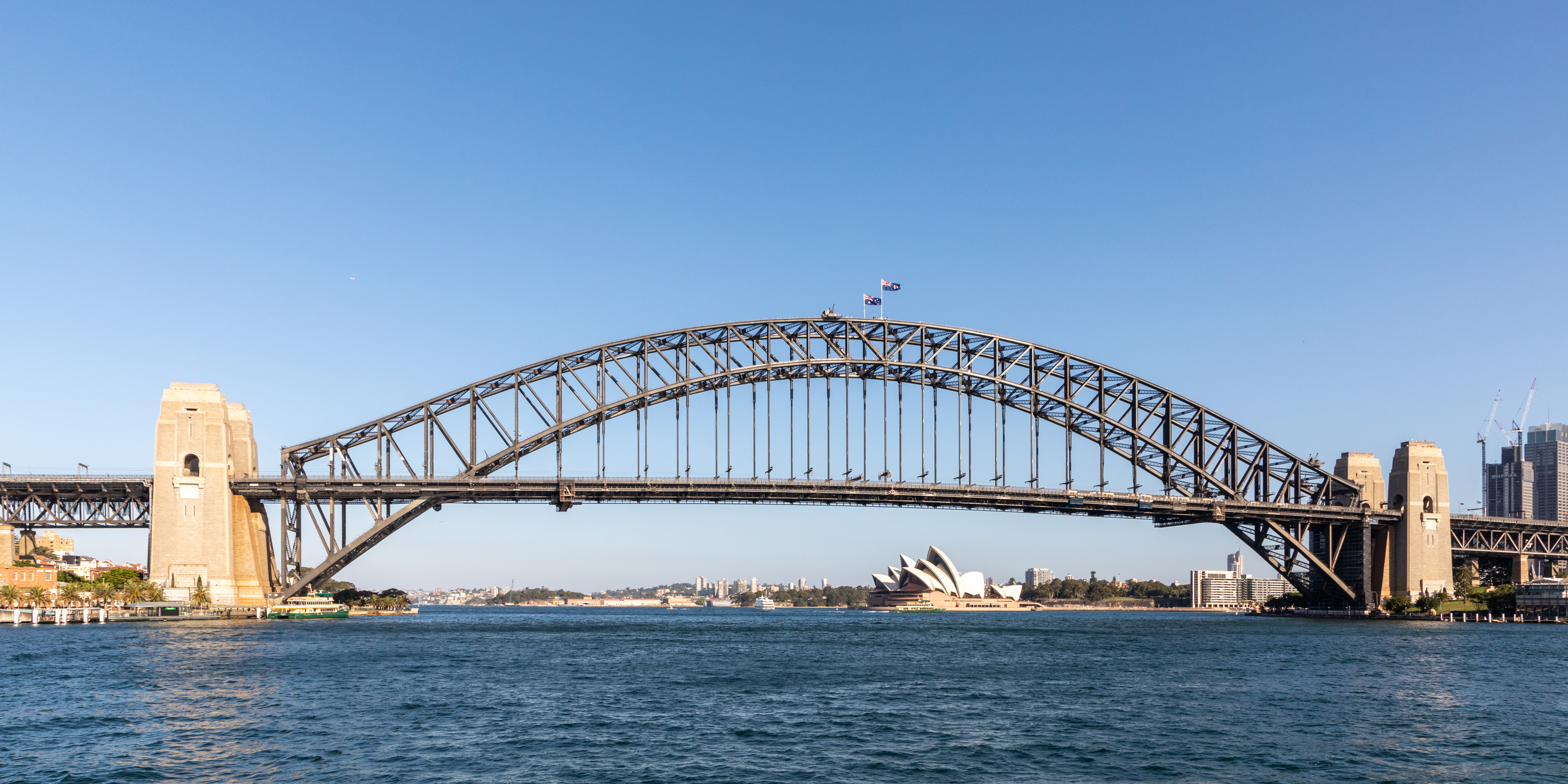
The Sydney Harbour Bridge in 2019

Sir Ralph Freeman (27 November 1880 – 11 March 1950) was an English structural engineer, responsible for the design of several of the world's most impressive bridges.

Born in London, England, he studied at The Haberdashers' Aske's Boys' School and the City and Guilds of London Institute, and in 1901 joined Douglas Fox & Partners, a firm of consulting engineers specialising in the design of steel bridges. He rose to become senior partner and in 1938 the firm changed its name to Freeman Fox & Partners.

Sir Ralph is best remembered for his design work on the Sydney Harbour Bridge and the Birchenough Bridge in the Chipinge area of Zimbabwe.

His son, also called Ralph Freeman, was also an engineer, senior partner at Freeman Fox & Partners, and president of the Institution of Civil Engineers. He had been responsible for the design of the Humber Suspension Bridge. His grandson, Ralph Anthony Freeman, was also an engineer who worked on numerous bridges including The RAMA IX Bridge in Bangkok.
