= Ian MacDonald Campbell =

British engineer

- Born: 13 July 1922
- Died: 1 April 1994 (aged 71)
- Education: University College London
- Spouse: Hilda Ann Williams (m. 1946)
- Parent: John Isdale Campbell
- Engineering career
- Discipline: Civil, British Railways
- Institutions: Institution of Civil Engineers (president)
- Awards: Commander of the Royal Victorian Order; Fellow of the Royal Academy of Engineering

Ian MacDonald Campbell, CVO (13 July 1922 – 1 April 1994) was a British civil engineer. He was chief executive of the British Railways Board (1978–1980) and chairman of the Scottish Board of British Railways (1983–1988).

== Early life, family and education ==
Ian MacDonald Campbell was born on 13 July 1922, the son of John Isdale Campbell. He attended University College London, graduating with a Bachelor of Science degree in engineering in 1942.

== Career ==
=== Railways ===
After graduating, Campbell was employed by the London, Midland and Scottish Railway, and then served in the Royal Air Force during the Second World War. On demobilisation, in 1947 Campbell began working for British Railways; he was employed in engineering design and construction. In 1952, he spent a year in the United States studying management technology. He co-wrote an account of his experience in the US which was published in the Institution of Civil Engineers's proceedings in 1954. After returning to the United Kingdom in 1953, he was appointed assistant district engineer, Sheffield; he was later promoted to be district engineer at Kings Cross, and then in 1963 assistant civil engineer for the Scottish Region.

In 1965, Campbell was appointed chief civil engineer for the Scottish Region of British Railways. He was appointed assistant general manager of the London Midland Region in 1968 and general manager of the Eastern Region in 1970, serving until 1973 when he became an executive director of British Rail. In 1977, he became a member of the British Railways Board (BRB) with responsibility for engineering and research, and was appointed chief executive in June 1978, taking over from David Bowick. He was replaced as CEO by Bob Reid in March 1980. Thereafter, he was vice-chairman of the board from March 1980 until January 1983. He then served as chairman of the Scottish Board from 1983 to 1988, and left the BRB in 1987.

=== Other appointments and honours ===
In addition to his career with British Rail, Campbell was a member of the European Economic Community's Economic and Social Committee between 1983 and 1990. He was also a member of the British Army's Territorial & Army Volunteer Reserve's Engineer and Railway Staff Corps, an unpaid, volunteer unit that provides technical expertise to the armed forces. With the serial number 485885, he was initially a major; his promotion to lieutenant colonel was gazetted on 3 May 1970, to colonel on 1 August 1974. and to be Colonel Commanding the Engineer and Railway Staff Corps on 21 July 1981. His supernumeracy to establishment was dated 30 April 1986 and Col. Christopher Terrel Wyatt took command of the corps.

He was also vice-president (1978–81) and then president (1981–82) of the Institution of Civil Engineers. Campbell was appointed an Officer (Brother) of the Order of St John of Jerusalem in 1973. He was also appointed a Commander of the Royal Victorian Order (CVO) in the 1977 Silver Jubilee and Birthday Honours. He was elected a fellow of the Royal Academy of Engineering (FREng) in 1980, and was also a fellow of the Institution of Civil Engineers (FICE) and the Chartered Institute of Transport (FCIT).

=== Later life ===
Campbell died on 1 April 1994. He was survived by his wife, Hilda Ann (née Williams), and their son and three daughters.

== Bibliography ==
- Watson, Garth (1988), The Civils, Thomas Telford Ltd, ISBN 0-7277-0392-7;
- Terence Richard (Terry) Gourvish, British Rail: 1974–97: From Integration to Privatisation, Oxford University Press, Oxford, 2002. ISBN 0-19-926909-2. (705 pages);

Professional and academic associations
Preceded by Peter Arthur Cox	President of the Institution of Civil Engineers; November 1981 – November 1982	Succeeded by John Vernon Bartlett
