= Barry Clark =

Barry Clark may refer to:

- Barry Clark (EastEnders), a character in the BBC TV series EastEnders
- Barry Clark (rally driver) (born 1982), British rally driver
- Barry Clark (tenor) (born 1950), tenor who has appeared with the D'Oyly Carte Opera Company and the Carl Rosa Opera Company
- Barry G. Clark (born 1938), American astronomer

== See also ==
- Barry Clarke (disambiguation)
