= Stuart Mustow =

British civil engineer (1928–2019)

Stuart Mustow CBE, FREng
- Born: 26 November 1928; Smethwick, Staffordshire, England
- Died: 2 June 2019 (aged 90)
- Occupation: Civil engineer
- Known for: President of the Institution of Civil Engineers

Stuart Norman Mustow CBE (26 November 1928 – 2 June 2019) was a British civil engineer. Mustow has a long association with municipal engineering, being county surveyor of the West Midlands from 1974 to 1986. He was involved in the development of the M5 and M6 motorways and in bringing the Birmingham Inner Ring Road under the control of his county (rather than the city authority). Mustow retired from municipal work in 1986 to enter private practice and was later a director at WS Atkins. Mustow was president of the Institution of Municipal Engineers and of the Institution of Civil Engineers and was a fellow of the Royal Academy of Engineering.

== Municipal engineering ==
Stuart Mustow was born on 26 November 1928 in Smethwick, Staffordshire. Mustow spent his early career in local government, during which time he supported the development of the M5 and M6 motorways, and was county surveyor for the West Midlands from 1974 to 1986. During his time in office it was discovered that defective cement had been used in bridge beams at St Chad's Circus and eight other locations on the Birmingham Inner Ring Road, much of this had been built by the same contractor; as a consequence, in July 1978 Mustow recommended that the responsibility for maintenance of the road be taken from Birmingham City Council and given to West Midlands County Council. This measure was approved by the Department of the Environment and was seen as a loss of face for the Birmingham Council. Mustow was president of the Institution of Municipal Engineers at some point prior to 1983.

== Later career ==
Mustow retired from local authority work in 1986 to become a consulting engineer. He also appeared on radio and television programmes and in Private Eye. Mustow is a fellow of the Royal Academy of Engineering and served as president of the Institution of Civil Engineers (ICE) between November 1993 and November 1994. During his presidency he made steps to secure greater recognition of the role of the civil engineer in society and made changes to the ICE's annual report such that it made reference to an annual survey of the attitudes of its members. Mustow was appointed a Commander of the Order of the British Empire in the 1995 New Year Honours for services to civil engineering, at which point he was a non-executive director of WS Atkins. Mustow ran the "S and S Mustow Trust" with his wife Sigrid between 21 October 1970 and 15 February 2017. The charity made grants to educational, religious and poverty relief charities and individuals and was defined as a Protestant Christian organisation. He died in June 2019 following a short illness.

Professional and academic associations
| Preceded by Mike Cottell | President of the Institution of Civil Engineers; November 1993 – November 1994 | Succeeded by Edmund Hambly |
