= William Bald =

Scottish surveyor, cartographer and civil engineer

- Born: c. 1789; Burntisland, Fife, Scotland
- Died: 1857; London, England
- Engineering career
- Discipline: Civil; Mining; Cartography
- Institutions: Royal Society of Edinburgh; Royal Irish Academy; Geological Society of London; Institution of Civil Engineers; Societe de Geographie
- Projects: Map of Maritime County of Mayo; Antrim Coast Road; Clyde River improvements

William Bald FRSE MRIA FGS MWS (c. 1789 – March 1857) was a Scottish surveyor, cartographer and civil engineer.

Bald was the cousin of Robert Bald, surveyor and mining engineer.

== His life ==
William Bald was born in Burntisland, Fife in 1789. He left school in Burntisland at the age of 12 and, after a brief period of schooling in Edinburgh, was apprenticed to John Ainslie in 1803. This was an impressive start to his working life, as Ainslie was the leading Scottish map-maker of his generation.

Around this time, there was a strong demand for map-making services from Scottish landowners, who were keen to develop their estates and thereby increase their profitability. It was on such projects that Bald, supervised by Ainslie, initially worked. Within two years Bald, at age 17, was given personal responsibility for mapping the Western Isles of Scotland. The maps which he produced were a major factor in transforming the way in which the Western Isles were depicted in the new atlases of the day.

Bald moved to Ireland by 1809, and at the age of 21 was embarking on his most significant period of work. In 1815, he was describing himself as a Land Surveyor, and was living in Castlebar, County Mayo. It was in Ireland that his principal mapping, surveying and civil engineering works such as roads and canals were undertaken, and it is in Ireland that he is chiefly remembered today. He was responsible for the construction and improvement of roads, harbours and railways throughout Ireland. As Director of the Trigonometrical Survey of County Mayo he produced a 25-sheet map of the county, completed in 1830, which is regarded as a masterpiece.

From 1826 to 1830, Bald worked in France, before returning to Ireland. Among his many projects there were improvements to the River Boyne and the harbour at Drogheda. He was also responsible for Ireland's first suspension bridge, at Kenmare in County Kerry.

But his most famous work is the Antrim Coast Road, which is regarded as one of Ireland's most scenic drives. He built the 40 km route from Larne to Cushendall between 1832 and 1842. Bald had the vision of building the road along the foot of the cliffs, some of them over 100 metres high. This was a novel idea, as previous plans had been to build the road some distance inland. But this would have meant steep gradients as the road traversed the valleys of the Glens as they ran down from the Antrim Plateau to the sea. Bald decided to blast the cliff face which then fell down onto the foreshore to form the base for the new road.

In 1834 Bald had the idea of opening up a limestone quarry on the Cavehill, near Belfast, and transporting the stone down to Belfast Harbour by a railway. He estimated the work to cost £12,000, but thought it would deliver an annual income of around £2,300. The Cavehill Railway and Quarries company was formed and Bald constructed a double track tram road of 4' 9" gauge, operated by horse and gravity. The track crossed the Ballysillan Road under a twin arched bridge, crossed over the Antrim Road and ran down to the port by way of the Limestone Road. The company continued to trade until 1896 when it became bankrupt.

In 1839 Bald was appointed as engineer to the Clyde River Trust in Scotland, where he was involved in the deepening and improving of the river, as well as redesigning Troon harbour. After being dismissed after differences of opinion after six years, he returned to work in France, while acting as at consultant engineer to the Admiralty.

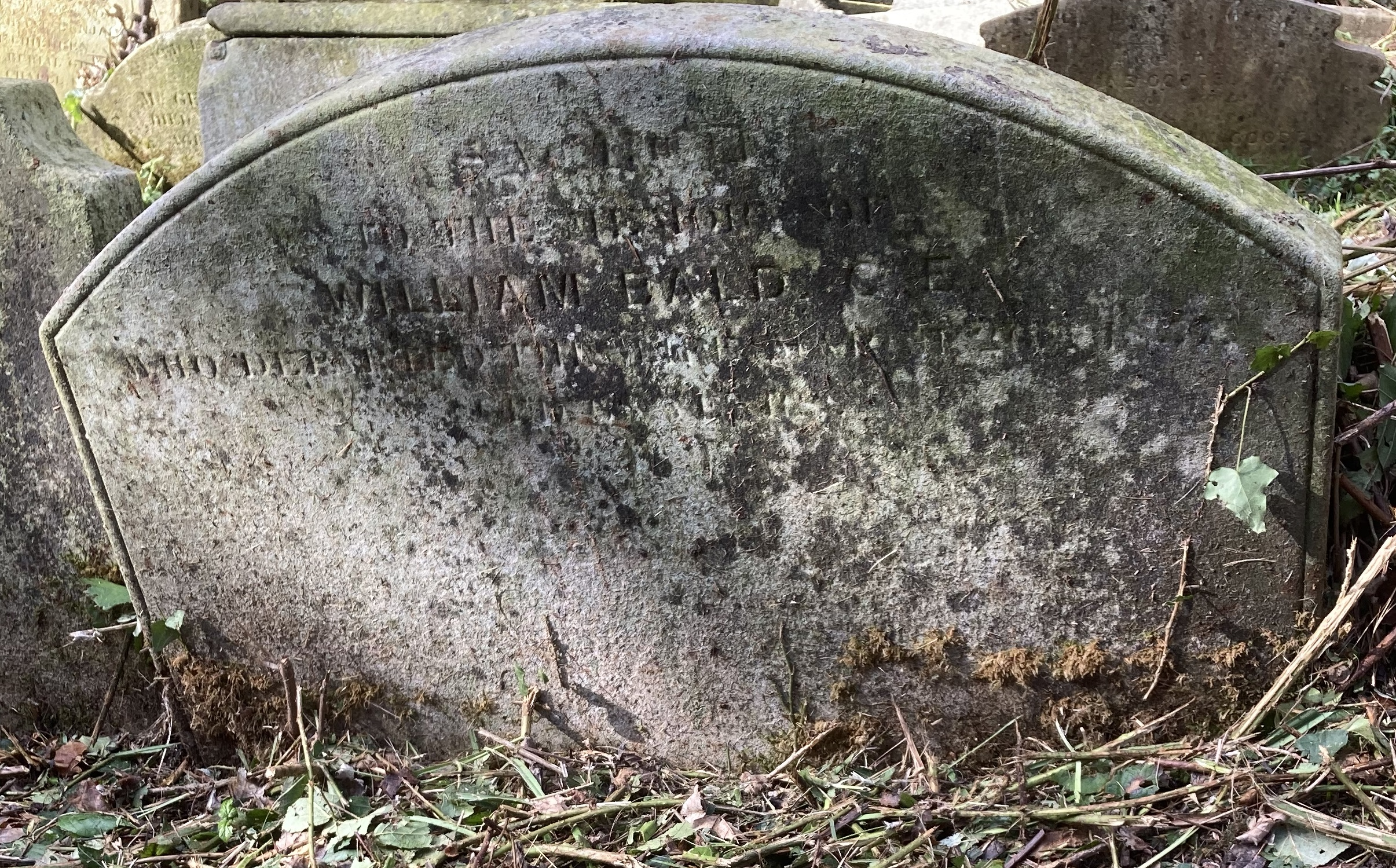
Grave of William Bald in Highgate Cemetery

Bald was an innovative and imaginative civil engineer, whose work was highly regarded in the various countries in which he worked. He was a Member of the Institution of Civil Engineers and the Royal Society of Edinburgh. In 1816, Bald was elected as a Fellow of the Geological Society of London, and he became a Member of the Royal Irish Academy in 1822. In 1829 he was proposed for membership of the Royal Society of Scotland by his cousin Robert Bald. After a stay in Paris he was elected as a Member of the Societe de Geographie, in Paris in 1828.

William Bald married his first wife, Anne, in 1809 in Scotland, and in 1823 he married his second wife, Matilda Barrett, in Ballina. He is thought to have fathered 13 children. William died in 1857 and is buried on the western side of Highgate Cemetery.

David Orr, the President of the Institution of Civil Engineers in 2007–08, praised Bald as an "unsung hero" in his Presidential Address of November 2007. Speaking of the Antrim Coast Road, Orr said that Bald had left "an immeasurable legacy to the people of the Glens of Antrim, and created one of the finest tourist routes in the world".

In November 2009, the Institution of Civil Engineers in Northern Ireland launched the 'William Bald Scholarships', with the backing of the Northern Ireland Executive and local civil engineering contractors. These scholarships recognise post graduate work of the next generation of civil engineers, and graduates will benefit each year for a period of five years.

== Bibliography ==
- A Biographical Dictionary of Civil Engineers in Great Britain and Ireland. A. W. Skempton
- William Bald, F. R. S. E., c. 1789–1857; Surveyor, Cartographer and Civil Engineer. Margaret C. Storrie. Transactions of the Institute of British Geographers, No. 47 (Sep. 1969), pp. 205–231
