= List of presidents of the Institution of Civil Engineers =

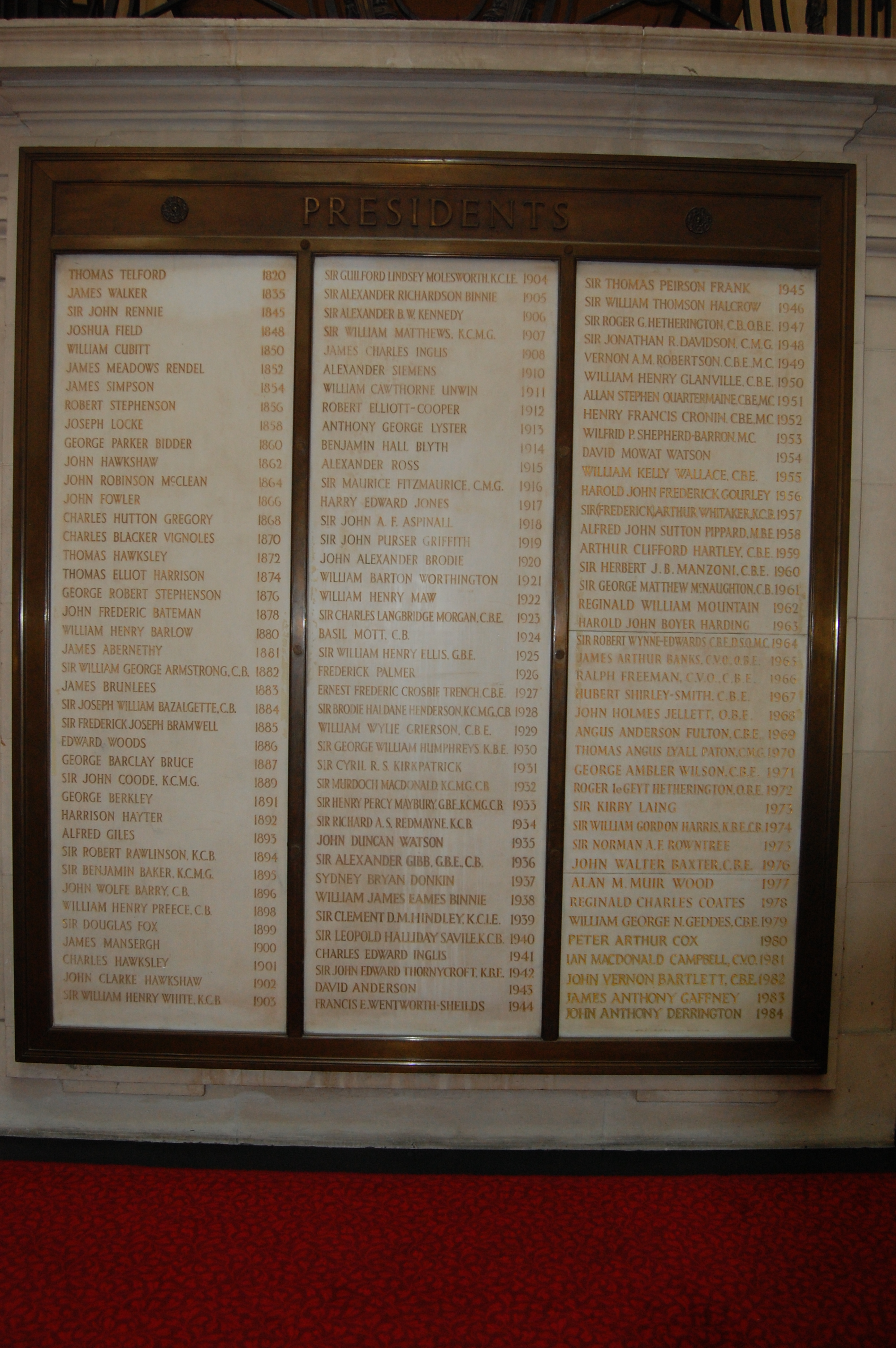
Plaque listing the early presidents, on the main staircase at the Institution's headquarters, One Great George Street

This is a list of presidents of the Institution of Civil Engineers (ICE). The president's role is to represent the institution and to promote the profession to the public. The first president was Thomas Telford who had the office bestowed upon him for life in recognition of his contributions to the civil engineering profession. It became a biennial office with the election of Sir William Cubitt in 1849 and an annual office with the election of Sir George Berkley in 1891, which it has remained since.

On 18 December 1956, Harold Gourley died just six weeks after assuming the office in November. Gourley was the first regularly elected president to die in office (Telford, who was elected president for life, died in office) and the ICE council, who were authorised to fill any vacancy except that of President, were forced to call a Special General Meeting of members. As a result of this meeting, Sir Frederick Arthur Whitaker was elected to the position in February 1957 and was allowed to serve out the remainder of Gourley's term in addition to his own full term. Subsequent deaths in office saw Sir Herbert Manzoni succeed Arthur Hartley in February 1960; and Tony Ridley succeed Edmund Hambly in March 1995.

Current practice is for candidates to be nominated by the ICE Presidential Selection Panel. The candidate will then serve as one of several vice-presidents of the institution, becoming senior vice-president in the session preceding their term as president. The candidate is formally elected as president by the ICE council in the January of their senior vice-presidential term. The new president takes office at the start of the ICE session in November, the opening meeting being an address from the incoming president.

The first female president, Jean Venables, was elected in 2008, the second, Rachel Skinner, in 2020 and the third, Anusha Shah, in 2023.

No.	Image	Name	Took office	Left office	Ref
1		Thomas Telford	March 1820	September 1834	
2		James Walker	January 1835	January 1845	
3		Sir John Rennie	January 1845	January 1848	
4		Joshua Field	January 1848	December 1849	
5		Sir William Cubitt	December 1849	December 1851	
6		James Meadows Rendel	December 1851	December 1853	
7		James Simpson	December 1853	December 1855	
8		Robert Stephenson	December 1855	December 1857	
9		Joseph Locke	December 1857	December 1859	
10		George Parker Bidder	December 1859	December 1861	
11		Sir John Hawkshaw	December 1861	December 1863	
12		John Robinson McClean	December 1863	December 1865	
13		Sir John Fowler	December 1865	December 1867	
14		Sir Charles Hutton Gregory	December 1867	December 1869	
15		Charles Blacker Vignoles	December 1869	December 1871	
16		Thomas Hawksley	December 1871	December 1873	
17		Thomas Elliott Harrison	December 1873	December 1875	
18		George Robert Stephenson	December 1875	December 1877	
19		John Frederic La Trobe Bateman	December 1877	December 1879	
20		William Henry Barlow	December 1879	December 1880	
21		James Abernethy	December 1880	December 1881	
22		Lord Armstrong	December 1881	December 1882	
23		Sir James Brunlees	December 1882	December 1883	
24		Sir Joseph Bazalgette	December 1883	December 1884	
25		Sir Frederick Bramwell	December 1884	May 1886	
26		Edward Woods	May 1886	June 1887	
27		Sir George Barclay Bruce	June 1887	May 1889	
28		Sir John Coode	May 1889	May 1891	
29		Sir George Berkley	May 1891	May 1892	
30		Harrison Hayter	May 1892	May 1893	
31		Alfred Giles	May 1893	May 1894	
32		Sir Robert Rawlinson	May 1894	May 1895	
33		Sir Benjamin Baker	May 1895	June 1896	
34		Sir John Wolfe-Barry	June 1896	April 1898	
35		Sir William Henry Preece	April 1898	November 1899	
36		Sir Douglas Fox	November 1899	November 1900	
37		James Mansergh	November 1900	November 1901	
38		Charles Hawksley	November 1901	November 1902	
39		John Clarke Hawkshaw	November 1902	November 1903	
40		Sir William Henry White	November 1903	November 1904	
41		Sir Guilford Lindsey Molesworth	November 1904	November 1905	
42		Sir Alexander Binnie	November 1905	November 1906	
43		Sir Alexander Kennedy	November 1906	November 1907	
44		Sir William Matthews	November 1907	November 1908	
45		Sir James Charles Inglis	November 1908	November 1910	
46		Sir Alexander Siemens	November 1910	November 1911	
47		William Unwin	November 1911	November 1912	
48		Sir Robert Elliott-Cooper	November 1912	November 1913	
49		Anthony George Lyster	November 1913	November 1914	
50		Benjamin Hall Blyth	November 1914	November 1915	
51		Alexander Ross	November 1915	November 1916	
52		Sir Maurice Fitzmaurice	November 1916	November 1917	
53		Harry Edward Jones	November 1917	November 1918	
54		Sir John Aspinall	November 1918	November 1919	
55		Sir John Griffith	November 1919	November 1920	
56		John Alexander Brodie	November 1920	November 1921	
57		William Barton Worthington	November 1921	November 1922	
58		William Maw	November 1922	November 1923	
59		Sir Charles Langbridge Morgan	November 1923	November 1924	
60		Sir Basil Mott	November 1924	November 1925	
61		Sir William Henry Ellis	November 1925	November 1926	
62		Sir Frederick Palmer	November 1926	November 1927	
63		Ernest Crosbie Trench	November 1927	November 1928	
64		Sir Brodie Henderson	November 1928	November 1929	
65		William Grierson	November 1929	November 1930	
66		Sir George William Humphreys	November 1930	November 1931	
67		Sir Cyril Kirkpatrick	November 1931	November 1932	
68		Sir Murdoch MacDonald	November 1932	November 1933	
69		Sir Henry Maybury	November 1933	November 1934	
70		Sir Richard Redmayne	November 1934	November 1935	
71		John Duncan Watson	November 1935	November 1936	
72		Brigadier-General Sir Alexander Gibb	November 1936	November 1937	
73		Sydney Donkin	November 1937	November 1938	
74		William James Eames Binnie	November 1938	November 1939	
75		Sir Clement Hindley	November 1939	November 1940	
76		Sir Leopold Halliday Savile	November 1940	November 1941	
77		Sir Charles Inglis	November 1941	November 1942	
78		Sir John Edward Thornycroft	November 1942	November 1943	
79		Sir David Anderson	November 1943	November 1944	
80		Francis Wentworth-Shields	November 1944	November 1945	
81		Sir Thomas Peirson Frank	November 1945	November 1946	
82		Sir William Halcrow	November 1946	November 1947	(Note: The election of Asa Binns by Council to serve as president from November 1946 was announced on 4 June that year, but Binns died on 2 July so never took up the office.)
83		Sir Roger Gaskell Hetherington	November 1947	November 1948	
84		Sir Jonathan Davidson	November 1948	November 1949	
85		Vernon Robertson	November 1949	November 1950	
86		Sir William Glanville	November 1950	November 1951	
87		Sir Allan Stephen Quartermaine	November 1951	November 1952	
88		Henry Cronin	November 1952	November 1953	
89		Wilfred Shepherd-Barron	November 1953	November 1954	
90		David Mowat Watson	November 1954	November 1955	
91		William Kelly Wallace	November 1955	November 1956	
92		Harold Gourley	November 1956	January 1957	
93		Sir Frederick Arthur Whitaker	January 1957	November 1958	
94		Alfred Pippard	November 1958	November 1959	
95		Arthur Hartley	November 1959	February 1960	
96		Sir Herbert Manzoni	February 1960	November 1961	
97		Sir George Matthew McNaughton	November 1961	November 1962	
98		Reginald William Mountain	November 1962	November 1963	
99		Sir Harold Harding	November 1963	November 1964	
100		Sir Robert Wynne-Edwards	November 1964	November 1965	
101		James Arthur Banks	November 1965	November 1966	
102		Sir Ralph Freeman	November 1966	November 1967	
103		Sir Hubert Shirley-Smith	November 1967	November 1968	
104		John Holmes Jellett	November 1968	November 1969	
105		Angus Fulton	November 1969	November 1970	
106		Sir Angus Paton	November 1970	November 1971	
107		George Ambler Wilson	November 1971	November 1972	
108		Roger Le Geyt Hetherington	November 1972	November 1973	
109		Sir Kirby Laing	November 1973	November 1974	
110		Sir William Gordon Harris	November 1974	November 1975	
111		Sir Norman Rowntree	November 1975	November 1976	
112		John Walter Baxter	November 1976	November 1977	
113		Sir Alan Muir Wood	November 1977	November 1978	
114		Reginald Coates	November 1978	November 1979	
115		William George Nicholson Geddes	November 1979	November 1980	
116		Peter Arthur Cox	November 1980	November 1981	
117		Ian MacDonald Campbell	November 1981	November 1982	
118		John Vernon Bartlett	November 1982	November 1983	
119		James Anthony Gaffney	November 1983	November 1984	
120		John Anthony Derrington	November 1984	November 1985	
121		Donald Reeve	November 1985	November 1986	
122		David Gwilym Morris Roberts	November 1986	November 1987	
123		Sir William Francis	November 1987	November 1988	
124		Alastair Craig Paterson	November 1988	November 1989	
125		Peter Frank Stott	November 1989	November 1990	
126		Roy Thomas Severn	November 1990	November 1991	
127		Robin Lee Wilson	November 1991	November 1992	
128		Michael Norman Tizard Cottell	November 1992	November 1993	
129		Stuart Mustow	November 1993	November 1994	
130		Edmund Hambly	November 1994	March 1995	
131		Tony Ridley	March 1995	November 1996	
132		David Green	November 1996	November 1997	
133		Alan Cockshaw	November 1997	November 1998	
134		Roger Norman Sainsbury	November 1998	November 1999	
135		George Fleming	November 1999	November 2000	
136		Sir Joseph Dwyer	November 2000	November 2001	
137		Mark Whitby	November 2001	November 2002	
138		Adrian Long	November 2002	November 2003	
139		Douglas Oakervee	November 2003	November 2004	
140		Colin Clinton	November 2004	November 2005	
141		Gordon Grier Thomson Masterton	November 2005	November 2006	
142		Quentin John Leiper	November 2006	November 2007	
143		David Malcolm Orr	November 2007	November 2008	
144		Jean Venables	November 2008	November 2009	
145		Paul William Jowitt	November 2009	November 2010	
146		Peter Hansford	November 2010	November 2011	
147		Richard Coackley	November 2011	November 2012	
148		Barry Clarke	November 2012	November 2013	
149		Geoff French	November 2013	November 2014	
150		David Balmforth	November 2014	November 2015	
151		Sir John Armitt	November 2015	November 2016	
152		Tim Broyd	November 2016	November 2017	
153		Robert Mair, Baron Mair	November 2017	November 2018	
154		Andrew Wyllie	November 2018	November 2019	
155		Paul Sheffield (Note: Andrew Wolstenholme was originally selected as president for the 2019-2020 session and was appointed vice-president in anticipation of this. However, he resigned in April 2018, having been appointed a managing director at BAE Systems which he considered would leave him too little time to fulfil his role at the ICE. The ICE Council selected Paul Sheffield in his stead.)	November 2019	November 2020	
156		Rachel Skinner	November 2020	November 2021	
157		Ed McCann	November 2021	November 2022	
158		Keith Howells	November 2022	November 2023	
159		Anusha Shah	November 2023	November 2024	
160		Jim Hall	November 2024	November 2025	
161		David Porter	November 2025	November 2026	
162		Julie Wood	November 2026	Incumbent	

== See also ==
- Institution of Civil Engineers
