= Barry Clarke (engineer) =

British civil engineer

- Education: Newcastle University
- Spouse: Sandra Clarke
- Engineering career
- Discipline: Civil
- Institutions: Institution of Civil Engineers

Professor Barry Clarke is a British civil engineer. He specialises in geotechnical engineering and is Associate Director of the Institute of Resilient Infrastructure at Leeds University. Clarke has also worked at Cambridge University and at Newcastle University, where he obtained his first degree. He is a prolific writer with more than a hundred research papers and reports to his name and has written a textbook on pressuremeters in engineering applications. Clarke has sat on many construction industry committees and bodies, particularly those associated with engineering education.

== Early life ==
Clarke grew up in the North East of England and studied civil engineering at Newcastle University. During his time there he attended a lecture given by leading civil engineer Ove Arup and was greatly impressed by him. After graduation he joined the Voluntary Services Overseas programme and spent two years based at Montserrat.

== Academic career ==
Clarke worked briefly for a site investigation company upon his return to the UK in 1973 but left to research soil mechanics at Cambridge University. He moved away from full time research in 1984 to launch his geotechnical investigation firm, PM Insitu Techniques, leaving Cambridge the same year to return to Newcastle University as a lecturer. He was promoted to senior lecturer in 1992 and became Professor of Geotechnical Engineering and Head of Civil Engineering in 1998. Clarke became Dean of Business Development for science and engineering in 2003. Since 2008 he has worked at Leeds University, where he is Associate Director of the Institute of Resilient Infrastructure, and lives in nearby Harrogate with his wife, Sandra. He has also acted as an expert witness and advisor to construction companies, particularly in regards to geotechnical matters. Clarke has published over a hundred research papers and reports and is the author of the textbook Pressuremeters in Geotechnical Design.

== Professional associations ==
Clarke joined the British Geotechnical Society in 1989, an organisation he would chair (in its new form as the British Geotechnical Association) in 2001, and started the Northern Geotechnical Group of the Institution of Civil Engineers (ICE) in 1992. He joined the Northumbria branch of the ICE in 1995, being elected chairman in 1998. In 2000 Clarke became a member of the construction industry's Joint Board of Moderators and has also chaired their further learning committee. He became chairman of ICE North and the ICE Ground Forum in 2002 and in 2003 set up the Construction Industry Council's North East branch. Clarke remains interested in the development of engineering education and is Member for Lifelong Learning of the Construction Industry Council Executive and also represents higher education on the board of CITB ConstructionSkills, the industry skills council. He has served as president of the Engineering Professors' Council and is a member of the Engineering Strategic Advisory Team of the Engineering and Physical Sciences Research Council. Clarke was also a non executive director of the ICE's trading subsidiary, Thomas Telford Limited, from 2008 to 2012. He was elected president of the ICE and took office on 7 November 2012 for a one year term.

Professional and academic associations
Preceded by Richard Coackley	President of the Institution of Civil Engineers; November 2012 – November 2013	Succeeded by Geoff French
