= Black Country Development Corporation =

English urban development corporation

- Formation: 1987
- Dissolved: 1998
- Headquarters: Sandwell, Walsall
- Chair: Sir William Francis; George Carter
- Chief executive: David Morgan

The Black Country Development Corporation was an urban development corporation established in May 1987 to develop land in the Metropolitan Boroughs of Sandwell and Walsall in England.

== History ==
The corporation was established as part of an initiative by the future Deputy Prime Minister, Michael Heseltine, in May 1987 during the Second Thatcher ministry. Board members were directly appointed by the minister and overrode local authority planning controls to spend government money on infrastructure. This was a controversial measure in Labour strongholds such as East London, Merseyside and North East England.

Its flagship developments included the Black Country Spine Road, which connected access roads for derelict industrial sites near Bilston with junction 1 of the M5 motorway. During its lifetime 11,900,000 square feet (1,110,000 m^{2}) of non-housing development and 3,774 housing units were built. Around 21,440 new jobs were created and some £1,150m of private finance was leveraged in. Circa 988 acres (4.00 km^{2}) of derelict land was reclaimed and 24 miles (39 km) of new road and footpaths put in place.

The Black Country Spine Road was notable for providing the area around Wednesbury with a dual carriageway as well as reducing congestion on the narrower roads which surrounded it. The new road, which was opened in two phases in 1995, also freed up several square miles of previously inaccessible land which was soon developed for industrial and commercial use. The Chairman was Sir William Francis and, subsequently, George Carter and the Chief Executive was David Morgan. It was dissolved in 1998.
