= Peter Arthur Cox =

British civil engineer (1922–2018)

- Born: 30 October 1922; London, England, UK
- Died: 17 November 2018 (aged 96)
- Engineering career
- Discipline: Civil
- Institutions: Institution of Civil Engineers (president)

Peter Arthur Cox FREng (30 October 1922 – 17 November 2018) was a British civil engineer.

== Early life ==
He was born in London in October 1922 and held a Bachelor of Science degree in engineering.

== Military career ==
Cox served as a commissioned officer in the Royal Engineers during the Second World War, being promoted from cadet to lieutenant with 591st (Antrim) Parachute Squadron, Royal Engineers, on 15 August 1943. He was wounded on 17 January 1945 when a pile of mines exploded. He served at the crossing of the Rhine (Operation Varsity) on 24 March 1945 when his glider was the only one to arrive at the correct position at the bridges over the River Issel. He and his small party of Sappers were engaged in heavy fighting before the infantry captured the bridge and they could prepare it for demolition. Cox's party then moved to another bridge, which was under fire and he had to crawl out on his stomach, carrying one explosive charge at a time. The bridge was successfully destroyed before a German armoured counter-attack reached it. Cox was Mentioned in dispatches for his exploits. His war emergency commission was confirmed on 17 November 1948 with seniority of 30 October 1945. He continued in the Territorial Army after the war, and reached the rank of Colonel in 1981.

== Engineering career ==
Cox ended his career as the last senior partner of Rendel, Palmer and Tritton, the consulting firm which under his leadership designed the Thames Barrier. The firm had been founded in 1838 by James Meadows Rendel and was re-established as Rendel Ltd within the Ingérop group (fr) in 2015. He was also a fellow of the City and Guilds of London Institute. He was elected president of the Institution of Civil Engineers for the November 1980-1 session and was president of the Smeatonian Society of Civil Engineers for 1999.

Professional and academic associations
Preceded by William George Nicholson Geddes	President of the Institution of Civil Engineers; November 1980 – November 1981	Succeeded by Ian McDonald Campbell
