= George Ambler Wilson =

British civil engineer (1906–1977)

George Ambler Wilson CBE MICE
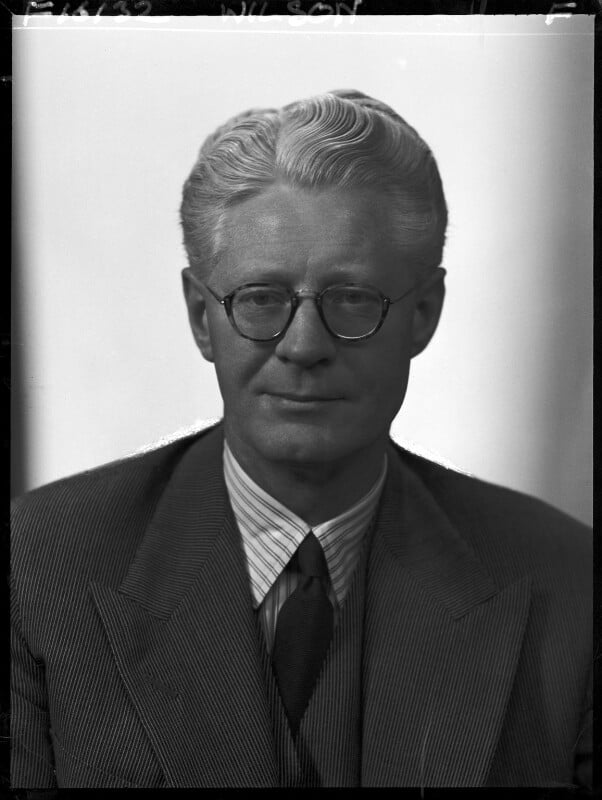
- Wilson in 1953
- Born: 1906; Wellington, Shropshire
- Died: 1977 (aged 70–71)
- Engineering career
- Discipline: Civil
- Institutions: Institution of Civil Engineers (president), Smeatonian Society of Civil Engineers (member)

George Ambler Wilson CBE MICE (1906–1977) was a British civil engineer.

Wilson was born in Wellington, Shropshire in 1906. He was the chief engineer of the Port of London Authority from 1953 to 1967. In 1958 he was elected a member of the Smeatonian Society of Civil Engineers. He also served as president of the Institution of Civil Engineers from November 1971 to November 1972. He died in 1977 and the National Portrait Gallery in London holds two images of him.

Wilson was honoured in the Queens 1967 birthday honours and appointed a CBE in the Civil Division.

== Family ==
Wilson has 4 daughters from two marriages.

In 1970, George's daughter Gail Wilson married her LSE colleague, Meghnad Desai, They had three children together.

Professional and academic associations
Preceded by Angus Paton	President of the Institution of Civil Engineers; November 1971 – November 1972	Succeeded by Roger Hetherington
