= Colin Clinton =

British civil engineer

- Born: 1956 or 1957; Walsall, Staffordshire
- Education: Aston University
- Engineering career
- Discipline: Civil
- Institutions: Institution of Civil Engineers (president)

Colin John Clinton is a British civil engineer who has worked as a director of the Arup Group engineering consultancy. He served as president of the Institution of Civil Engineers in 2004–05.

== Biography ==
Colin Clinton was born in Walsall, Staffordshire, in 1956 or 1957, and holds a bachelor of science degree from Aston University, Birmingham. He spent much of his career with Arup Group, the engineering consultancy and designer. By 1999, he was an associate of the firm and business manager of its Arup Transport division. He became a director by 2005, at which point he was living in Sutton Coldfield and commuting to the firm's Birmingham office. In an interview with The Times he commented on his frequent travel by train, noting that his day was ruined if he could not have a bacon butty and a cup of tea.

In July 2015, he was awarded an honorary doctor of engineering science degree by Aston University "in recognition of his work for the Institution of Civil Engineers (ICE) and his promotion of the industry". He is a chartered engineer, a fellow of the ICE, a fellow of the Chartered Institution of Civil Engineering Surveyors and a fellow of the Chartered Institution of Highways and Transportation.

== Institution of Civil Engineers ==
Clinton has a long association with the Institution of Civil Engineers. He was the ICE Midlands Association honorary secretary from 1989 to 1998 and was chairman by 1999. As chairman he arranged a collaboration with the Birmingham radio station Heart FM to promote the civil engineering profession. Heart representatives attended ICE meetings and dinners and civil engineers were interviewed on air. Heart considered that the collaboration would help increase its advertising revenue and attract listeners from the construction industry.

By 1999, Clinton was a member of the ICE's governing council and by 2004 was a vice-president. He served as president of the ICE for the November 2004 to November 2005 session, at that time the youngest person to have held the role. In December 2004 he worked with future ICE presidents Gordon Masterton and Quentin Leiper to update the ICE's core values. As president he changed the role to be more member-focused. He cut back the ICE events diary, removing historic engagements that clashed with his vision, and made sure the president was able to tour the country and meet members at companies and universities. Clinton held 100 "question time" sessions with workers and directors of engineering firms in 2005. He made around 15 visits abroad in 2005 and toured Africa for the ICE in February.

Clinton was an advocate of mergers between the professional institutions and advocated for a single Institute for the Built Environment to be established by a merger of the ICE, the Institution of Structural Engineers, the Royal Institute of British Architects and the Royal Institution of Chartered Surveyors. He was also a keen proponent of greater European integration as a means of addressing the skills shortage in the industry.

Professional and academic associations
Preceded by Douglas Oakervee	President of the Institution of Civil Engineers; November 2004 – November 2005	Succeeded by Gordon Masterton
