= Edmund Hambly =

Edmund Cadbury Hambly
- Born: 28 September 1942; Seer Green, Beaconsfield
- Died: 28 March 1995 (aged 52)
- Education: Eton College and Trinity College, Cambridge
- Engineering career
- Discipline: Civil,
- Institutions: Institution of Civil Engineers (president), Offshore Engineering Society (chairman), Institution of Structural Engineers (fellow), Institution of Mechanical Engineers (fellow), Royal Academy of Engineering (fellow),

Dr Edmund Cadbury Hambly (28 September 1942 – 28 March 1995) was a British structural engineer.

Edmund Hambly was born in Seer Green, near Beaconsfield, Buckinghamshire in 1942. He went to Eton College prior to studying the engineering tripos at Cambridge University. He excelled there gaining a first class honours degree and claiming the prize in structural engineering. Staying at Cambridge as a fellow of Emmanuel College he completed his doctorate following work on soil deformation models. It was here that he met and married Elizabeth Gorham with whom he had three daughters and a son.

Hambly left academia to spend five years working with Ove Arup and Partners in the design of structures and Gifford and Partners in bridge building. He devised new models and work methods for the approximation of structural behaviour which he published in 1976 in his first book, Bridge Deck Behaviour. In 1974 he set up his own consultancy and worked from his home in Hertfordshire, writing more than 40 technical papers to supplement his income. One of his first contracts was to investigate the design of bridge foundations for the Building Research Establishment, publishing some of his findings in Bridge Foundations and Substructures in 1979. He was asked by the oil and gas extraction industries to advise upon offshore platforms damaged by wave fatigue and collisions.

His expertise in the industry was widely recognized and he was created a fellow of the Institution of Structural Engineers in 1982, of the Royal Academy of Engineering in 1984 and of the Institution of Mechanical Engineers in 1991. He also served as chairman of the Offshore Engineering Society between 1989 and 1990.

He worked as a visiting professor at Oxford University from 1989 to 1992 lecturing in structural analysis, he wrote his third book, Structural Analysis by Example (1994) to provide examples of calculations for students.

Hambly had a keen interest in the provision of better social housing and encouraging community spirit as well as a quaker upbringing, he united these beliefs in his service as a trustee to the Bournville Village Trust between 1979 and 1988.

He was created a fellow of the Institution of Civil Engineers in 1990 and was keen to use this to promote engineering to young people and society as a whole. He was elected vice-president in 1991 and President in 1994. He used his inaugural address to show the need to attract students into engineering degrees and to provide more sustainable solutions to engineering problems. However he died in London on 28 March 1995, just five months into his one-year presidency. A prize in his honour is awarded annually by the Institution of Civil Engineers for contributions to sustainability in the industry. He was posthumously awarded an honorary doctorate of science by Nottingham University in 1996.

Professional and academic associations
Preceded by Stuart Mustow	President of the Institution of Civil Engineers; November 1994 – March 1995	Succeeded by Tony Ridley
