= Tony Ridley =

British civil engineer and academic (1933–2026)

- Born: Anthony Melville Ridley; 10 November 1933; Castletown, Sunderland, England
- Died: March 2026 (aged 92)
- Education: Durham School and Newcastle University
- Occupations: Civil engineer, academic
- Engineering career
- Discipline: Civil engineering
- Institutions: Institution of Civil Engineers (president), Royal Academy of Engineering (fellow),

Anthony Melville Ridley CBE (10 November 1933 – March 2026) was a British civil engineer and academic who worked as a design and site engineer in both the US and UK before becoming Chief Research Officer of the Highways and Transport department of the Greater London Council, before then becoming Director-General of the Tyne & Wear Passenger Transport Executive in 1969, where he oversaw the development of plans for the Tyne & Wear Metro. In 1975, Anthony was appointed Managing Director of the Hong Kong Mass Transit Railway Corporation, before later becoming Chief Executive of the London Underground, but resigned following the King's Cross fire in 1987 and subsequent publication of the Fennell Report. Anthony was also a director of engineering consultancy Halcrow Fox and President of the Institution of Civil Engineers from March 1995 to November 1996.

== Early life and education ==
Tony Melville Ridley was born in Castletown, Sunderland on 10 November 1933. He attended Durham School before graduating with a bachelor of science degree from Newcastle University. Ridley's education has also been associated with universities in the United States including Northwestern University, Illinois; the University of California and Stanford University. He was awarded a doctor of philosophy degree for a dissertation on the evaluation of transport investment.

== Career ==
Ridley, a fellow of the Royal Academy of Engineering, worked in the United States as a foundations design engineer and in the field of soil mechanics. He was a site engineer for the construction of Bradwell nuclear power station (commissioned 1962) and a design engineer for the Nuclear Power Group of Knutsford. Ridley was later chief research officer for the highways and transport department of the Greater London Council before he was selected, in 1969, to become the director-general of the newly founded Tyne & Wear Passenger Transport Executive. At the time of his appointment the chairman of Newcastle City Council's traffic and transport committee stated "He is a very brainy backroom boy, well versed in the theory of transport. It will be interesting to see how he deals with the management of a very large transport undertaking as he has had no management experience whatever, or experience of financial control. We wish him well, however". When the idea of a Tyneside metro system was first presented to him in 1971, Ridley is famed for saying "You’ll never get away with it". But Ridley oversaw both the development of the metro plans, which linked decaying rail lines using city centre tunnels and a bridge over the River Tyne, and the successful bid for Government funding. Ridley remained in post as director general until 1975 when he was appointed managing director of the Hong Kong Mass Transit Railway Corporation.

He left Hong Kong in 1978 and during the 1980s was chief executive officer of London Underground, but resigned following the King's Cross fire in 1987 and subsequent publication of the Fennell Report. In the 1986 New Year Honours he was appointed a Commander of the Order of the British Empire. In 1987 Ridley won the Institution Prize of the Chartered Institution of Highways and Transportation. He was appointed a director of the Chartered Institute of Logistics & Transport in 1991, serving in that role until 1993 and for a later stint between 1999 and 2001. He was a director of Halcrow Fox consulting engineers between 1992 and 2004, of the Major Projects Association between 1995 and 2009 and of the RAC Foundation from 1995 to 2010. He was also Head of the Department of Civil and Environmental Engineering at Imperial College London in the late 1990s and still maintained an emeritus professorship in the department.

== Institution of Civil Engineers ==
Ridley served as president of the Institution of Civil Engineers (ICE) from March 1995 to November 1996. He was appointed to the presidency following the death in office of Edmund Hambly. Ridley served out the remainder of Hambly's term as well as the usual 12 months in office, becoming the first person to do so since Herbert Manzoni in 1961. In June 1995 he called an extraordinary meeting of the ICE Council at its One Great George Street headquarters to discuss the future of the loss-making New Civil Engineer magazine. The ICE, facing a £4 million overdraft from a renovation of the headquarters, and the slide of the magazine into unprofitability was considering selling the publishing arm. The council met in a closed session for the first time in its history, with the room being cleared of all observers and the secretariat leaving only the voting members. The sale of New Civil Engineer and the institution's specialist engineering magazines to Emap was agreed later that month – though the ICE retained control of its book and journal publications.

== Death ==
Ridley died in March 2026, at the age of 92. His death was reported on 29 April.

Professional and academic associations
Preceded by Edmund Hambly	President of the Institution of Civil Engineers; March 1995 – November 1996	Succeeded by David Green
