= Roger Hetherington =

British civil engineer (1908–1990)

- Born: 1908; London
- Died: 1990 (aged 81–82)
- Education: Highgate School
- Engineering career
- Discipline: Civil,
- Institutions: Institution of Civil Engineers (President), Smeatonian Society of Civil Engineers (member emeritus)

Roger Le Geyt Hetherington CBE (1908–1990) was a British civil engineer.

Hetherington was born in London on 20 December 1908, the eldest son of Sir Roger Gaskell Hetherington and his wife Honoria Ford. In 1921 Hetherington entered Highgate School. Hetherington held a Master of Arts degree and was commissioned as a Lieutenant in the Royal Engineers on 22 July 1940. His professional career as a consulting civil engineer was with Binnie and Partners. He was elected a first class member of the Smeatonian Society of Civil Engineers in 1960 and later became a member emeritus. He was asked to become the president of the Society in 1979 but declined on the grounds of poor health. Hetherington served as president of the Institution of Civil Engineers from November 1972 to November 1973. and was appointed CBE in the 1974 Birthday Honours. He married Katharine Elise Dawson in 1945 and had a single daughter.

Professional and academic associations
| Preceded by George Ambler Wilson | President of the Institution of Civil Engineers; November 1972 – November 1973 | Succeeded by Kirby Laing |
