= John Holmes Jellett =

British civil engineer (1905–1971)

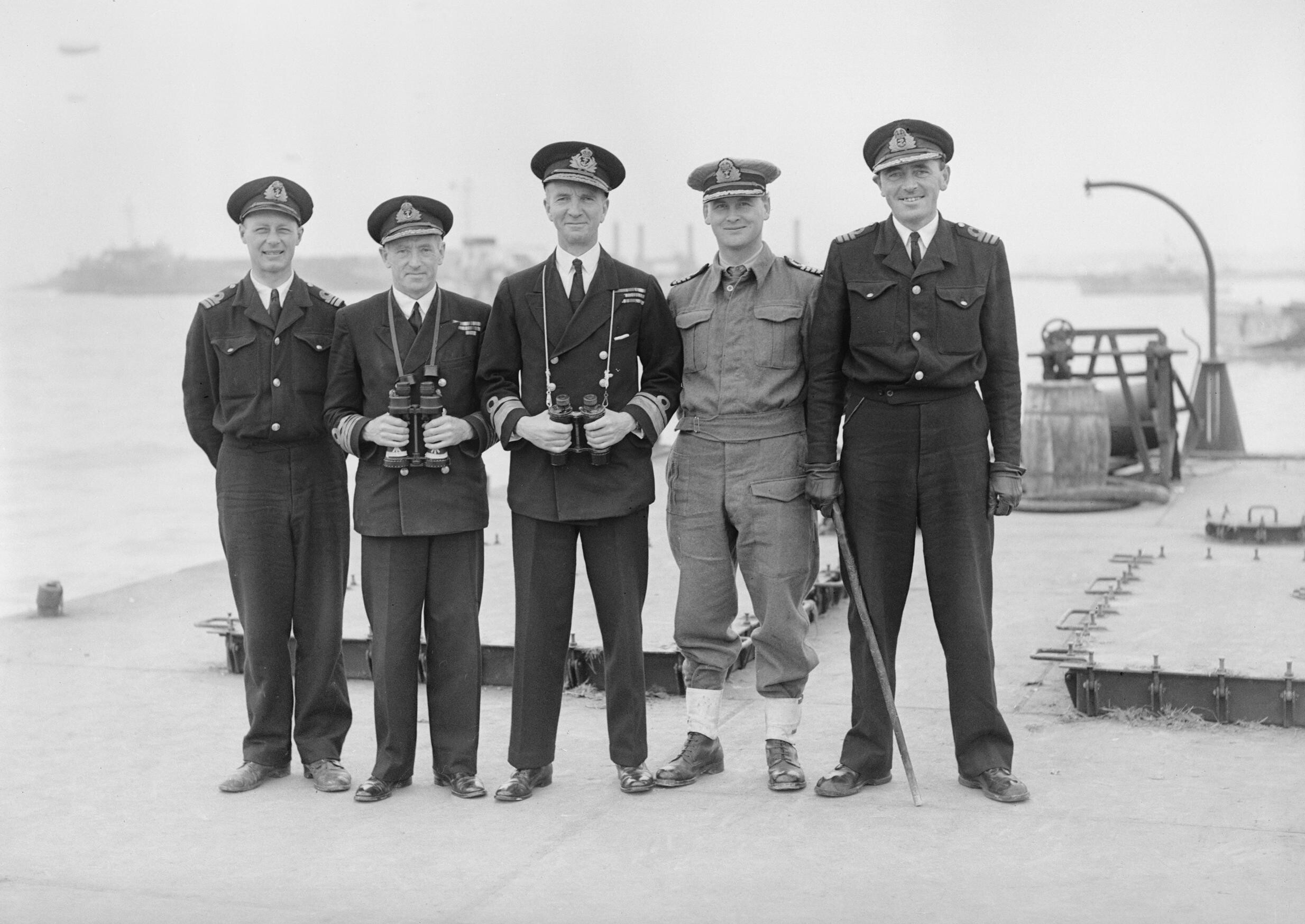
- Jellett (second from right) in 1944
- Born: 20 April 1905
- Died: 17 June 1971 (aged 66)
- Engineering career
- Discipline: Civil
- Institutions: Institution of Civil Engineers (president); Smeatonian Society of Civil Engineers (first class member)
- Projects: Mulberry Harbour

John Holmes Jellett Officer of the Order of the British Empire (OBE), DSc, MA (20 April 1905 – 17 June 1971) was a British civil engineer. Jellett started his career as a bridge and canal engineer before joining the Admiralty, where he specialised in docks. He made improvements to the Royal Navy dockyards and depots at Chatham, Singapore, Devonport, Gibraltar and Milford Haven in the 1930s. During the Second World War Jellett was responsible for works in Egypt and Malta as superintendent civil engineer for the Eastern Mediterranean. After service in the Mediterranean, he was superintending engineer for Mulberry Harbour B that supplied the allied forces in France after the Normandy Landings. Jellett was appointed an OBE for this work in late 1944. After the war he worked for the Southern Railway and then the British Transport Commission in Southampton Docks. Jellett served as president of the Institution of Civil Engineers in 1968–69.

== Early life and career ==
Jellett was born on 20 April 1905 in Darjeeling, India. He was educated at Shrewsbury School in England and graduated with a first class Bachelor of Arts degree in the mechanical sciences tripos, from the University of Cambridge in 1927.

Jellett joined the drawing office of Rendel, Palmer and Tritton and spent the next three years designing railway girder bridges for the Ministry of Transport, principally in India and the colonies. His designs included the Rewa Bridge in Fiji and the Dhaleswari Bridge in Eastern Bengal. He also completed a preliminary design for a crossing of the River Thames at Charing Cross. Jellett joined the firm of Robert Elliott-Cooper in 1932 to become assistant resident engineer for the construction of the Grand Union Canal in Warwickshire, including the construction of 52 new locks and widening and deepening the canal.

== Admiralty civil engineer ==
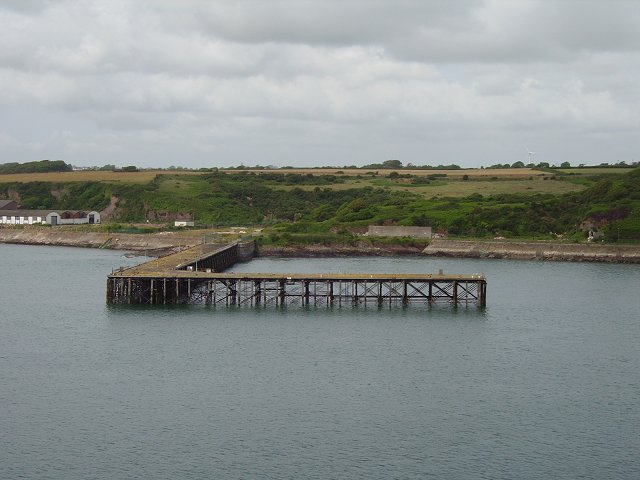
Remains of the Royal Navy Munitions Depot Milford Haven

Jellett was appointed assistant civil engineer to the Admiralty on 22 June 1933, with responsibility for maintenance of Chatham Dockyard. Jellett installed a new main drainage system and began reclaiming nearby marshland. In 1935, he transferred to the Singapore Naval Base as deputy to the divisional officer in charge of construction of a new armaments depot with associated stores and workshops, on a reclaimed mangrove swamp. Jellett was responsible for underground reinforced concrete magazines, sewerage, drainage, water supply, roads and a metre-gauge railway.

Jellett was promoted to civil engineer of the naval base in 1936 and to Civil Engineer to the Admiralty in 1938, working from Whitehall. He was involved in planning dredging operations, construction of Fleet Air Arm stations and widening dry docks in HMNB Devonport and Gibraltar. Jellett became officer-in-charge of the final part of the construction of the Naval mine depot at RNMD Milford Haven in 1939, which included workshops for the manufacture of explosives, safety moats and protective measures for fuel oil at the fuelling depots.

== Second World War ==
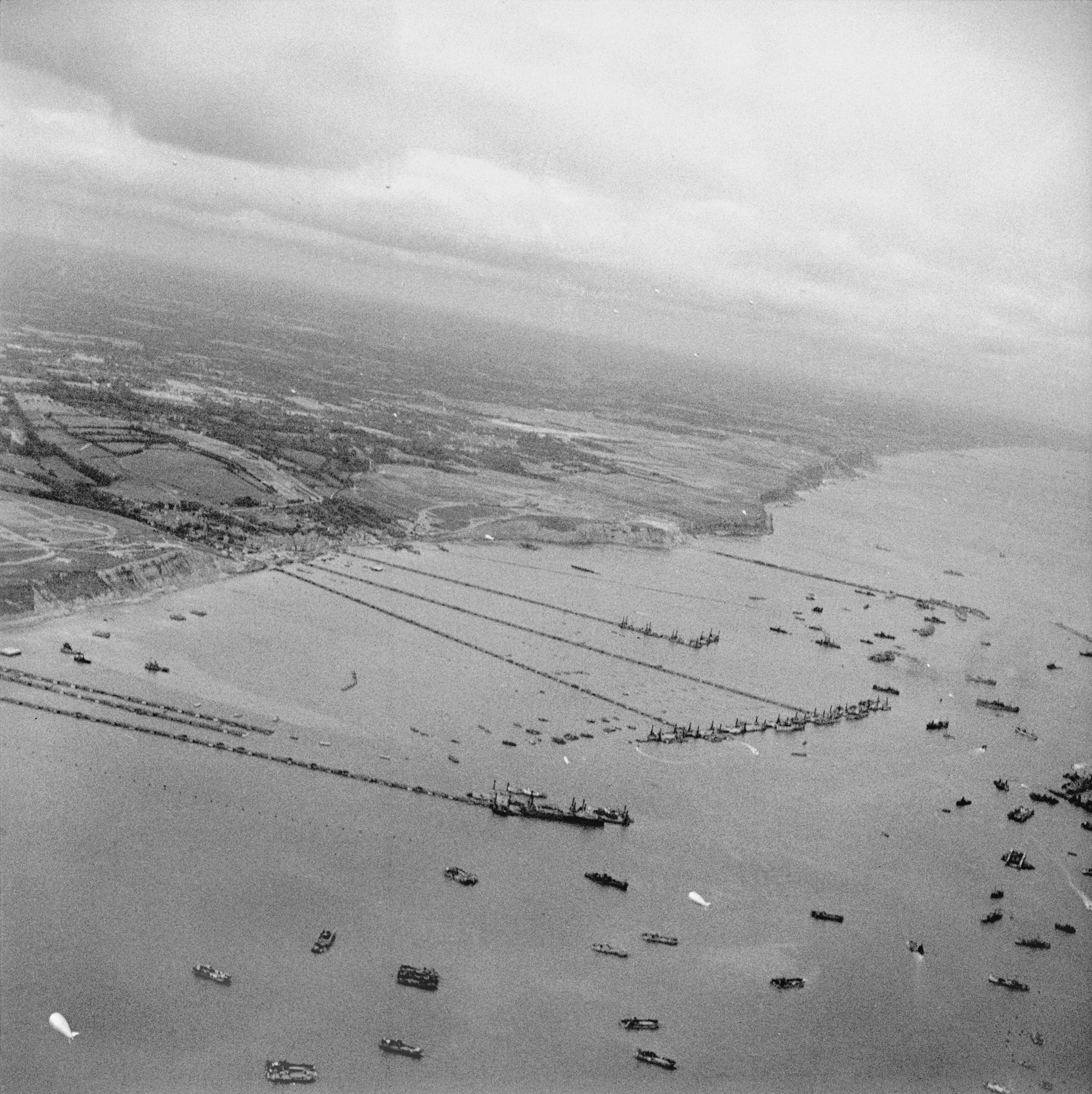
Mulberry Harbour B

Jellett was promoted to superintendent civil engineer in 1940, working from the temporary Admiralty offices in Bath, Somerset. He was responsible for motor torpedo boat bases, minefield control towers, sea forts, shipyard and naval armament factories. In 1942, he was superintendent civil engineer for the Eastern Mediterranean and carried out dredging and widening works on the Great Pass in Alexandria, renovating dry docks and constructing new slipways. He became superintendent for civil engineering works at the Malta Dockyard in 1943, where he carried out works to repair bomb damage from the two-year Siege of Malta.

Jellett was commissioned as a Temporary Captain in the Royal Navy Volunteer Reserve in 1944 and appointed superintending civil engineer of Mulberry Harbour B, a temporary concrete harbour built at Arromanches, France to support the Normandy Landings. He was responsible for siting the blockships and Phoenix breakwaters that protected the harbour. Mulberry B was in use for five months after the invasion and landed two million men, half a million vehicles and four million tons of supplies for the Liberation of Europe. Mulberry A, under control of American forces and more exposed to the weather, was wrecked by a storm in late June and abandoned, leaving Jellett's harbour as the main landing point for supplies to the allied forces in France. In recognition of Jellett's work with the Mulberry harbour he was appointed an Officer of the Order of the British Empire on 28 November 1944. The citation in the London Gazette referred to his "distinguished service in operations which led to the successful landing of allied forces in Normandy".

== Post-war work ==
From October 1945 to February 1946 Jellett was superintending civil engineer at Chatham and from 1946 to 1948 was deputy docks engineer for Southern Railway at Southampton Docks. After the Transport Act 1947 which nationalised the railways, he was promoted to docks engineer for the British Transport Commission at Southampton and to chief docks engineer in 1958, a position he held until his retirement in December 1965. His primary concerns at Southampton were with repairing war damage, reclaiming 450 acres of salt marsh and diverting the River Test. After retirement he entered private practice as a consulting engineer in conjunction with EWH Gifford & Partners in Southampton.

Jellett returned to the armed forces on 3 July 1957 when he was appointed a major in the Engineer and Railway Staff Corps, a part-time volunteer unit of the Territorial Army that offered advice to the British Army on engineering matters. In 1966 he was elected a first class engineer member of the Smeatonian Society of Civil Engineers. Jellett served as President of the Institution of Civil Engineers from November 1968 to November 1969. He had been a member of the institution since 1932 and a member of its council since 1956. Jellett was the third former chief engineer of Southampton Docks to become president, after Alfred Giles and Francis Wentworth-Shields and was unusually young to be selected as president in that era.

Jellett was awarded an honorary doctorate of science degree by Southampton University in July 1968. He authored the Harbours and Sea Works article entry in Encyclopædia Britannica. Jellett lived in Southampton in Hampshire, from 1946 until his death on 17 June 1971. He was married with two sons.

Professional and academic associations
Preceded by Hubert Shirley-Smith	President of the Institution of Civil Engineers; November 1968 – November 1969	Succeeded by Angus Fulton
