= Rachel Skinner =

British civil engineer

Rachel Skinner CBE FREng FICE
- Born: Rachel Susan Bass; December 1976 (age 49)
- Education: Durham University (BSc); University of Leeds (MSc(Eng))
- Children: 3
- Engineering career
- Discipline: Civil Engineering
- Institutions: Institution of Civil Engineers
- Awards: Most distinguished winner of 2017 & best woman civil engineer 2017 at the European Women in Construction and Engineering Awards. Top 50 Women in Engineering, 2016

Rachel Susan Skinner (née Bass; born December 1976) is a British civil engineer with Canadian-based consultant WSP Global. She was named one of the Daily Telegraph Top 50 Influential Women in Engineering in 2016 and both the Best Woman Civil Engineer and the Most Distinguished Winner at the European Women in Construction and Engineering Awards in 2017. Skinner became the youngest president of the Institution of Civil Engineers in 2020. In 2019, she was elected a Fellow of the Royal Academy of Engineering (FREng). She was appointed CBE for services to infrastructure in the 2022 New Year Honours.

== Early life and education ==
Skinner was born in December 1976. She lived in the US for two years and returned for her GCSE years to attend Downe House School and then Wellington School for sixth form. She earned a bachelor's degree with first-class honours in geography at Durham University. She said that she "fell into engineering completely by chance" when she took a job as a transport planner in 1998. In 2001, she was awarded a Master of Science degree in transportation planning and engineering with a distinction by the University of Leeds. In 2019 she returned to Durham to deliver the "Hatfield College Lecture."

== Career ==
Skinner has been involved with the Institution of Civil Engineers since 2003, when she became a chartered engineer (CEng). She is also now a fellow of the institution (FICE), and sits on its Trustee Board, and has chaired the ICE's London region in 2010, stood for Council in 2015 and was confirmed by the ICE council as succeeding vice president in April 2017. Skinner became president in November 2020. She was the youngest person ever to hold the post of president of the ICE, and the second female president. Skinner chaired the advisory board of the New Civil Engineer magazine between 2017 and November 2019. Skinner is a qualified transport planning professional and also a Fellow of the Chartered Institution of Highways and Transportation (FCIHT), as well as an honorary fellow of the Society for the Environment.

Skinner has held several senior positions at WSP Global, the consultancy and design firm, including as UK director of transportation planning and European director of marketing and communications for Parsons Brinckerhoff, and since 2022, she has been UK executive director of government relations & ESG.

Skinner helped to set up the Women in Transport (formerly Women's Transportation Seminar) network in London in June 2005 and is now one of its patrons, having been a founding member of its board and president from 2009 to 2013.

Skinner also works to encourage female students into taking up STEM subjects. She is a regular industry speaker, the lead author of papers on the implementation of driverless vehicles including "Making Better Places" (2016), "New Mobility Now" (2017) and various prior publications on the application of digital technology to the construction industry, collaboration and innovation.

Between 2018 and 2020, Skinner was one of ten commissioners for the newly formed Infrastructure Commission for Scotland.

Skinner was appointed Commander of the Order of the British Empire (CBE) in the 2022 New Year Honours for services to infrastructure. In the same year she was awarded an honorary doctorate by the University of Leeds followed by a second from the University of Exeter.

In November 2024, Skinner was appointed to chair the Department for Transport's Capital Review Panel, an advisory panel which provides independent advice to the Secretary of State for Transport on strategic considerations for the department’s capital portfolio.

Professional and academic associations
Preceded by Paul Sheffield	President of the Institution of Civil Engineers; November 2020 – November 2021	Succeeded by Ed McCann
