= Clancy Docwra =

The Clancy Group
- Traded as: The Clancy Group plc
- Industry: Construction
- Predecessor: M.J. Clancy & Sons
- Founded: 1958; 67 years ago in Wembley
- Founder: Michael Clancy
- Headquarters: Harefield, Middlesex, United Kingdom
- Key people: Matt Cannon, CEO
- Website: theclancygroup.co.uk

Clancy Docwra is a large construction firm in the United Kingdom founded in Wembley in 1958 by Michael Clancy as M.J. Clancy & Sons Limited. In 1974 the firm bought water and gas public works contractor R.E. Docwra Limited and in 2001, following other acquisitions, all were merged to form Clancy Docwra Limited. Today the firm trades as The Clancy Group plc. The firm carries out work for several national utilities including Scottish Water and Scottish Power. The firm has also carried out work for London Underground.

Recent contracts include the laying of a 10 mile long water main near Reigate, Surrey, using trenchless technology, valued at £14m.

== Plant theft ==
The firm has been particularly interested in preventing theft of construction equipment and the current Joint Chairman of the firm, Kevin Clancy, has been Chairman of the Plant Theft Action Group.

== Awards ==
In 2011, Clancy Docwra were named joint winner, with CCS Group, of the Contractor of the Year award by New Civil Engineer.
