= Aber Swing Bridge =

Aber Swing Bridge Pont yr Aber
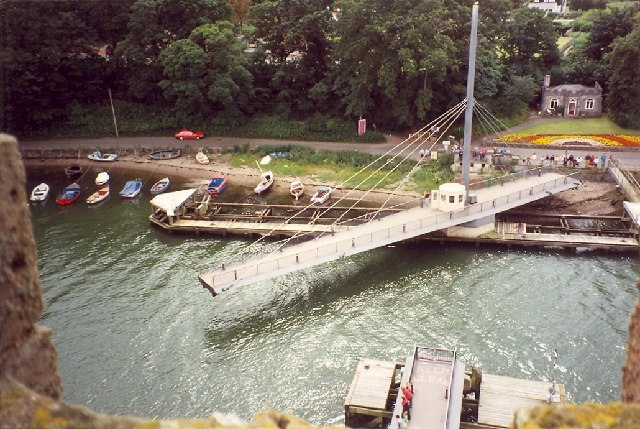
- Aber Swing Bridge in 1993
- Coordinates: 53.1390°N 4.2789°W
- Carries: Pedestrians
- Crosses: Afon Seiont

Characteristics
- Design: Swing bridge
- Material: Steel
- Trough construction: Concrete

History
- Construction end: 1970

The Aber Swing Bridge, also known as the Pont yr Aber and Caernarfon swing bridge, is a pedestrian swing bridge in Gwynedd, Wales. This footbridge crosses over the Afon Seiont from the foreshore to the Watergate entrance in the centre of Caernarfon near Caernarfon Castle. It was built in 1970, is made of concrete and steel, and is powered with electricity.

This bridge replaces another swing bridge which opened on March 1, 1900 (St. David's Day). That first bridge was built to replace the ferry. It was demolished in 1969. For a short time after that, there was a bailey bridge.
