= David Malcolm Orr =

David Orr
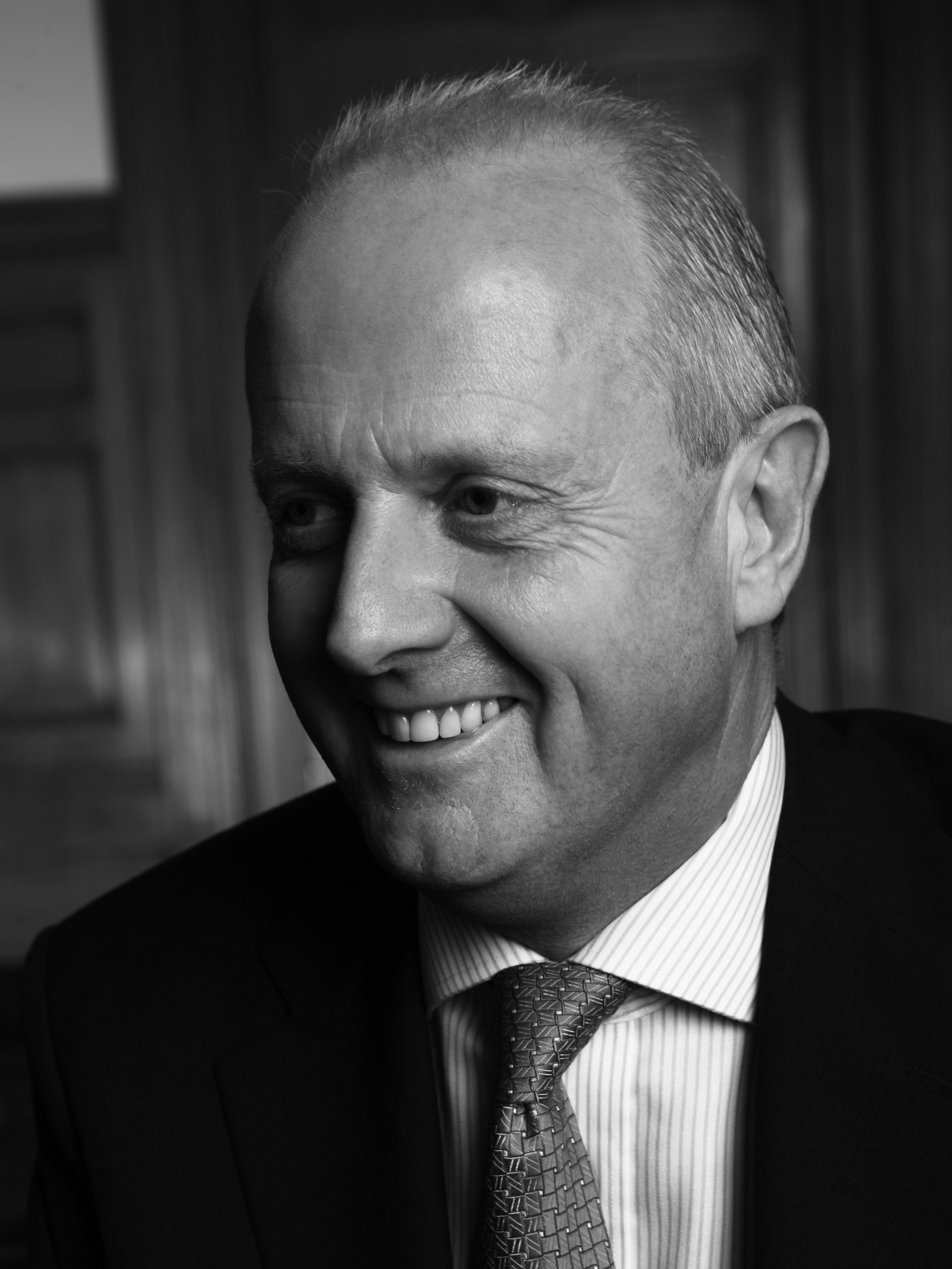
- Born: 1953 (age 72–73); Belfast, Northern Ireland
- Occupation: Civil engineer

David Orr (born 1953 in Belfast, Northern Ireland) is a civil engineer. He was the 143rd President of the Institution of Civil Engineers. He is married to Vyvienne and they have 2 children.

David Orr graduated from Queen's University Belfast in 1974 with an honours degree in civil engineering, and was awarded an MSc by Queen's in 1978. He spent much of his career with Roads Service, Northern Ireland’s road authority, latterly serving as Permanent Secretary of the Department for Regional Development.

He currently chairs the Independent Assurance Panel (Procurement) for High Speed 2, is an external member of the Palace of Westminster Restoration and Renewal Programme Board, and also chairs the Institution of Civil Engineers Benevolent Fund. From 2008 to 2014 he chaired the Procurement Expert Panel for London's Crossrail.

In his Presidential Address, Orr encouraged civil engineers to:

- stand up for civil engineering - delivering public works of real value;
- stand up for professionalism - there to protect the public;
- stand up for excellence in procurement - the key to project success; and
- stand up for civil engineers - unsung heroes no more.

He listed as one of his unsung heroes William Bald, who between 1832 and 1842 constructed the Antrim Coast Road.

== Awards and honours ==
- 2010 Commander of the Order of the British Empire
- 2009 Fellow of the Royal Academy of Engineering
- 2009 Gold Medal of the Institution of Civil Engineers
- 2007-08 President of the Institution of Civil Engineers
- 2007 Fellow of the Irish Academy of Engineering
- 2007 Fellow of the Institution of Highways and Transportation
- 2005 Chartered Environmentalist
- 2002 Fellow of the Institution of Civil Engineers
- 1990 Winston Churchill Fellow
- 1981 Member of the Institution of Civil Engineers and Chartered Civil Engineer
- 1978 MSc Civil Engineering, Queen's University Belfast
- 1974 BSc Civil Engineering with Honours, Queen's University Belfast

Professional and academic associations
Preceded by Quentin John Leiper	President of the Institution of Civil Engineers; November 2007– November 2008	Succeeded by Jean Venables
