= Roger Gaskell Hetherington =

British civil servant and engineer

Sir Roger Gaskell Hetherington
- Born: 10 February 1876; Sherborne, Dorset, England
- Died: 24 February 1952 (aged 76); Highgate, London, England
- Education: Highgate School
- Spouse: Honoria Ford
- Children: Mary, Roger LeGeyt, Arthur Ford and Stephen Lonsdale
- Parent(s): William Lonsdale Hetherington, Mary Gaskell
- Engineering career
- Discipline: Civil
- Institutions: Institution of Civil Engineers (President)

Sir Roger Gaskell Hetherington CB, OBE (10 February 1876 – 24 February 1952) was a British civil engineer and civil servant.

== Life ==
Roger Gaskell Hetherington was born in Sherborne, Dorset on 10 February 1876, the eldest son of William Lonsdale Hetherington and his wife, Mary Gaskell, daughter of John Dakin Gaskell, a barrister of Highgate, London. His father was assistant Master at Sherborne School when he was born, but the family soon after returned to Highgate.

He entered Highgate School in 1889. After school he attended Trinity College, Cambridge,

Hetherington served as an officer in the 4th (Cambridge University) Volunteer Battalion of the Suffolk Regiment but resigned his commission as Captain on 24 November 1897. Hetherington returned to the British Army during the First World War when he was appointed temporary Inspector of Works in the Staff of the Royal Engineers with the honorary rank of Lieutenant on 14 April 1915.

All his life he suffered from a weak heart and was never passed fit for active service. He relinquished that commission upon the completion of his service on 25 February 1919, retaining his rank. Hetherington married Honoria Ford on 24 April 1906. She was the youngest daughter of the solicitor Arthur Ranken Ford, who lived close (1 Broadlands Road) to Roger's parents in Highgate (3 Broadlands Road). They had a daughter and three sons, the second of whom was Sir Arthur Ford Hetherington (1911–2002) who was Chairman of British Gas plc.

Hetherington had become a governor at Highgate School in 1917. He served the school as treasurer and chairman of governors from 1929 to 1944. He had an interest in education and was also chairman of the council of Wycombe Abbey School.

Hetherington's career as a civil servant began in 1930 when he became the Chief Engineering Inspector at the Ministry of Health, a post he would hold until 1944. He became an official adviser on water and the Director of Surveys for the ministry in 1941 in which capacity he served until 1952.

Hetherington had been appointed an Officer of the Order of the British Empire in 1918, a Companion of the Order of the Bath in 1932 and was made Knight Bachelor in the 1945 New Year Honours.

On 24 June 1947, at a special general meeting of the Institution of Civil Engineers, he was elected their president for the November 1947 to November 1948 session. Hetherington was only elected because the death of the president-elect Sir Frederick Cook following his election in May. This was the second successive year that the ICE's president-elect had died before entering office. Hetherington died in 1952.

His eldest son Roger Le Geyt Hetherington (1908–1990) was president of the ICE for 1972–73.

Professional and academic associations
Preceded by William Halcrow	President of the Institution of Civil Engineers; November 1947 – November 1948	Succeeded by Jonathan Davidson
