= Pressuremeter test =

A pressuremeter is a meter constructed to measure the “at-rest horizontal earth pressure”. The pressuremeter has two major components. The first component is a read-out unit that remains above ground. The second component of the pressure meter is a probe that is inserted into the borehole (ground) to read the pressure.

== History ==
A man named Louis Menard in 1955 first brought the pressuremeter to the forefront. He started the first production of it in France in 1955.

== How it works ==
The probe of the pressuremeter is inserted into the borehole and is supported at test depth. The probe is an inflatable flexible membrane which applies even pressure to the walls of the borehole as it expands. As the pressure increases and the membrane expands, the walls of the borehole begin to deform. The pressure inside the probe is held constant for a specific period of time and the increase in volume required to maintain the pressure is recorded. There are two types of tests that can be performed with the pressuremeter. The stress controlled test increases pressure in equal increments while the strain controlled test increases the volume in equal increments.

== How it is used ==
The pressuremeter is used to test hard clays, dense sands and weathered rock which cannot be tested with push equipment. It allows engineers to design foundations that will be stable in these conditions. There are three different types of pressuremeters. The borehole pressuremeter is the most common and has a probe that is inserted into a preformed hole (borehole). The second type of pressuremeter is called a self-boring pressuremeter. The self-boring pressuremeter has a probe that is self-bored into the ground to prevent disturbance. The third pressuremeter is called a cone pressuremeter. The cone pressuremeter has a cone shaped probe that is inserted into the base of the borehole, it then displaces the soil into the cone of the probe which causes less disturbance to the soil to get a more accurate reading. Different soil types sometimes require different types of pressuremeter tests.
