= Albuquerque (disambiguation) =

Albuquerque is the largest city in the state of New Mexico, United States.

Albuquerque may also refer to:

== People ==
- Afonso de Albuquerque, 1st Duke of Goa
- Albuquerque (surname)
- Albuquerque Mendes (born 1953), Portuguese artist
- Maria Luís Albuquerque, EU-commissioner

== Entertainment ==
- Albuquerque (film), a 1948 Western starring Randolph Scott
- "Albuquerque" (song), the last song on "Weird Al" Yankovic's album Running with Scissors
- "Albuquerque", the eighth song on Neil Young's album Tonight's the Night

== Ships ==
- USS Albuquerque (PF-7), a United States Tacoma-class frigate (transferred to Japan in 1953)
- USS Albuquerque (SSN-706), a United States Los Angeles-class attack submarine

== Other ==
- Cayos de Albuquerque, uninhabited Colombian islands in the Caribbean

== See also ==
- Albuquerque & Takaoka, a Brazilian architecture, civil engineering and real estate development company
- Alquerque, a strategy board game, considered the parent of the draughts board games
- Alburquerque (disambiguation)
