= Gated community =

Residential community with controlled entrances

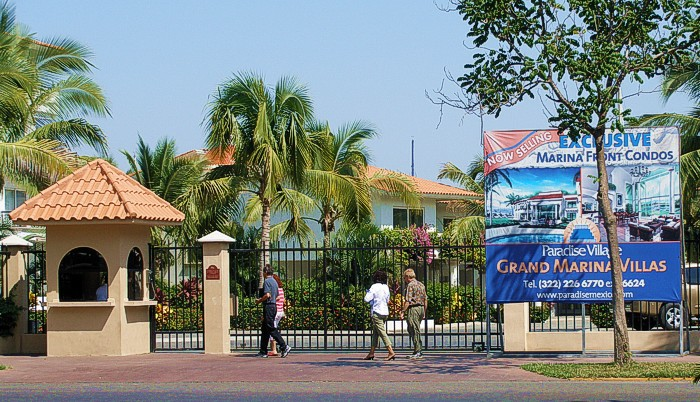
Entrance to the Paradise Village Grand Marina Villas, Nuevo Vallarta, Nayarit, Mexico

A gated community (or walled community) is a form of residential community or housing estate constituting strictly controlled entrances for pedestrians, bicycles, and automobiles, and often characterized by a closed perimeter of walls and fences. Gated communities usually constitute small residential streets and include various shared amenities. For smaller communities, these amenities may include only a park or other common area. For larger communities, it may be possible for residents to stay within the community for most daily activities. Gated communities are a type of common interest development, but are distinct from intentional communities.

For socio-historical reasons, in the developed world they exist primarily in the United States.

Given that gated communities are spatially a type of enclave, Setha M. Low, an anthropologist, has argued that they have a negative effect on the net social capital of the broader community outside the gated community. Some gated communities, usually called "guard-gated communities", are staffed by private security guards and are often home to high-value properties, and/or are set up as retirement villages.

== Features ==
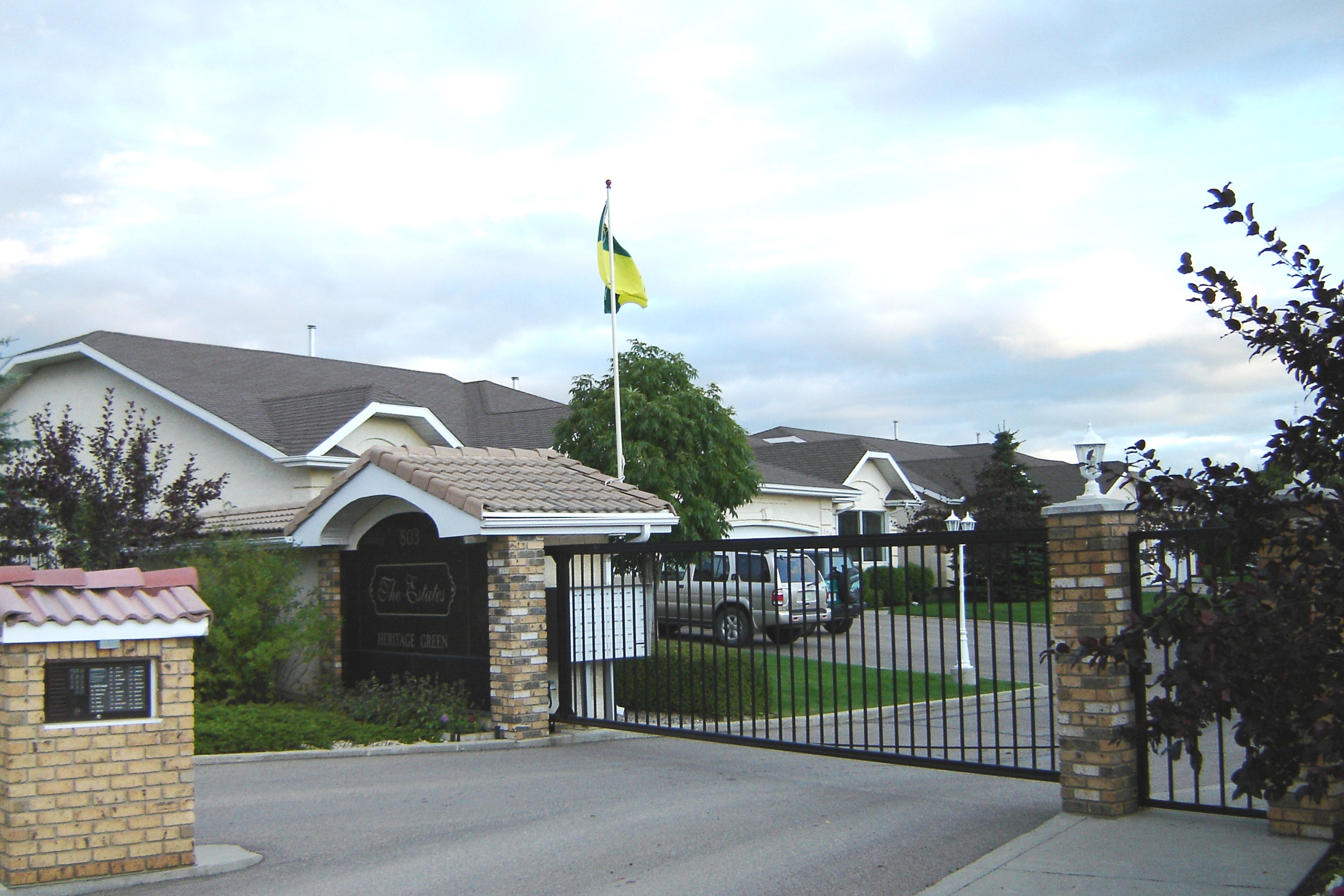
A guarded, gated community in Saskatoon, Saskatchewan, Canada

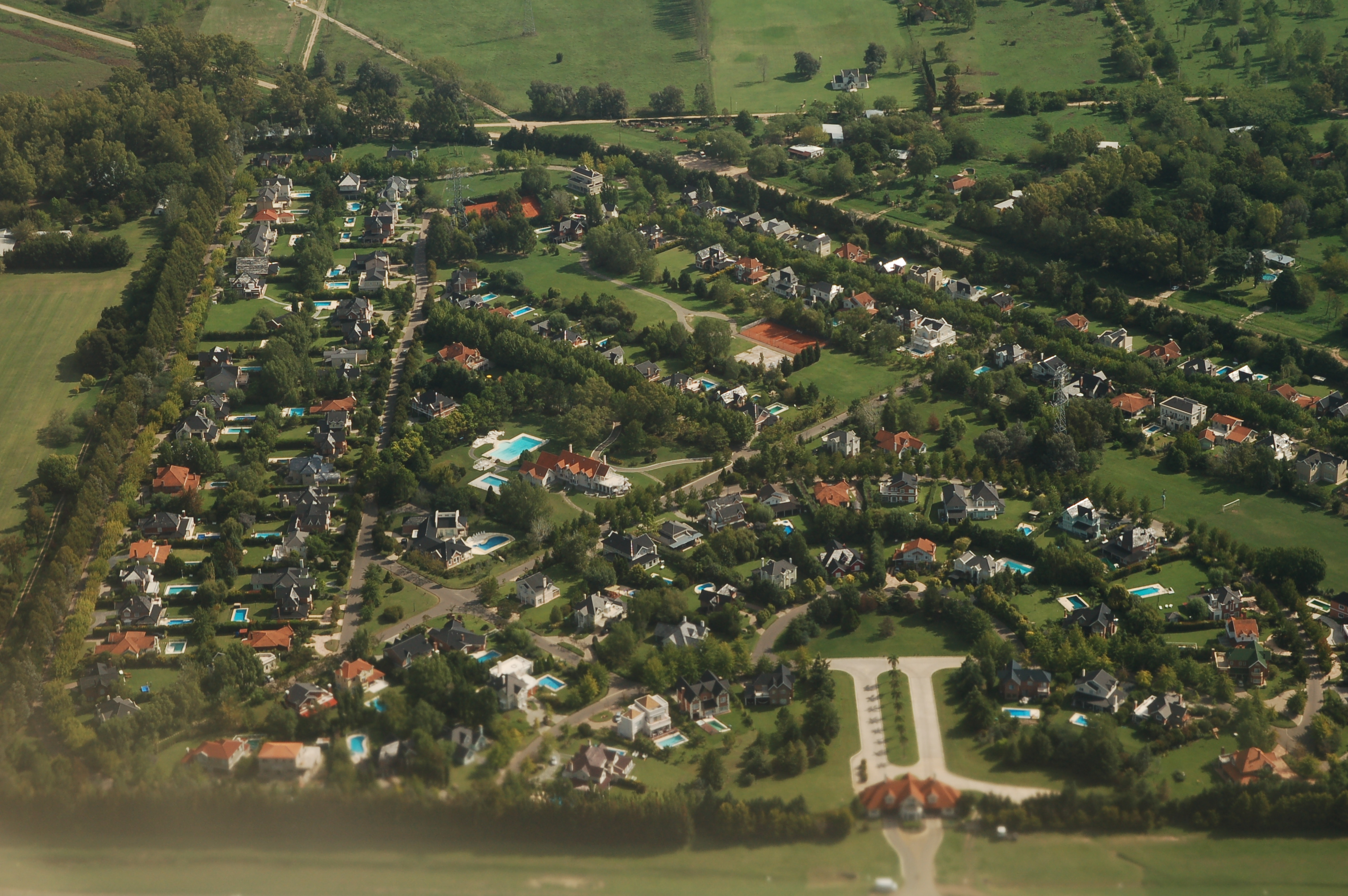
A gated community near Ezeiza, a suburb of Buenos Aires, Argentina

Besides the services of gatekeepers, many gated communities provide other amenities. These may depend on a number of factors including geographical location, demographic composition, community structure, and community fees collected. When there are sub-associations that belong to master associations, the master association may provide many of the amenities. In general, the larger the association the more amenities that can be provided.

Amenities also depend on the type of housing. For example, single-family-home communities may not have a common-area swimming pool, since individual home-owners have the ability to construct their own private pools. A condominium, on the other hand, may offer a community pool, since the individual units do not have the option of a private pool installation.

Typical amenities offered can include one or more:

- Swimming pools
- Bowling alleys
- Tennis courts
- Community centres or clubhouses
- Golf courses
- Marina
- On-site dining
- Playgrounds
- Exercise rooms including workout machines
- Spa
- Coworking spaces

== Around the world ==
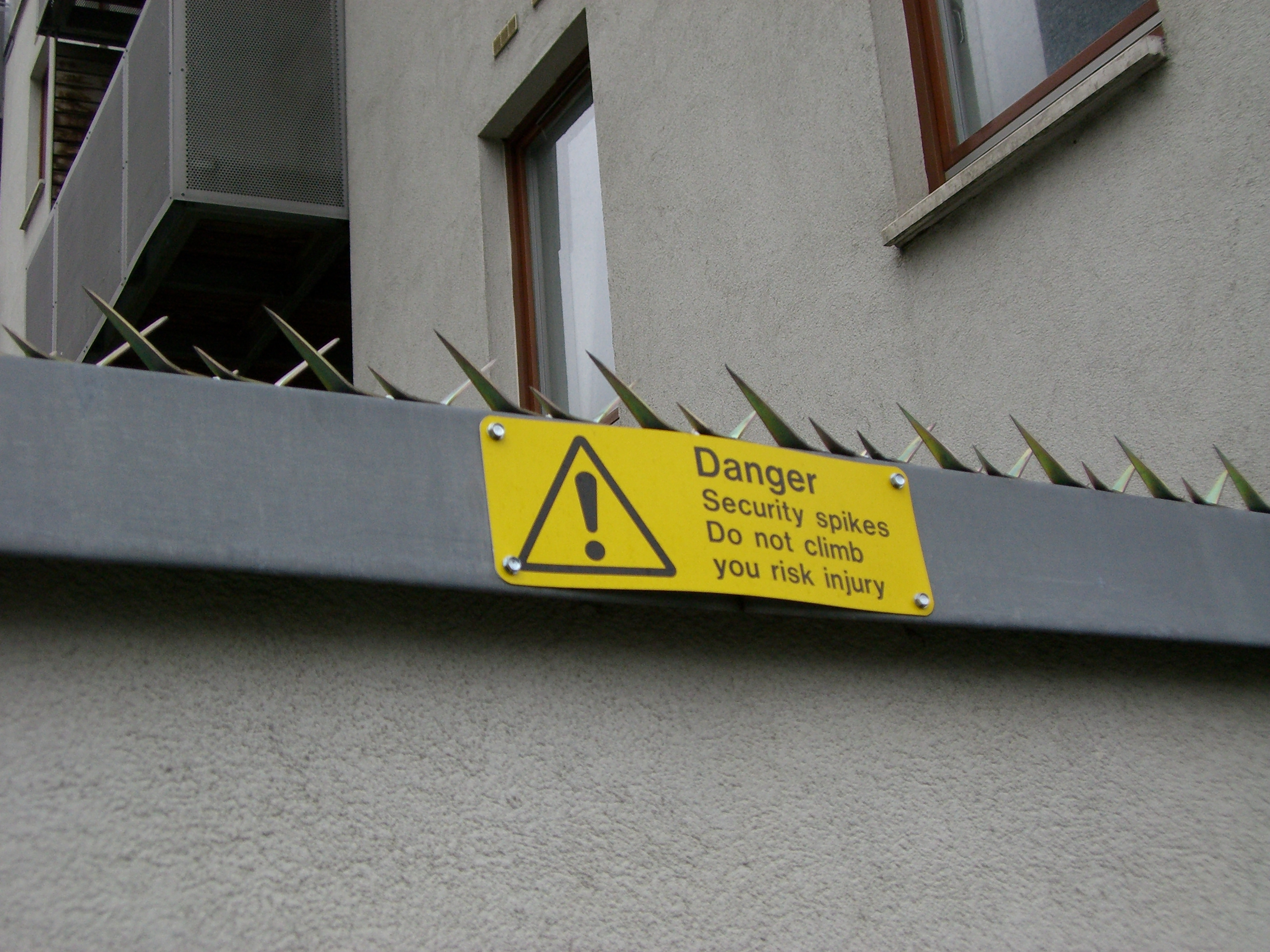
Protective spikes in "security-zone" communities

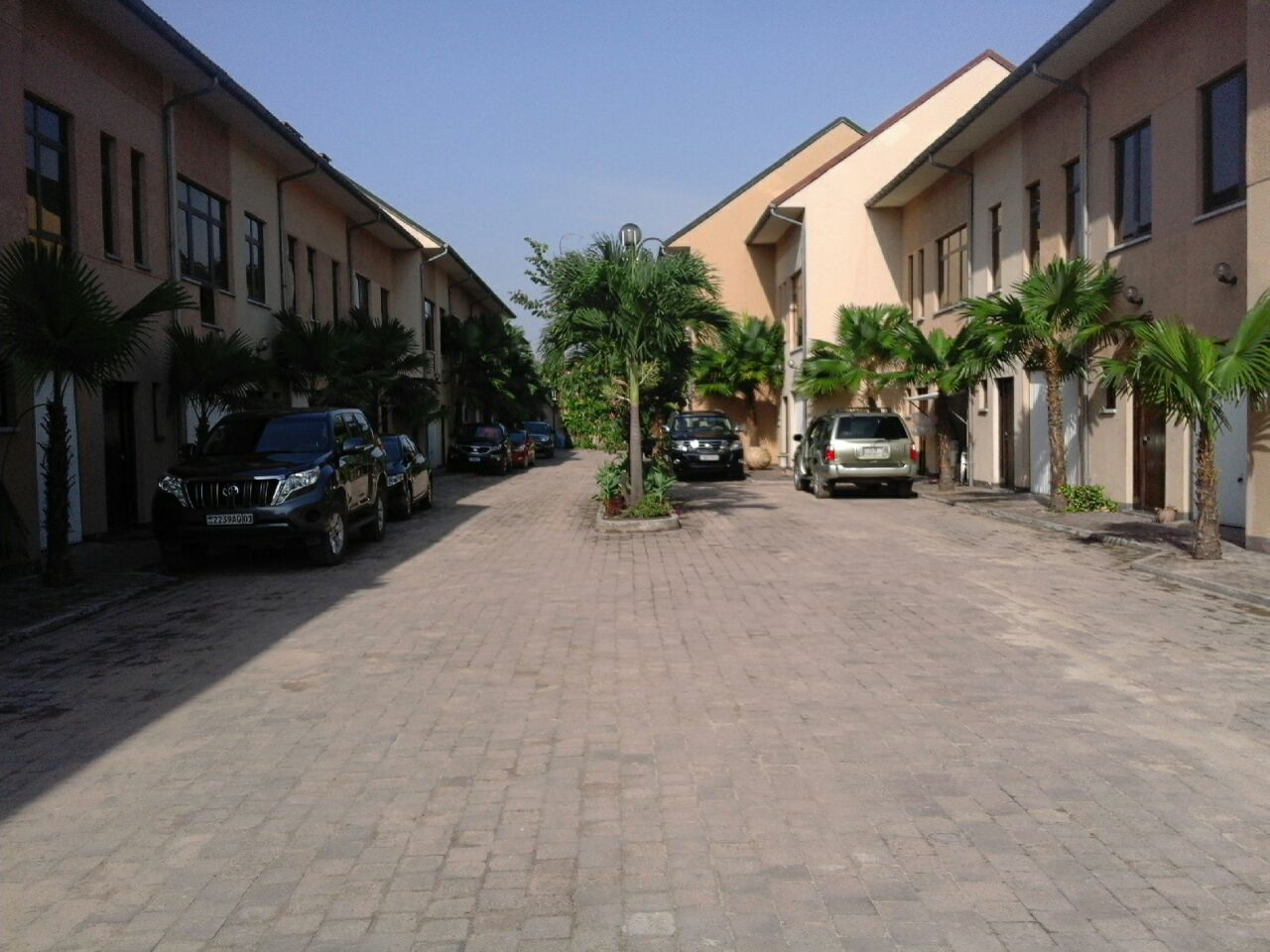
The inside of a gated community in Ngaliema, Kinshasa, DRC

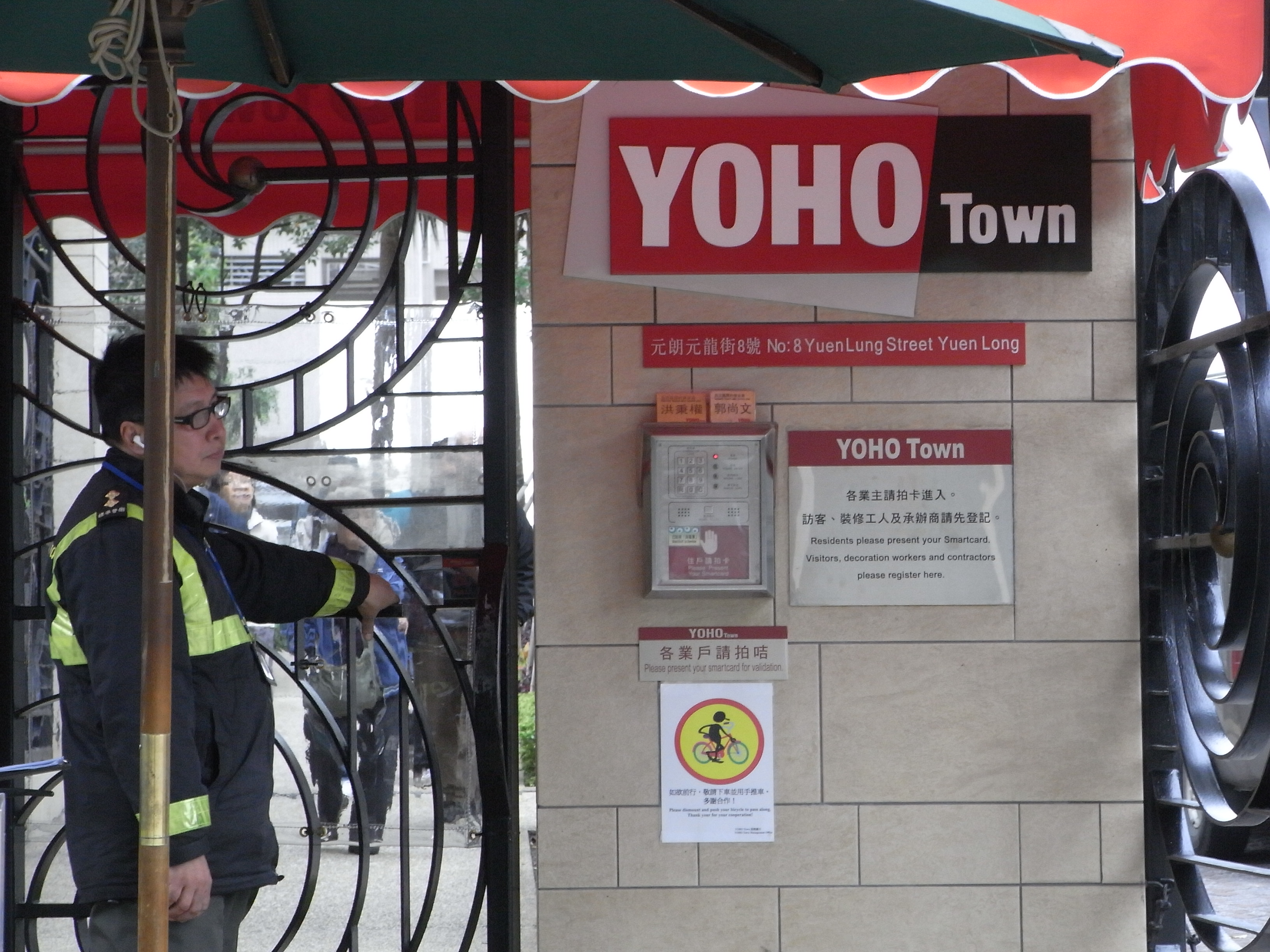
A gated community in Hong Kong YOHO Town

In Brazil, the most widespread form of gated community is called "condomínio fechado" (closed housing estate) and is the object of desire of the upper classes. Such a place is a small town with its own infrastructure (reserve power supply, sanitation, and security guards). The purpose of such a community is to protect its residents from exterior violence. The same philosophy is seen on closed buildings and most shopping centres (many of them can only be accessed from inside the parking lot or the garage).

In Mexico, the most common form of a gated community is called privada, fraccionamiento, or condominio, in which privadas and fraccionamientos are mostly composed of individual, single-family houses grouped, these may vary on size and shape, sometimes, houses will be individually developed and built while in others (primarily in fraccionamientos) houses are of the same design and shape. In fraccionamientos, these houses may have access to amenities within the gated zone as well, such as parks, gyms, party rooms, pools and maintenance by the residential's administration. Condominios are commonly similar to fraccionamientos and privadas, but applied in a scheme of apartment buildings.

In Pakistan, gated communities are located in big as well as small cities and are considered the standard of high quality living. Defence Housing Authority and Bahria Town are major private gated community developers and administrators and one of the largest in the world. The assets of Bahria Town itself are worth $30 billion. Most gated communities in Pakistan have public parks, schools, hospitals, shopping malls, gymnasiums, and country clubs.

In Argentina, they are called "barrios privados" (literal translation "private neighbourhoods") or just "countries" (which comes from a shortening of the term "country club") and are often seen as a symbol of wealth. However, gated communities enjoy dubious social prestige (many members of the middle and upper middle class regard gated community dwellers as nouveaux riches or snobs). While most gated communities have only houses, some bigger ones, such as Nordelta, have their own hospital, school, shopping mall, and more.

In post-apartheid South Africa, gated communities have mushroomed in response to high levels of violent crime. They are commonly referred to as "complexes" but also broadly classified as "security villages" (large-scale privately developed areas) or "enclosed neighbourhoods". Some of the newest neighbourhoods being developed are almost entirely composed of security villages, some with malls and few other essential services (such as hospitals). In part, property developers have adopted this response to counter squatting, which local residents fear due to associated crime, and which often results in a protracted eviction process.

They are popular in southern China and Hong Kong, where most of the new apartment compounds have 24/7 guards on duty, and for some high-end residences, facial recognition systems to grant residents and domestic workers entry into the compound. The most famous of which is Clifford Estates in Guangzhou.

In Saudi Arabia, gated communities have existed since the discovery of oil, mainly to accommodate families from Europe or North America. After threat levels increased from the late 1990s on against foreigners in general and U.S. citizens in particular, gates became armed, sometimes heavily, and all vehicles are inspected. Marksmen and Saudi Arabian National Guard armored vehicles appeared in certain times, markedly after recent terrorist attacks in areas near-by, targeting people from European or North American countries.

Gated communities are rare in continental Europe and Japan.

== Criticism ==
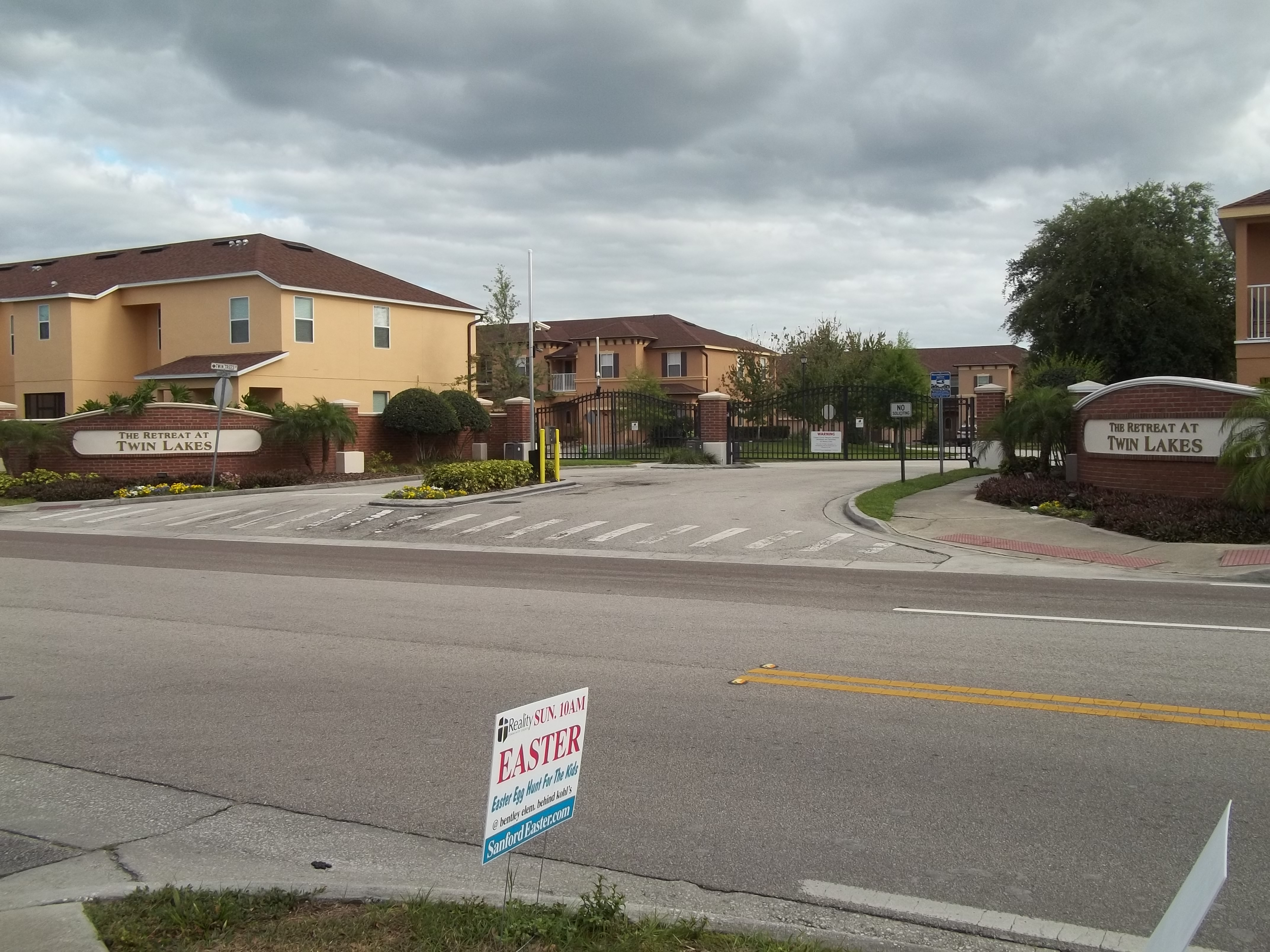
The Retreat at Twin Lakes

Proponents of gated communities (and to a lesser degree, of cul-de-sacs) maintain that the reduction or exclusion of people who would be only passing through, or more generally, of all non-local people, makes any "stranger" much more recognisable in the closed local environment, and thus reduces crime danger. However, some have argued that, since only a very small proportion of all non-local people passing through the area are potential criminals, saying that increased traffic should increase rather than decrease safety by having more people around whose presence could deter criminal behaviour or who could provide assistance during an incident.

Another criticism is that gated communities offer a false sense of security. Some studies indicate that safety in gated communities may be more illusion than reality and that gated communities in suburban areas of the United States have no less crime than similar non-gated neighbourhoods.

In a paper, Vanessa Watson includes gated communities within a class of "African urban fantasies": attempts to remake African cities in the vein of Dubai or Singapore. In Watson's analysis, this kind of urban planning prizes exclusionary and self-contained spaces that limit opportunities for interaction between different classes, while worsening marginalization of the urban poor.

A study done by Breetzke, Landman & Cohn (2014) investigated the effect of gated communities on individual's risk of burglary victimization in South Africa. Results showed that not only are gated communities not able to reduce burglary, but even facilitate criminal activities. For both the gated communities and the areas surrounding them, the densities of burglary were found to be four times higher than that of Tshwane. The crime rates did not decrease in areas that were far away from the gated communities. Also, the high risk of burglaries was found consistent in both daytime and night-time. As this research on the effect of gated communities in South Africa reflects a negative correlation between the use of gated communities and crime prevention, the effectiveness of gated communities is in doubt.

== Common economic model types ==
- Life-style — country clubs, retirement developments
- Prestige — gates for status appeal
- Physical security communities — gates for crime and traffic
- Purpose-designed communities — catering to foreigners (e.g. worker compounds in Mid-West Asia, built largely for the oil industry)

== Comparison to closed cities ==
Closed cities are different from the gated communities.

- The guard duty in closed cities is free to residents (paid by taxes).
- The public transport in closed cities may go with transit checkpoints or checking passes/passports at technical stops and available to others outside the security area. Within a gated community in the best cases, the bus stop is opposite the checkpoint; a few offer free buses. Via gated communities buses go due to easement or good will.
- Fares and communal payments in closed cities are often equal (in all cases, not greater), if it would be a common city. In gated communities, service companies raise non legally fixed tariffs because it is difficult for those communities either to negotiate lower terms or knock out this service company (in most cases, the result is no quorum).

== Countries ==
A limited number of gated communities have long been established for foreigners in various countries of the world:

- In the Arabian Gulf, petroleum companies developed residential compounds for their employees, including Awali in Bahrain, Ahmadi in Kuwait, and Dhahran in Saudi Arabia, beginning in the 1940s.
- The Arbor Oaks subdivision in El Monte, California, which appears in the film Back to the Future Part II as "Hilldale", is now gated because of the fans coming to see it in person. Residents are sometimes angry at fans who come by the development.

=== Argentina ===
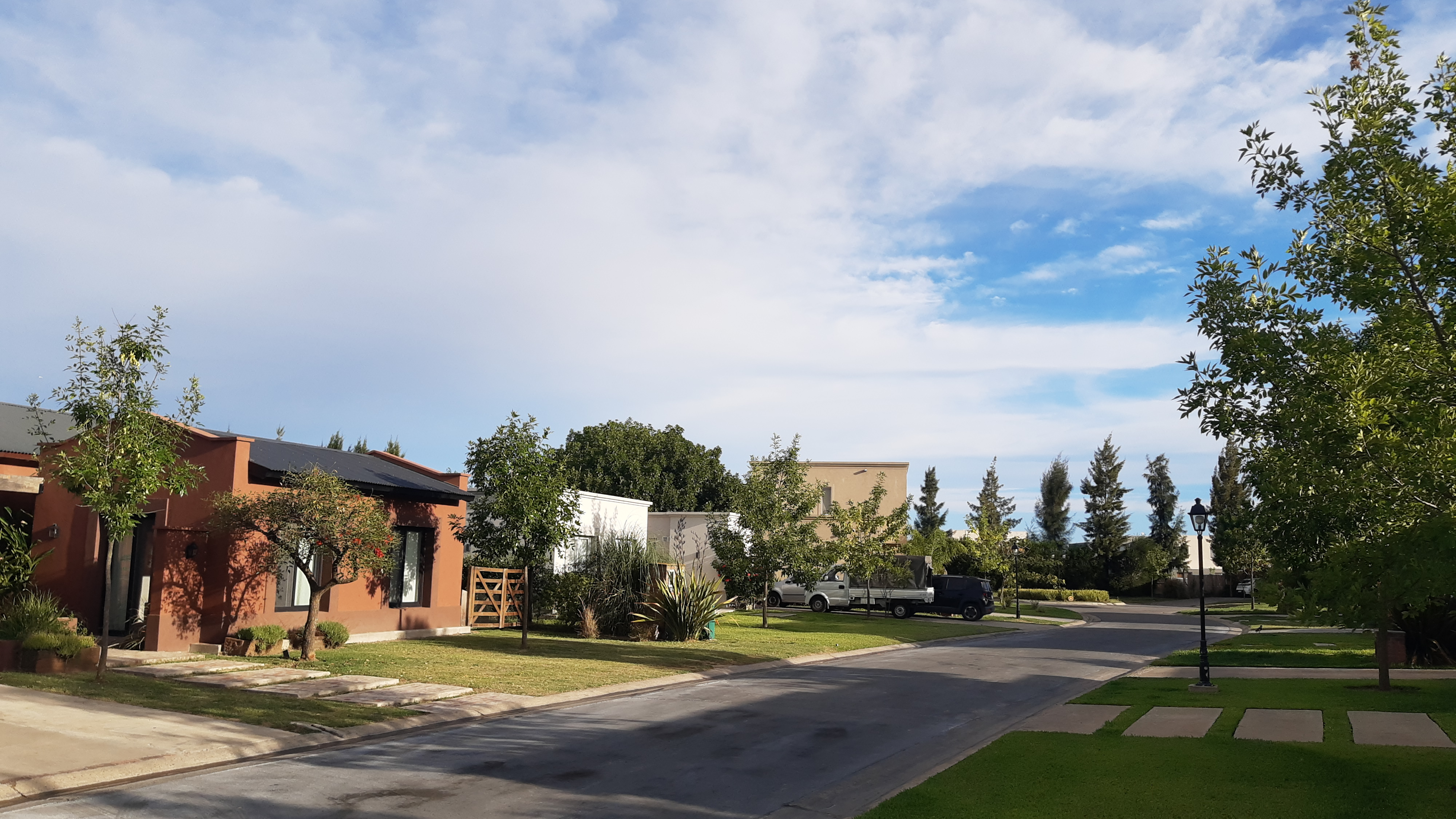
Internal street of Barrio San Gabriel, in Tigre Partido.

There are many gated communities in Argentina, especially in Greater Buenos Aires, in the suburb of Pilar, 60 km N of Buenos Aires city, and in other suburban areas, such as Nordelta. Tortugas Country Club was the first gated community developed in Argentina, dating from the 1930s/1940s, but most date from the 1990s, when liberal reforms were consolidated.

Since Buenos Aires has been traditionally regarded as a socially integrated city, gated communities have been the subject of research by sociologists. Gated communities are an important way through middle and upper-class people cope with insecurity in Greater Buenos Aires.

As Mara Dicenta writes, "The story of Nordelta exposes how violent environments are enacted through whiteness and drives for elite distinction. Exemplified by Nordelta, MPCs generate profit by transforming rural into elite lands while rearticulating racial and spatial borders that make distinctions sharper, more guarded, and less porous—between centers and peripheries, grounded and flooded lands, or poachers and conservationists. MPCs originated in the U.S. and continue to circulate American imaginaries of race, segregation, and neoliberal commons worldwide. In this process, they are met with different forms of slow violence rooted in colonial and postcolonial national geographies. Furthermore, in seeking to capitalize on those racialized differences, global real estate corporations also circulate and help materialize homogenizing visions of racial formation."

=== Australia ===
Although gated communities have been rare in Australia, since the 1980s, a few have been built. The most well-known are those at Hope Island, in particular Sanctuary Cove, on the Gold Coast of Queensland. Other similar projects are being built in the area. In Victoria, the first such development is Sanctuary Lakes, in the local government area of Wyndham, about 16 km south west of Melbourne. In New South Wales, there is Macquarie Links gated community as well as Southgate Estate gated community. Many Australian gated communities are built within private golf courses.

In the ACT, the only example is Uriarra Village, based around community horse paddocks and dwellings jointly managed through strata title.

=== Bangladesh ===
The trade association for real estate developers in Bangladesh, RAJUK, stated in 2021 that the capital city Dhaka had approximately 25 gated communities. While RAJUK claimed that these communities adhered to the global standard of keeping 60% of the land in the gated community for open spaces and common use, the Bangladesh Institute of Planners disputed this claim, advocating for fewer gated communities in the city centres.

=== Brazil ===
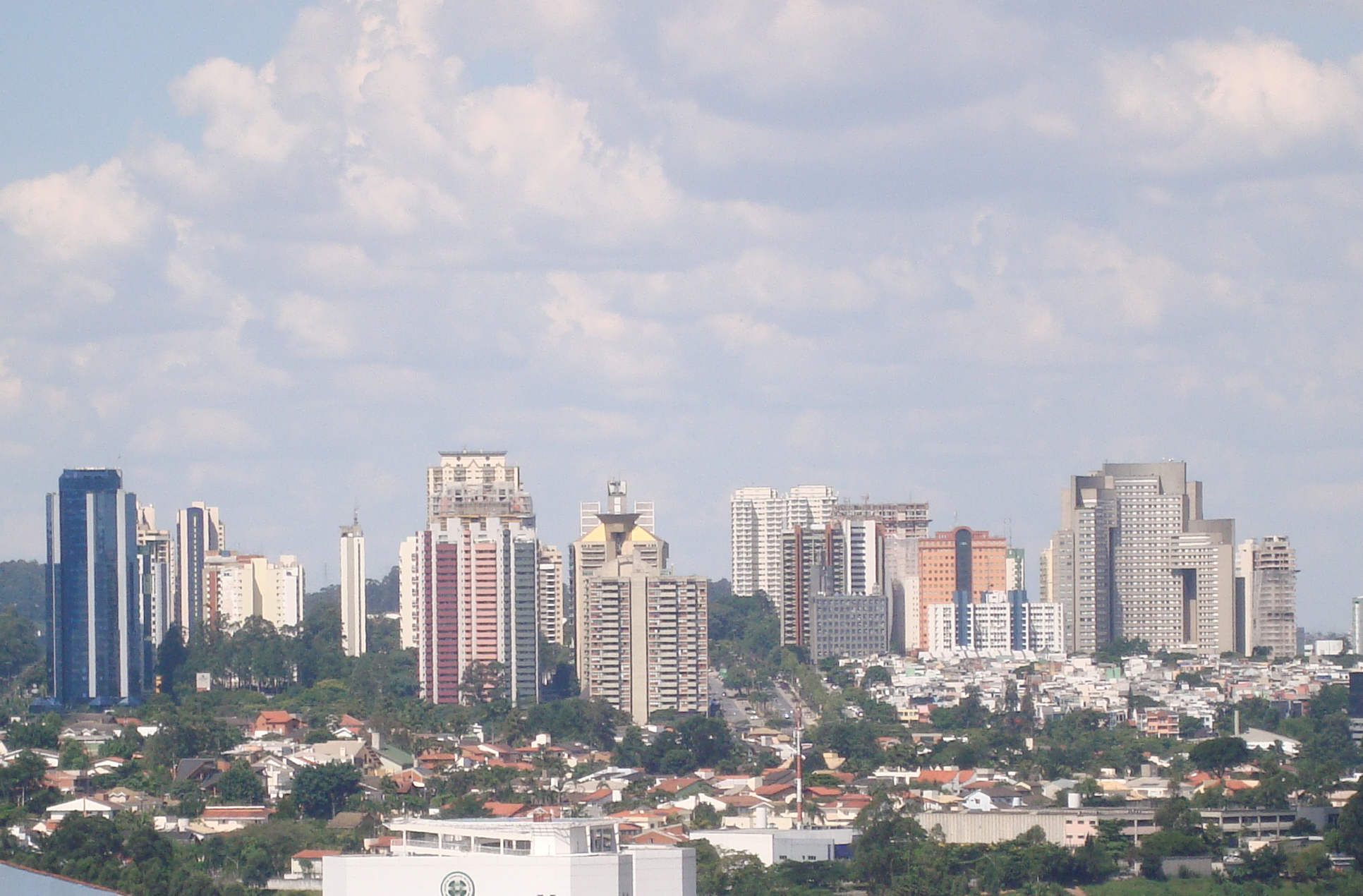
Alphaville, a gated community in the suburbs of São Paulo, Brazil, which is also a business center of its city proper, Barueri

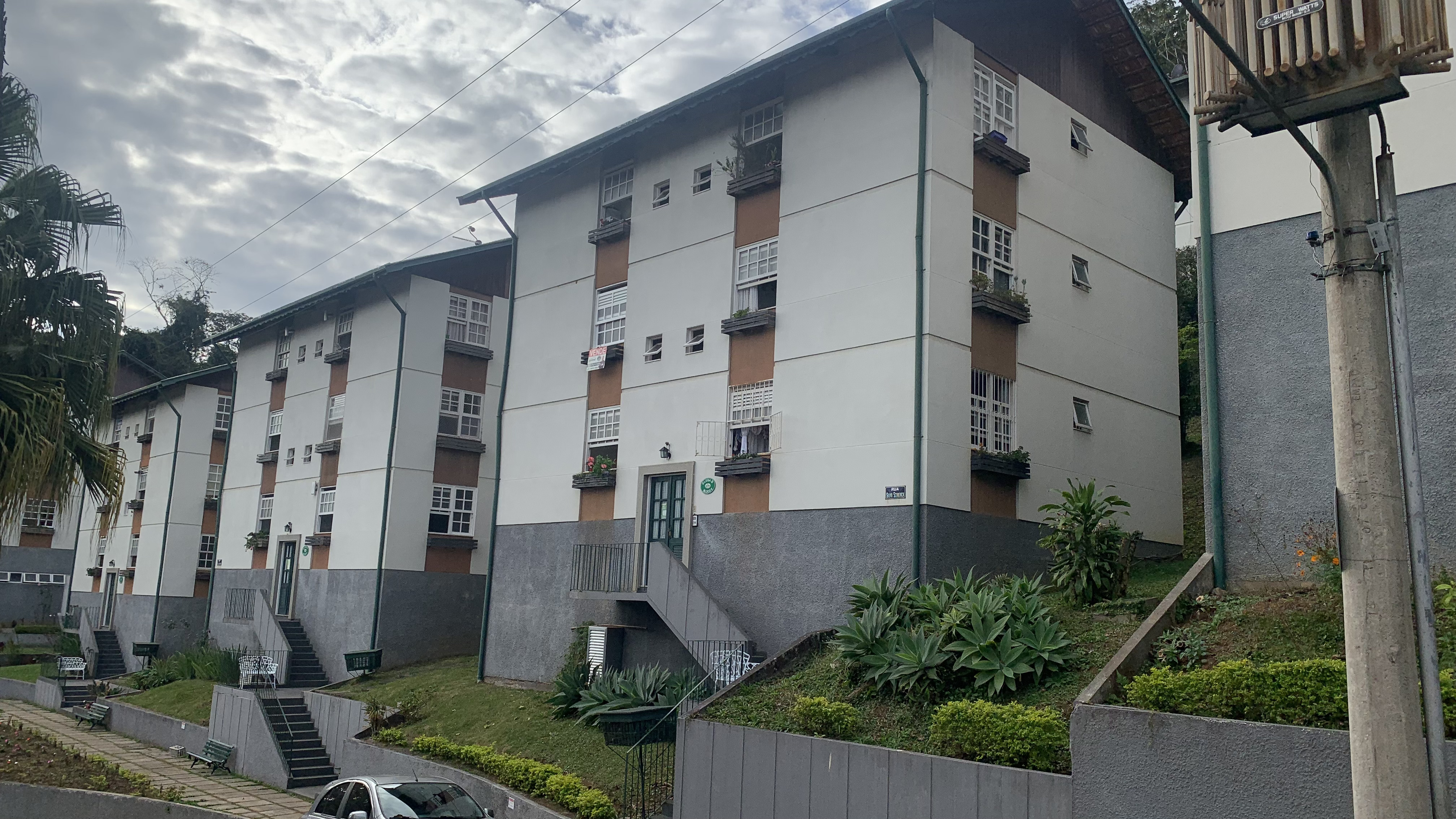
Serravile Housing Estate, located in Nova Friburgo, Rio de Janeiro

Brazil also has many gated communities, particularly in the metropolitan regions Rio de Janeiro and São Paulo. For example, one of São Paulo's suburbs, Tamboré, has at least 6 such compounds known as Tamboré 1, 2, 3, and so on. Each consists of generously spaced detached houses with very little to separate front gardens.

One of the first large-scale gated community projects in São Paulo city region was Barueri's Alphaville, planned and constructed during the 1970s military dictatorship when the big cities of Brazil faced steep increases of car ownership by the middle and higher-classes, rural exodus, poverty, crime, urban sprawl, and downtown decay.

=== Canada ===
Neighbourhoods with "physical" or explicit gating with security checkpoints and patrols are extremely rare, being absent in even some of Canada's richest neighbourhoods such as Bridle Path, Toronto. Furthermore, municipal planning laws in many Canadian provinces ban locked gates on public roads as a health issue since they deny emergency vehicles quick access.

A noted exception in Canada is Arbutus Ridge, an age-restricted community constructed between 1988 and 1992 on the southeastern coast of Vancouver Island.

More common in most Canadian neighbourhoods, especially the largest cities, is an implicit or symbolic gating which effectively partitions the private infrastructure and amenities of these communities from their surrounding neighbourhoods. A classic example of this is the affluent Montreal suburb of Mount Royal, which has a long fence running along its side of L'Acadie Boulevard that for all intents and purposes separates the community from the more working-class neighbourhood of Park Extension. Also, many newer suburban subdivisions employ decorative gates to give the impression of exclusivity and seclusion. Some gated communities have been planned in recent years in Greater Toronto, although they are infrequent.

=== China ===
In China, some of these compounds, like most other gated communities around the world, target the rich. Also many foreigners live in gated communities in Beijing. Often foreign companies choose the locations where their foreign employees will live, and in most cases, they pay the rent and associated costs (e.g. management fees and garden work).

Similar communities exist in Shanghai, another major Chinese city. Shanghai Links, an exclusive expatriate community enclosing a golf course and the Pudong campus of Shanghai American School, is an example. The Shanghai Links project began in 1994 with the signing by the then Prime Minister of Canada, Honourable Jean Chretien, of a Memorandum of Agreement with the Shanghai Pudong New Area Government controlled company, Huaxia Tourism Development Company. Other notable gated communities in Shanghai include Seasons Villas, a development by Hutchinson Whampoa; Thomson Golf Villas, and Green Villas.

Other gated communities in China such as those in the Daxing District of Beijing enclose the homes of rural migrants. These are intended to reduce crime and increase public order and safety, which the Chinese Communist Party-run People's Daily claims it has, by 73%. The system is controversial as it segregates migrants and the poor, with some claiming its true purpose is to keep track of migrants, but it is scheduled for implementation in Changping District also. In Guangzhou, Australian Villa is an example of an early gated villa community built in the 1990s to attract both affluent locals and expatriates.

=== Ecuador ===
Ecuador has many gated communities, mostly in Guayaquil and Quito. In the coastal city of Guayaquil, gated communities are mostly located in Samborondón, and in Quito in the valleys surrounding the city. These are home mostly for the wealthiest. However, there is a trend -especially in Guayaquil- of houses in gated communities with moderate prices.

=== Egypt ===
Due to the population boom and an increasing class segregation, gated communities have been more and more established in Egypt since the 1970s. Greater Cairo, for example, is home to El Rehab and Dreamland, Mountain View Egypt. There is also El Maamoura in Alexandria. They were criticized for being a niche market that fails to address the crippling congestion problem in Cairo.

=== Indonesia ===
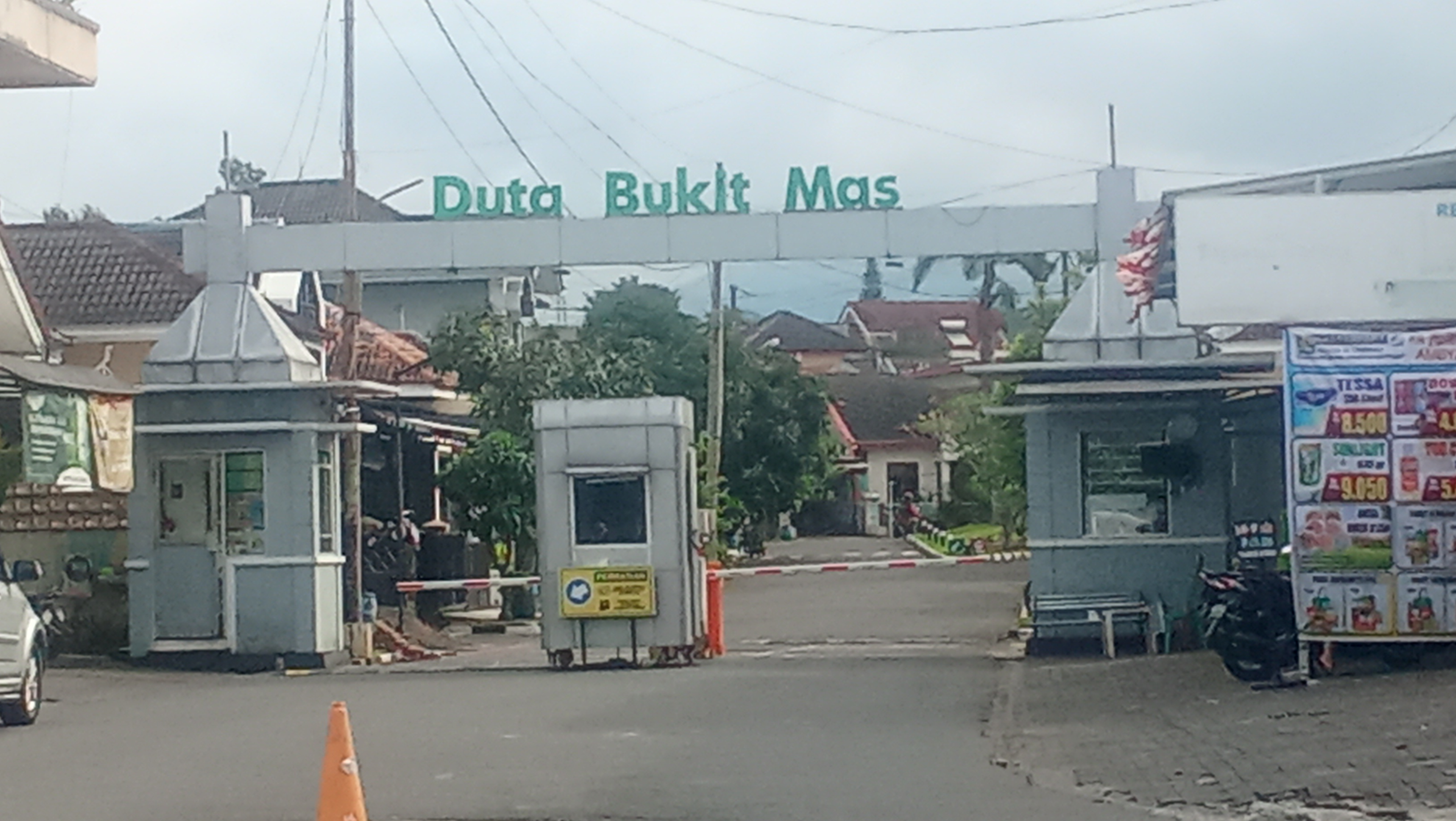
Duta Bukit Mas, an example of a gated community in Semarang, Indonesia.

In Indonesia, some gated communities are luxurious (with up to 740 square metres (8000 sq ft)), and some are very affordable (with lots ranging from 40 to 120 square metres). From 2000, most of the new residential areas built by private developers are mostly composed of gated communities. Examples include the residential areas of Bumi Serpong Damai in South Tangerang, Tropicana Residence Community in Tangerang City, Telaga Golf Sawangan and Pesona Khayangan in Depok, and Sentul City in Bogor Regency. Gated communities in Indonesia still allow outsiders to use some of the facilities inside the community because there is a regulation that the social facilities in the residential development should be handed to the local government to be used by the public.

=== Italy ===
Two examples of gated community in Italy are Olgiata in Rome and the village of Roccamare, in Castiglione della Pescaia, Tuscany.

=== Lebanon ===
Because of the pollution, the lack of proper infrastructure, electrical power and green spaces in residential areas outside of Beirut, the high class society chooses to reside in gated communities for a better living environment.

Gated communities in Lebanon are mainly in the suburbs of the capital city Beirut.

=== Malaysia ===
In Malaysia, these are known as Gated and Guarded Communities and have been seeing a steady increase in popularity. Currently, according to the Town and Country Planning Department, there are four types of gated communities in Malaysia, namely:

1. Elite community: this type of gated community is primarily occupied by the upper-class or high-income group of people. It focuses on exclusion and status in which security is one of the major concerns due to the resident's status within the community.
2. Lifestyle community: the lifestyle community generally consists of retirement communities, leisure communities and suburban 'new towns'. Activities inside these communities can include golf courses, horseback riding and residents-oriented leisure activities.
3. Security zone community: the security zone community is the most popular type of gated community in which it offers a housing development that is surrounded by fences or gates. This development is normally provided with guard services.
4. Security zone community and lifestyle: this type of gated community housing development is usually developed within a city centre. It focuses on both the security aspect and the provision of lifestyle facilities for its residents.

The gated community is a concept that emerged in response to the rise of safety and security issues, and offers more advantages in terms of a calm environment and enhanced safety that is ideal for family development.

=== Mauritius ===
Several gated communities now exist on the island of Mauritius since the government introduced Integrated Resort Schemes (IRS) and Real Estate Schemes (RES) in the mid-1990s. Recently they have been amalgamated into Property Development Schemes (PDS). The government also introduced Smart City permits and in 2016 it secured the assistance of Saudi Arabia to launch the government's version of a gated Smart City known as Heritage City Project which was proposed at Minissy, in the region of Ebène, with the assistance of Saudi Arabia.

=== Mexico ===
Gated communities in Mexico are a result of the huge income gap existing in the country. A 2008 study found that the average income in an urban area of Mexico was $26,654, a rate higher than advanced regions like Spain or Greece while the average income in rural areas (sometimes just a short distance away) was only $8,403. This close a proximity of wealth and poverty has created a large security risk for Mexico's middle class. Gated communities can be found in virtually every medium and large-sized city in Mexico with the largest found in major cities, such as Monterrey, Mexico City or Guadalajara.

Luxury or "status" gated communities are very popular with middle to high income residents in Mexico. Gated luxury communities in Mexico are considerably cheaper than in countries such as the United States while retaining houses of similar size and quality due to the commonness of the communities and the lower cost to build them and are priced lower to attract middle class residents.

Many gated communities in Mexico have fully independent and self-contained infrastructure, such as schools, water and power facilities, security and fire forces, and medical facilities. Some of the larger gated communities even retain their own school districts and police departments. The Interlomas area of Mexico City contains hundreds of gated communities and is the largest concentration of gated communities in the world, stretching over 140 square kilometres (54 sq mi). The surrounding areas of Santa Fe, Bosques-Lomas, Interlomas-Bosque Real, are also made up predominantly of gated communities and span over 30% of Greater Mexico City.

Many smaller gated communities in Mexico are not officially classified as separate gated communities as many municipal rules prohibit closed off roads. Most of these small neighbourhoods cater to lower middle income residents and offer a close perimeter and check points similar to an "authentic" gated community. This situation is tolerated and sometimes even promoted by some city governments due to the lack of capacity to provide reliable and trusted security forces.

=== New Zealand ===
In New Zealand, gated communities have been developed in suburban areas of the main cities since the 1980s and 1990s.

=== Nigeria ===
Gated communities are widespread in Nigeria, where they are often referred to as housing estates or villas. These estates can cover between 50 and 100 hectares, with one, the Gwarimpa estate, spanning more than a thousand hectares. Additionally, some of them offer amenities like schools, daycares, gyms, playgrounds, supermarkets and parks. In urban centers like Lagos, Lagos Island, and Abuja, a number of estates are luxury estates catering exclusively to Nigeria's upper class, including politicians, government officials, CEOs, and celebrities. In contrast, there are also more affordable estates which target Nigeria's middle class.

Gated communities appeal to Nigerians primarily because of the exclusivity and sense of security they provide. Many estates have tightly controlled entrances, ensuring that unauthorized or unfamiliar individuals cannot gain access.

Another form of gated community common in Nigeria is the quarters, typically developed and reserved for employees of a particular organization and their families. For example, many Nigerian universities, including the University of Ibadan have staff quarters. These staff quarters are usually located within or near the organization's premises.

=== Pakistan ===
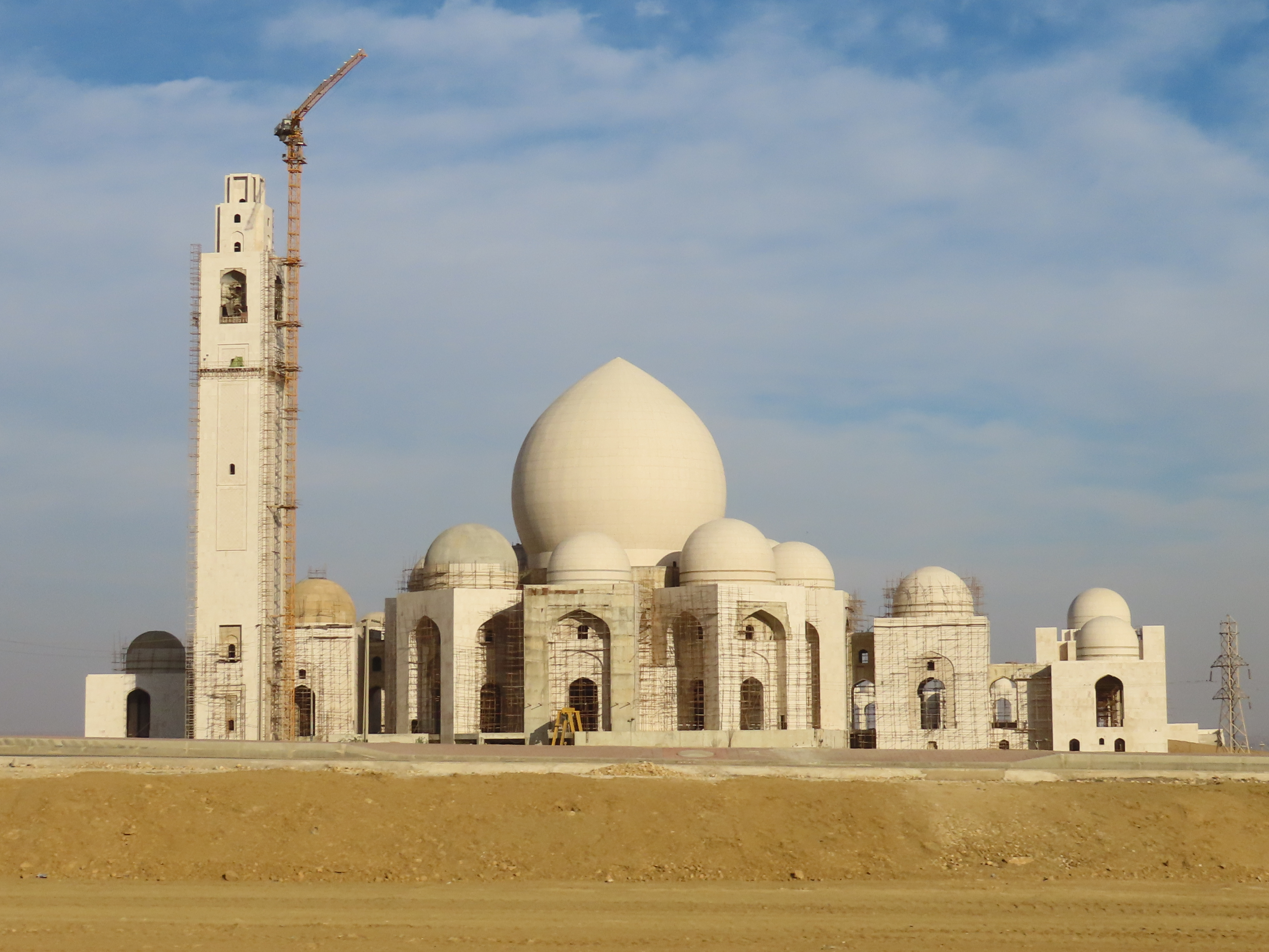
View of the Grand Jamia Mosque in Bahria Town Karachi

Pakistan has a very large number of gated communities, most of which target middle class Pakistanis. The largest being Bahria Town, which is also the largest in Asia and has communities in major cities. Defence Housing Authority is also a major developer of gated communities.

Others include WAPDA Town, Gulberg, Islamabad and Schon Properties, while Emaar Properties also maintains several gated communities in the country targeting primarily upper class people. Gated communities in Pakistan are mostly immune from problems of law enforcement and lack of energy faced by the majority of the other housing societies. In a short time, the property prices in such communities have greatly increased – in 2007 a 20-square-meter house in Bahria Town, Lahore cost around four million Pakistani rupees ($40,000); a similar property in 2012 costed nine million rupees, while houses are priced around 100-300 million rupees. The Bahria Town of Karachi is currently constructing Rafi Cricket Stadium, when completed will be the largest stadium in the country and Grand Jamia Mosque, when completed will be the largest in South Asia and third-largest in the world.

=== Peru ===
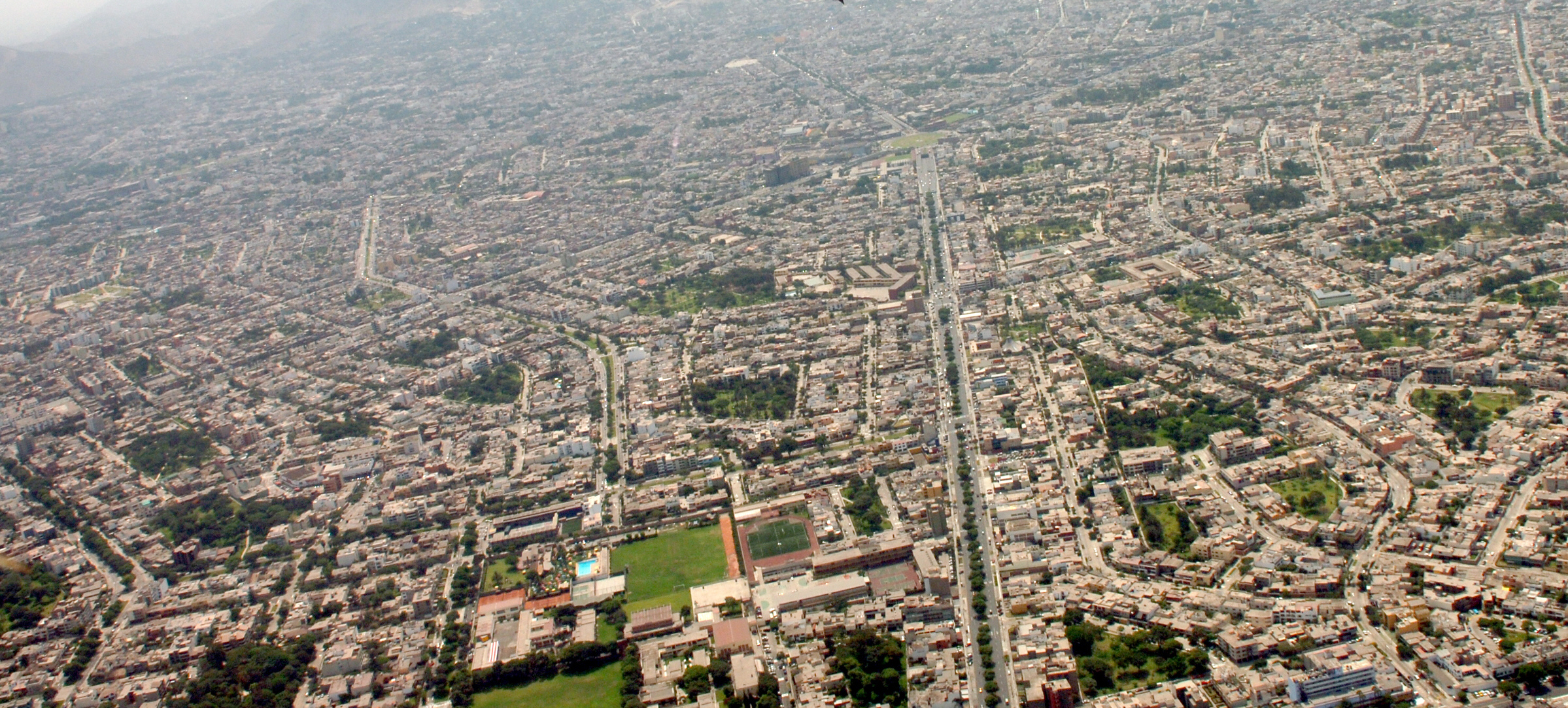
Aerial view of the Santiago de Surco middle class gated community of Lima, Peru

Lima, Peru has several gated communities, especially in the wealthy districts of La Molina and Santiago de Surco. They are home to many prominent Peruvians.

=== Philippines ===
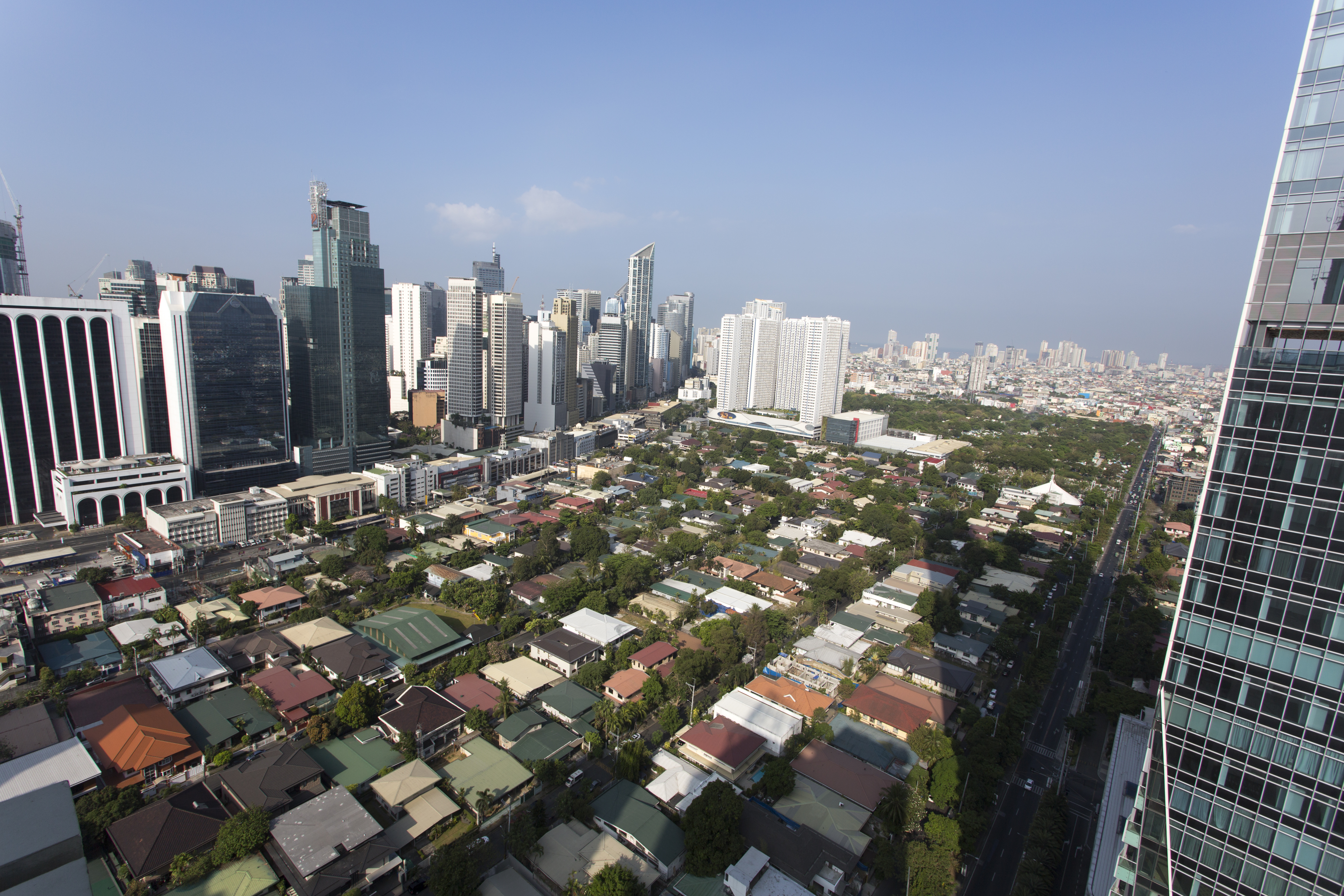
View of executive gated community Bel-Air Village Phase II, Makati city, Philippines

The Philippines has a large number of gated communities which are known in Philippine English as "subdivisions" or "villages". Gated communities represent one of the main residency types for upper and middle class Filipinos up and down the country, along with condominiums. Regardless of their names, such communities may either form part of a larger barangay (village), or constitute a single barangay in and of themselves. Gated communities are often grouped by the phase of build, or by project number, and homes within these communities are designated with a lot and block number on a street as opposed to conventional house numbers or building names. Gated communities are divided between two types:

1. Executive subdivisions/villages: Along with condominiums, these are the residential neighbourhoods of the wealthiest in Philippine society. Examples of these include Forbes Park, Bel-Air, Greenwoods Executive Villages, Magallanes village, Dasmarinas Village and Ayala Alabang village.
2. Subdivisions/villages: Gated communities targeted to the Philippine middle classes. These may begin with a name and end with a number E.g. "Kalayaan Village 3", the 3 designating that it is the third subdivision project for the land development company under the "Kalayaan" homes project. Examples of subdivisions include BF Homes, Camella Homes, among a majority of wealthier suburban areas.

=== Russia ===
Aerobus live complex is the de facto first gated community in Moscow. Business center is in this complex but outside the residential area.

Potapovo (known as New Moscow, but developed with North Butovo to RAS members) - known as fenced Kommunarka-Butovo road between 1994-2000 and Moscow had to build another road. Service company has bus license and guard wearing uniform is always in a bus (not usual even in strict restricted access). Later they opened trade center but neither allowed to cut the corner or use 2 entrances (from northbound). Fence lowers effectiveness of bus routes and direct or loop extension of line 12. This area set to order bus on demand but taxis ordered to remain outside.

Ozero is a cooperative formed around Vladimir Putin's dacha on Lake Komsomolskoe (Finnish: Kiimajärvi), Priozersky District, Leningrad Oblast.

=== Saudi Arabia ===
In Saudi Arabia, many expatriate workers are required to live in company-provided housing. After the 2003 attack on Al Hambra, Jadawel, Siyanco and Vinell by militant Saudi dissidents, the government established tight military security for those compounds with large western populations. Many western individuals also reside in the many other gated compounds or non-gated villas and apartments in the cities that they work. Saudi Aramco provides a compound in Dhahran which is one of the largest of its kind within Saudi Arabia. Gated communities are also popular with many Saudis, which accounts for the limited availability of open villas in these communities and the premium rent paid for that housing. These compounds can be found in many of Saudi Arabia's cities, including but not limited to Abha, Dhahran, Riyadh, and Taif.

=== Singapore ===
Sentosa Cove is the only gated residential community in Singapore, containing 350 bungalows on a 99-year leasehold term. It is the only landed housing that can be purchased by non-citizens. Despite this, as of 2021, the properties transact at a lower price to comparable areas on the mainland.

=== South Africa ===
South Africa has an increasing number of gated communities, where the wealthy sometimes live in close proximity to the urban poor (yet with little contact between the two).

=== Thailand ===
Many housing estates in Thailand take the form of gated communities, targeted to the upper and middle classes. They may be managed by the development company or by resident committees.

Gated communities are often referred to as mubans in Thailand.

=== Turkey ===
Turkey has several gated communities, especially in Istanbul and Ankara. Called "kapalı site" in Turkish, they are mostly located around the edge of the city.

=== United Arab Emirates ===
In the United Arab Emirates, gated communities have exploded in popularity, particularly in Dubai, where the 2002 decision to allow foreigners to own freehold properties has resulted in the construction of numerous such communities built along various themes. Examples include The Lakes, Springs, Meadows, and Arabian Ranches.

=== United Kingdom ===
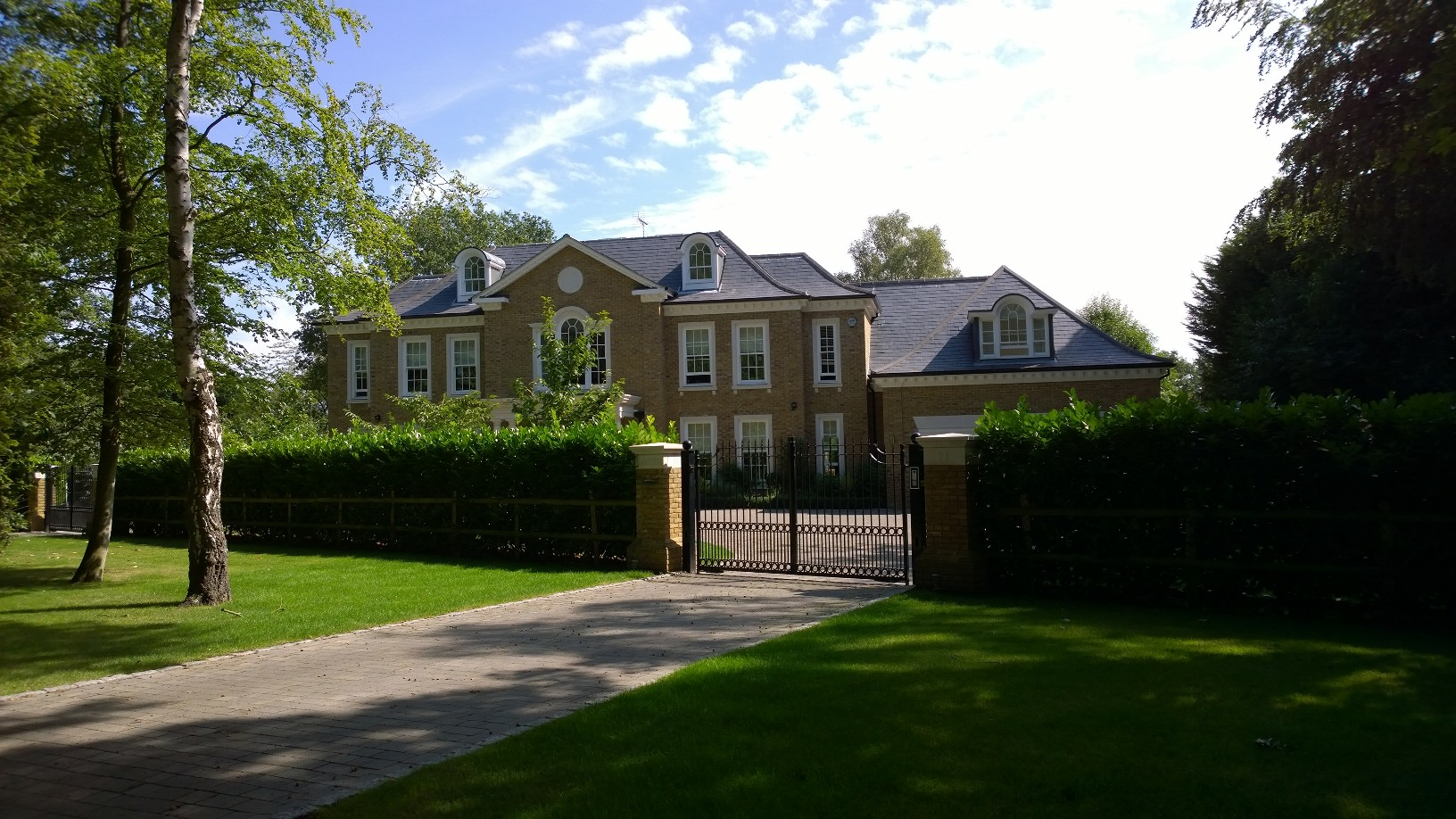
A gated house in Burwood Park

Gated communities were established in the late 1920s in response to the increasing crime rates in cities. The first gated community was established in 1928 by John Galsworthy on the outskirts of London.

In the United Kingdom, gated communities are relatively rare. In 2004 there were an estimated 1,000 such communities in England (i.e. not including Scotland, Wales and Northern Ireland). As of 2002, the majority of these communities were found to be in the South East and most were small developments; only four local authorities had one or more gated communities with over 300 dwellings. They generally consisted of a gated street of up to 60 or 100 houses, or a single block of flats.

The bulk of gated communities in the United Kingdom have been constructed by private developers, with smaller proportions built by social landlords and through public-private partnerships. Research has found that they typically exist within surrounding areas that are also highly affluent, if not necessarily gated. It has been noted that as far as buyer motivation is concerned, issues of security, exclusivity and prestige were often subsumed by a desire to obtain property that would maintain its value. Although the appeal of these communities is said to be mainly be to "young affluent singles" and older couples, this varies significantly according to location and the availability of accommodation types. Unlike in America, marketing materials rarely refer to any community aspect of living in a gated development.

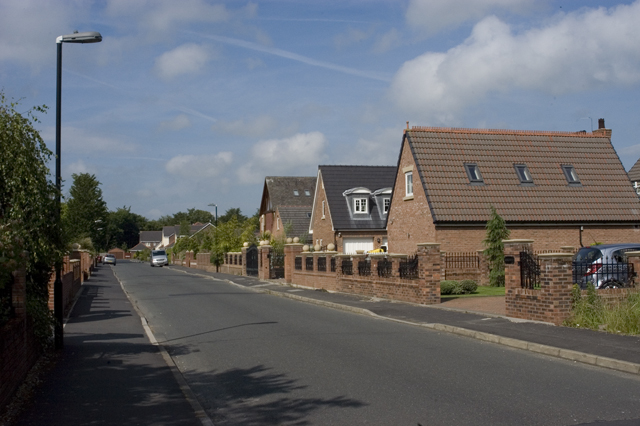
Brockhall Village near Blackburn

There is "considerable diversity in terms of the built form" of gated communities. In London, many new-build and converted spaces that have been turned into gated communities consist largely of flats and are therefore unlikely to be suitable for families. The redevelopment of these inner city sites for "secure, upscale, condominium-style housing in central London" was partly fuelled by a cultural shift among young professionals towards "loft-living" in the city centre. Examples from London include the Docklands developments of New Caledonian Wharf, Kings and Queen Wharf and Pan Peninsula, and East London locations like the Bow Quarter in Bow.

Outside London, gated communities tend to be more spacious. The most prestigious gated communities, or "private estates", are generally seen as being those around the fringes of London; these include the large estates at St George's Hill and Wentworth, both of which are in Surrey. In general, there is a heavy concentration around Surrey's Cobham-Esher-Weybridge triangle – examples are Burwood Park and Kingswood Warren, while Blackhills and Clare Hill represent smaller competitors with somewhat lower property values. In suburban Kent, Keston Park and Farnborough Park are most notable.

=== United States ===
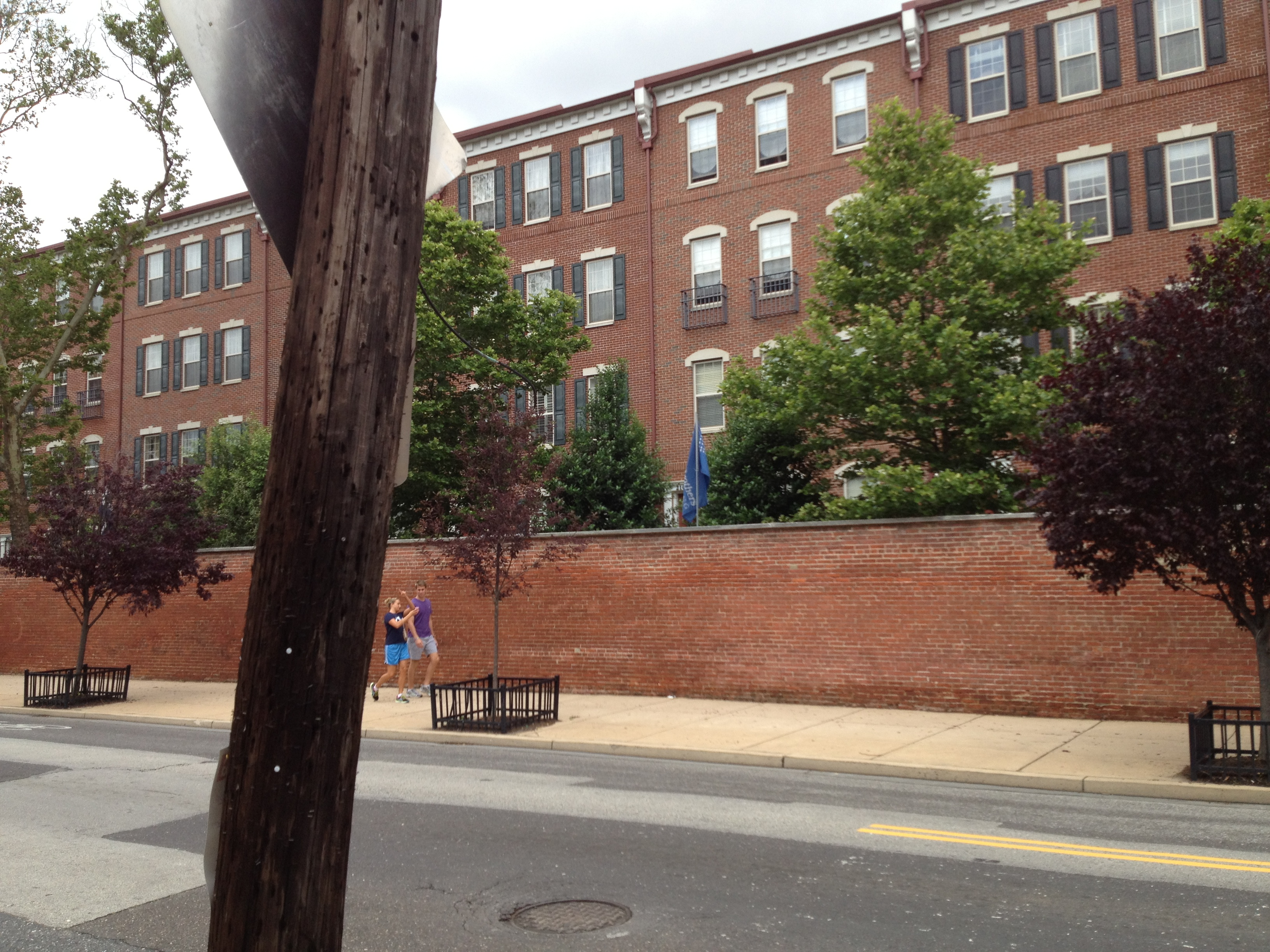
Brick wall separating Naval Square from Grays Ferry Avenue in Philadelphia

The earliest American gated communities date to the 1850s, though it was in the early 1900s when they first began to proliferate. Most gated communities are today located in the Sun Belt region in the South and West, where there is more land available for development. They are usually developed privately and for this reason it is difficult to determine the total number. Although they are often unincorporated, there are numerous incorporated gated cities in Southern California, namely Bradbury, Canyon Lake, Hidden Hills, Laguna Woods, and Rolling Hills.

In 2002, USA Today reported that approximately 40% of new builds in California were behind walls. By 1997, an estimated 20,000 gated communities had been built across the country. That year, estimates of the number of people in gated communities ranged from 4 million in 30,000 communities up to around 8 million. This growth continued and by 2009 figures from the American Housing Survey indicated that the number of people living in gated communities had risen to 11 million households. Setha Low, a psychologist who has studied gated communities and their residents, suggested this was likely an underestimate.

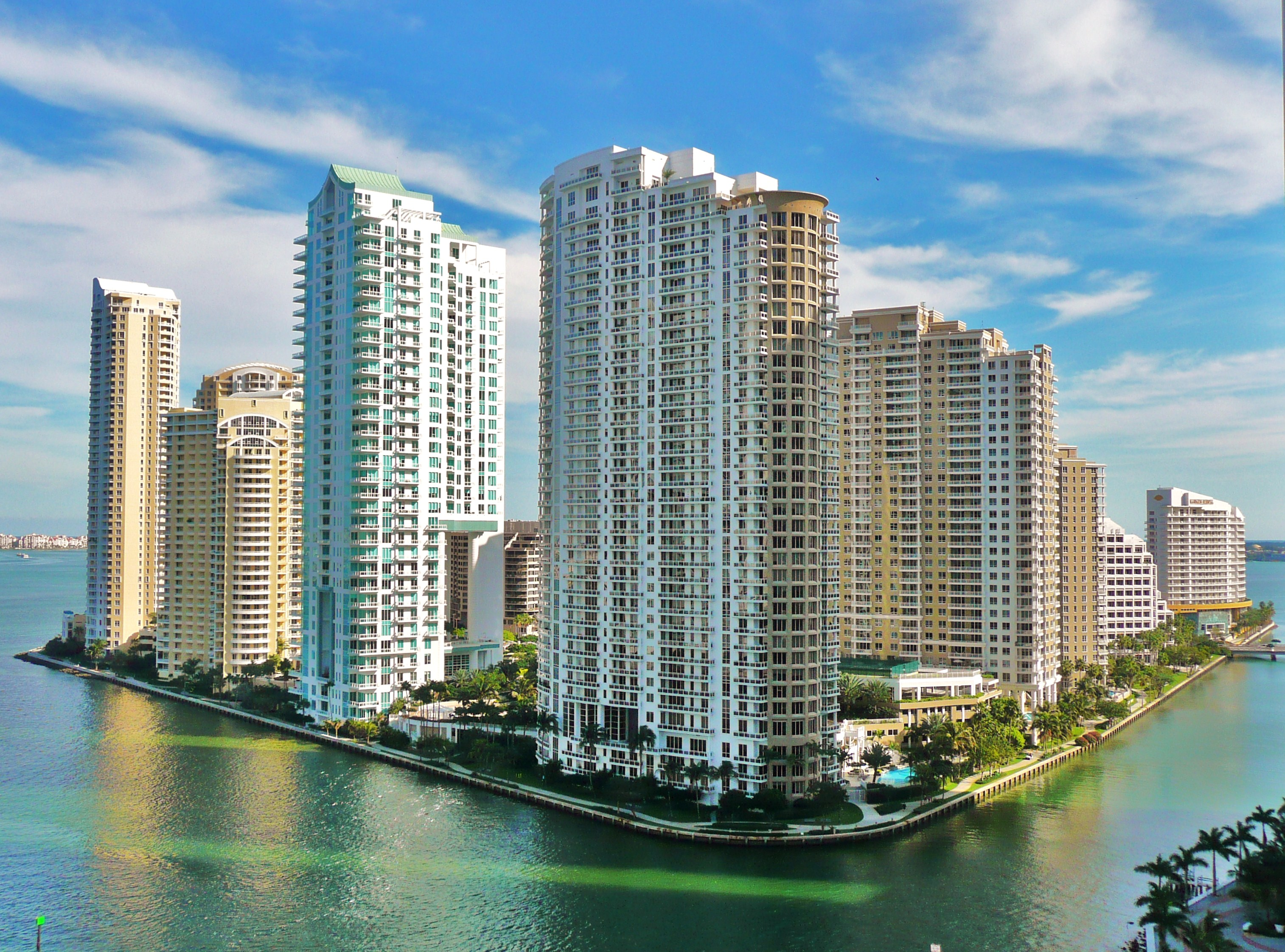
Brickell Key in Miami

The notion that gated communities in the United States are "bastions of affluence" has been challenged by academic research. A 2005 study published in the Journal of Planning Education and Research revealed they often contain both owner-occupied and renter-occupied properties and that socioeconomic status and income levels can vary significantly across communities. Criminologists Nicholas Branic and Charis Kubrin have argued that the "affluent, high socioeconomic status gated communities" of popular imagination in fact represent just one type of gated community.

Ed Blakely distinguishes between "prestige communities" of the rich and socially distinguished and "security zones", in which safety is the main goal. Nevertheless, much of the literature points to gated communities as contributing to greater social seclusion and segregation. Common motivations for moving into them are fear of crime and a desire to escape demographic change — gated communities are generally ethnically homogenous. Alternatively, a 2015 Urban Studies article argued that while gated communities in the southwestern United States entrenched social segregation, no effect was present for racial segregation, as the streets they bordered tended to already be segregated on a racial level.

=== Uruguay ===
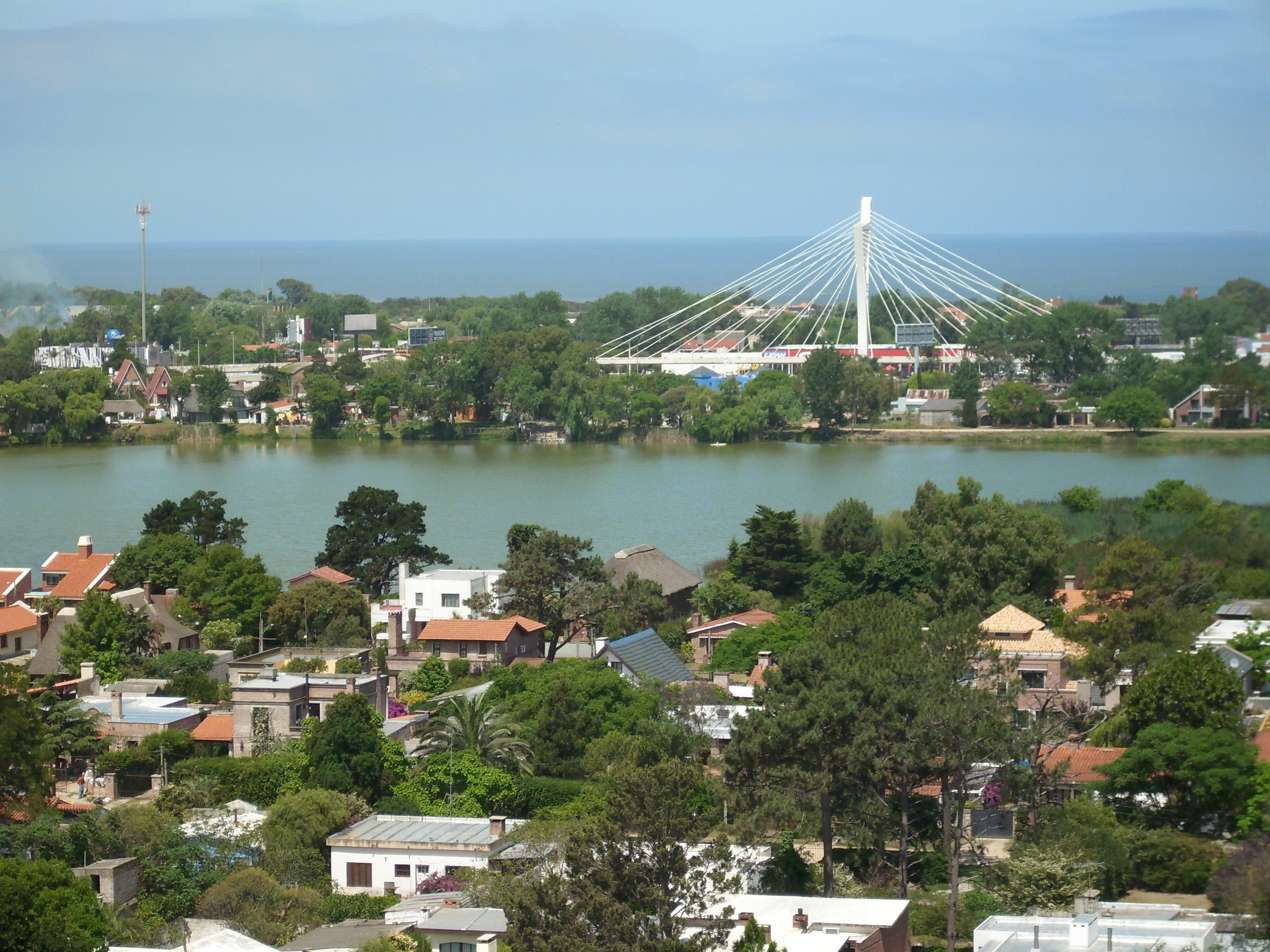
Several gated communities in Uruguay are adjacent to Ciudad de la Costa

Gated communities in Uruguay are known locally as 'barrios privados' or private neighbourhoods. There is no official data on how widespread gated communities in Uruguay are, but by 2013 at least 20 were known to exist in the Maldonado Department, seven in the Canelones Department, seven in Rocha, one in Soriano, and two in Rio Negro. Gated communities had experienced "huge growth" by 2020, and were a popular choice for foreigners with families, although rental returns are reportedly low and the properties will not necessarily appreciate in value. While socially exclusive areas exist in the capital Montevideo, such as the Carrasco barrio, the closing of streets is not permitted and attempts to build gated communities within the city limits have been refused.

Contrary to what might be assumed, research has found that gated communities in this country do not increase residential segregation as they select for affluent people who already experience a high degree of segregation. These residents tend to be a very homogenous group in age, family stage, and social class. La Tahona and Carmel are two of the most prominent gated communities located just outside Montevideo in the Canelones Department and nearby to the Zonamerica business park and Carrasco International Airport. La Tahona and Carmel both adjoin Camino de los Horneros, a road immediately north of Ciudad de la Costa that connects to multiple gated communities with 2000 homes in total, though these numbers are expected to eventually treble. Numerous gated communities have also been constructed in Punta Del Este.

Demand for gated communities in Uruguay has increased in recent years due to the growing availability of remote working, and amenities like swimming pools can be found more often than in Montevideo. They have also become more accessible to the middle class as pre-designed new builds have become common, as opposed to the older model of requiring individual owners to buy a plot and then hire their own builder. The resulting economies of scale have helped to keep average prices lower than they otherwise would be.

== See also ==
- Age-restricted community
- Barracks
- Castle
- Closed city
- Closed community
- Condominium
- Defensive wall
- Fort
- Homeowners association
- Peace lines
- Planned unit development
- Private community
