= Esquerdinha =

Esquerdinha (Portuguese for "lefty") may refer to:

- Esquerdinha (footballer, born 1924), full name William Kepler Santa Rosa, Brazilian footballer
- Esquerdinha (footballer, born 1972), full name José Araújo, Brazilian footballer
- Esquerdinha (footballer, born 1980), full name Glasner da Silva Albuquerque, Brazilian footballer
- Esquerdinha (footballer, born January 1984), full name Eduardo Souza Reis, Brazilian footballer
- Esquerdinha (footballer, born April 1984), full name Gilvan Gomes Vieira, Brazilian footballer
- Esquerdinha (footballer, born 1989), full name Rubens Raimundo da Silva, Brazilian footballer
- Esquerdinha (footballer, born 1990), full name Francisco Lisvaldo Daniel Duarte, Brazilian footballer
- Esquerdinha (footballer, born 1992), full name Victor de Almeida Sandes, Brazilian football midfielder
- Esquerdinha (footballer, born 2006), full name João Henrique Mendes da Silva, Brazilian football defender.

== See also ==
- Left-footer
