= Albuquerque (surname) =

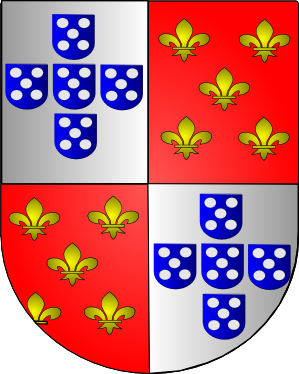
- Coat of arms associated to Albuquerque surname

Origin
- Region of origin: Portugal

Albuquerque (Portuguese pronunciation: [alβuˈkɛɾkɨ]) is a common Portuguese surname, which may refer to:

- Afonso de Albuquerque (1453–1515), a Portuguese fidalgo and naval general officer
- Benedito Francisco de Albuquerque (born 1928), Brazilian Roman Catholic bishop
- Cássio Albuquerque dos Anjos (born 1980), a Brazilian goalkeeper
- Catarina de Albuquerque (1970–2025), Portuguese lawyer and human rights activist
- Felipe Albuquerque (born 1999), Brazilian footballer
- Filipe Albuquerque (born 1985), Portuguese race car driver
- Hermenegildo Portocarrero, Baron of Forte de Coimbra (1818–1893), Brazilian nobleman and military officer, marshal in the Brazilian Army
- João Pessoa Cavalcânti de Albuquerque (1878–1930), the governor of Paraíba, Brazil between 1928 and 1930
- Joaquim Arcoverde de Albuquerque Cavalcanti (1850–1930), Brazilian Roman Catholic prelate, the first cardinal to be born in the Americas
- Joaquim Augusto Mouzinho de Albuquerque (1855–1902), Portuguese soldier
- João Albuquerque (born 1986), Portuguese politician
- José Albuquerque (born 1975), Brazilian boxer
- José Paulino de Almeida e Albuquerque (?–1830), Brazilian military and politician
- Lita Albuquerque, US environmental artist, painter and sculptor
- Luís da Silva Mouzinho de Albuquerque (1792–1846), Portuguese military officer, engineer, poet, scientist and politician
- Marcos Venâncio de Albuquerque (born 1980), Brazilian footballer
- Mike de Albuquerque (born 1947), English musician
- Oscar Albuquerque (born 1954), former Canadian soccer midfielder
- Renato de Albuquerque, Brazilian civil engineer and entrepreneur in the construction and real state businesses
- Roberto Albuquerque (born 1993), American soccer player
- Glasner da Silva Albuquerque (born 1980), known as Esquerdinha Brazilian footballer

== See also ==
- Mouzinho de Albuquerque (disambiguation)
