= Renato de Albuquerque =

Brazilian civil engineer

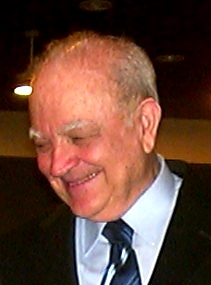

Renato de Albuquerque is a Brazilian civil engineer and entrepreneur in the construction and real estate businesses. He was cofounder of a pioneering construction firm, Albuquerque & Takaoka, in 1951 alongside fellow architect and friend Yojiro Takaoka.

== Early life and education ==
Both Albuquerque and Takaoka studied at the University of São Paulo Polytechnic School, graduating in 1949.

== Career in business ==
Together with Takaoka, Albuquerque is responsible for the creation of the first vertical and the first horizontal walled condominiums in Brazil. The Alphaville concept was widely copied throughout Brazil and is a very successful enterprise, currently with more than 20 locations in Brazil and Portugal. In October 2006, Alphaville was purchased by Gafisa S.A.

Albuquerque is also the editor-in-chief of the Alpha Magazine and president of the Alphaville Foundation, a charity and not-for-profit NGO.

== Albuquerque Foundation ==
Albuquerque has amassed more than 2,600 pieces, making it the world’s largest private collection of Ming and Qing dynasty ceramics made for export as well as works made for the imperial court.

Since 2025, the collection has been exhibited in the former family home in Sintra, where the Albuquerque Foundation also organizes temporary exhibitions of contemporary ceramics and offers artists’ residencies. After a redesign by the Brazilian architecture firm Bernardes Arquitetura, it includes a pavilion for exhibitions, a restaurant, a shop, a garden and a library. The foundation’s exhibition program opened with an inaugural show by Theaster Gates.

== Recognition ==
Albuquerque is an honorary citizen of Campinas and Barueri.
