= Esquerdinha (footballer, born January 1984) =

Brazilian footballer

Personal information
- Full name: Eduardo Souza Reis
- Date of birth: 9 January 1984 (age 42)
- Place of birth: Montanha, Brazil
- Height: 1.69 m (5 ft 7 in)
- Position: Attacking midfielder

Team information
- Current team: River

Senior career*
Years	Team	Apps	(Gls)
2003–2005	Fluminense		
2004	→ Inter de Bebedouro (loan)		
2005	→ Bahia (loan)		
2006	Cabofriense		
2006–2007	Paysandu		
2007–2008	Vihren		
2009	Brasil de Pelotas		
2010–2011	Veranópolis		
2011	Nacional-MG		
2011	Boa Esporte		
2012	Uberlândia		
2013	Itumbiara		
2013	Anapolina		
2014	Paulista		
2014	Guarani		
2014–	River		
- * Club domestic league appearances and goals as of 31 December 2011

Eduardo Souza Reis or simply Esquerdinha (born 9 January 1984, in Montanha) is a Brazilian footballer who plays as a midfielder.
