= Alburquerque =

Alburquerque may refer to:

== People ==
- Al Alburquerque (born 1986), Dominican professional baseball player
- Beatrice, Countess of Alburquerque (1347/1351–1381), daughter of Portuguese King Peter I and a Castilian noblewoman
- Duke of Alburquerque, a Spanish aristocratic title
- Eleanor of Alburquerque (1374–1435), Queen consort of Aragon by her marriage to Ferdinand I of Aragon
- Rafael Alburquerque (born 1940), former vice president of the Dominican Republic
- Sancho Alfonso, 1st Count of Alburquerque (1342–1375), illegitimate child of King Alfonso XI of Castile

== Places and structures ==
- Alburquerque, Badajoz, a town in Spain
- Alburquerque, Bohol, a municipality in the Philippines

== See also ==
- Alquerque, a board game considered to be the parent of draughts (checkers)
- Albuquerque (disambiguation)
