= El Maamora, Alexandria =

El Maamora المعمورة
- Location in Egypt
- Coordinates: 31.291754°N 30.040884°E
- Country: Egypt
- Governorate: Alexandria
- City: Alexandria
- Time zone: UTC+2 (EET)
  - Summer (DST): UTC+3 (EEST)

El Maamora (Arabic: المعمورة) is a neighborhood in Alexandria, Egypt.

== See also ==
- Neighborhoods in Alexandria
- El Maamora Beach
