= Cayos de Albuquerque =

Uninhabited Colombian Islands in the Caribbean

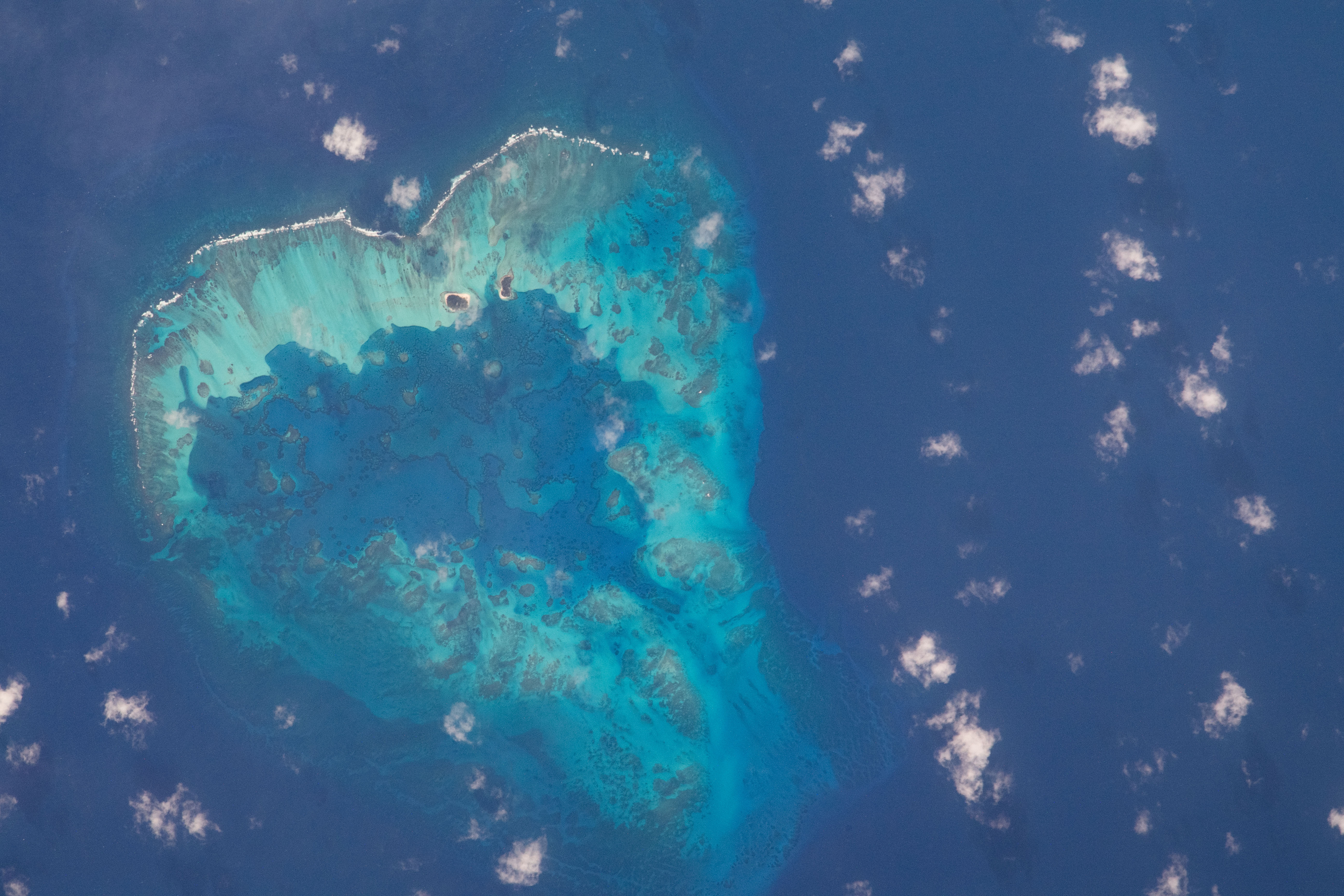
- View of Cayos de Albuquerque from space, taken during ISS Expedition 65

- Location of Cayos de Albuquerque within San Andrés and Providencia

Geography
- Location: Caribbean
- Coordinates: 12°10′N 81°51′W
- Width: 8 km (5 mi)

Administration
- Colombia
- Department: San Andrés and Providencia

Demographics
- Population: 0

The Cayos de Albuquerque, also known as the Cayos de Alburquerque (Note: It is called "Albuquerque" or "Alburquerque" interchangeably. On the maps of the Colombian Geographic Institute Agustín Codazzi and other organizations like the Colombian Ocean Commission (Comisión Colombiana del Océano) and the Geology Bulletin (Boletín de Geología) it appears as Alburquerque, but in documents and pages of the official ministries it appears as Albuquerque, such as in the Colombian Ministry of Science, Invemar, or the Information System on Marine Biodiversity (Sistema de Información sobre Biodiversidad Marina).) and the Cayos del Sur-suroeste, are an atoll in the Caribbean Sea belonging to the Archipelago of San Andrés, Providencia and Santa Catalina of Colombia. It is situated 37 kilometres (23 mi) southwest of San Andrés and 190 kilometres (120 mi) east of Nicaragua.

== Characteristics ==
The atoll is the only island of the archipelago to have a circular shape, its diameter in the east-west direction being approximately 8 km. In the same direction, it consists of a windward pre-reef terrace, a lagoon, a lagoon terrace and a leeward pre-reef terrace.

Albuquerque has two islands formed by accumulations of sediments on the lagoon terrace. The largest is called the North Cay and currently serves as a military post for the Colombian Navy. The dominant kinds of vegetation on the island are coconut palms, some species of rubber trees (Ficus sp.), and low shrubs (Scaevola, Tournefortia); bordering the leeward coast there is a meadow of marine phanerogams largely dominated by Thalassia testudinum. The South Cay island is separated from the north by a shallow channel around 400 meters wide and is densely vegetated by rubber trees.

The Caribbean Current is the predominant, and the surrounding waters are transparent oceanic with low nutrient inputs and constant salinity (between 34 % and 36.3 %). The average temperature and salinity in the area is 27.5 °C (81.5 °F) and 36.35 % respectively.

== See also ==
- Geography of Colombia
- List of Caribbean islands

== Notes ==
1. It is called "Albuquerque" or "Alburquerque" interchangeably. On the maps of the Colombian Geographic Institute Agustín Codazzi and other organizations like the Colombian Ocean Commission (Comisión Colombiana del Océano) and the Geology Bulletin (Boletín de Geología) it appears as Alburquerque, but in documents and pages of the official ministries it appears as Albuquerque, such as in the Colombian Ministry of Science, Invemar, or the Information System on Marine Biodiversity (Sistema de Información sobre Biodiversidad Marina).
