= Albuquerque Mendes =

Portuguese artist

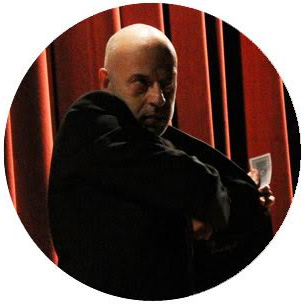
Albuquerque Mendes in 2015

Albuquerque Mendes (born 1953) is a Portuguese artist. He works in the fields of painting, performance art and installation.

== Life and work ==
Mendes was born in 1953 in Trancoso, Portugal. A founding member of the Grupo Puzzle he established, with Gerardo Burmester, the Espaco Lusitano in Porto, an exhibition space for young Portuguese artists in the mid-1980s. In recent years, his work has been shown in museums and galleries in Brazil.

His performances draw on the processions and events that are part of Portuguese popular culture. His paintings include self-portraits, portraits of girls and soldiers, groups of nuns, flowers, landscapes and sexually explicit scenes. In the 1990s his work became more abstract.

He has exhibited with Nelson Leirner at the Valecian Institute of Modern Art. His work is held in the collection of the Berardo Museum, and Serralves.

== Solo exhibitions (selected) ==
- "Paradoxos Degenerados: Entre ações, Pensamento e Obras", Carpe Diem Arte e Pesquisa Lisbon, Portugal (2014)
- "Festim", Galeria Graça Brandão Lisbon, Portugal (2013)
- "den dag manden faldt ned fra himlen i Danmark", Galeria Nuno Centeno Porto, Portugal (2012)
- "Eu tenho 58 anos e isso não quer dizer nada", Galeria Graça Brandão Lisbon, Portugal (2011)
- "Trancoso, 17 de Marco de 1953", Galeria de Arte do Teatro Municipal da Guarda Guarda, Portugal (2011)
- "Making of / La Creazione", Igreja de Santo António dos Portugueses Roma, Itália (2010)
- "O Tempo de Uma Vida", Galeria Graça Brandão, Lisbon, Portugal (2006)
- "Natureza e Crueldade", MAC de Niterói, Rio de Janeiro, Brasil (2005)
- "Natureza e Crueldade", Galeria Graça Brandão, Porto, Portugal (2004)
- "Mar, Mãe, Sal, Sol", Casa Museu Nogueira da Silva, Braga e Casa Municipal de Cultura, Cantanhede, Portugal (2002)
- "Estrela Polar", Galeria Brito Cimino, São Paulo, Brasil (202)
- "Confesso", Exposição Antológica, Museu de Arte Contemporânea de Serralves, Porto, Portugal (2001)
- "Lágrimas" – Galeria Anna Maria Niemeyer, Rio de Janeiro, Brasil (2000)
- "Salomé" – Galeria Lídia Cruz, Leiria, Portugal (2000)
- Galeria Canvas, Porto, Portugal (1999)
- "Via Sacra", Museu de Arte Moderna do Recife e Centro Cultural de João Pessoa, Brasil (1999)
- "O Martírio de São Bartolomeu em Trancoso", Casa Museu Almeida Miranda, Viseu, Portugal e Galeria da Restauração, Porto, Portugal (1998)
- "Ardor", Museu de Arte Moderna da Bahia, São Salvador, Brasil (1998)
- "No jardim das Oliveiras", Galeria Canvas, Porto, Portugal (1997)
- "Com os Olhos na Solidão", Galeria Edicarte, Funchal, Portugal (1997)
- "No mesmo lugar" – Museu da Inconfidência, Ouro Preto, Brasil (1997)
- "Sete Pecados Mortais" – Galeria André Viana, Porto, Portugal (1997)
- Galeria Assírio e Alvim, Lisbon, Portugal (1996)
- "Céus", Paço Imperial, Rio de Janeiro, Brasil (1996)
- Galeria Lídia Cruz, Leiria, Portugal (1994)
- "Aguarelas do Hospital", Casa Museu Nogueira da Silva, Braga, Portugal (1993)
- Casa do Despacho da Ordem de São Francisco, Porto, Portugal (1992)

== Collective exhibitions (selected) ==
- "Grupo PUZZLE (1976-1981) - Pintura Colectiva = Pintura Individual", Centro de Artes e Espectáculos da Figueira da Foz (2011)
- "The Painting and the contexts of history of art" Albuquerque Mendes + Djordje Ozbolt, The Mews Project Space, Londres (2010)
- "Constelações Afectivas II" - Parte 1 e 2, Galeria Graça Brandão, Lisbon, Portugal (2006)
- "Lágrimas", Exposição integrada no aniversário de Inês de Castro, Coimbra, Portugal (2005)
- "Obras Escritas", Biblioteca Almeida Garrett, Porto, Portugal (2003)
- "Os quatro elementos", Casa Municipal de Cultura, Cantanhede, Portugal (2002)
- "O Sangue e as suas metáforas", Teatro do Campo Alegre, Porto, Portugal (2001)
- "O Elogio da Loucura" Hospital Conde Ferreira, Porto, Portugal (2001)
- "Porto 60/70, Os Artistas e a Cidade", Museu de Serralves, Porto, Portugal (2001)
- "A Árvore das Virtudes, a Árvore na Cultura, nas Artes, na Cidade", Biblioteca Almeida Garrett e Coop. Árvore, Porto, Portugal (2001)
- "Arte no Porto no século XX", Biblioteca Almeida Garrett, Porto, Portugal (2001)
- "Arritmias", Mercado Ferreira Borges, Porto, Portugal (2000)
- "III Bienal de Arte da Fundação Cupertino de Miranda de Famalicão", Museu da Guarda, Guarda, Portugal (2000)
- "Accrochage IV", Galeria Canvas, Porto, Portugal (2000)
- "Colecção do MEIAC", Fundação D. Luís I, Cascais, Portugal (2000)
