= Albuquerque & Takaoka =

Brazilian company

Albuquerque & Takaoka is one of the most significant and active architecture, civil engineering, and real estate development private companies of São Paulo, Brazil. It is mostly known for its role in creating the innovative Alphaville concept of business and gated residential condominia.

The firm was founded in 1951 by two young civil engineers, Renato de Albuquerque and Yojiro Takaoka, graduated together in 1949 from Escola Politécnica da Universidade de São Paulo (Polytechnic School), a traditional and respected engineering college in São Paulo. Initially the small firm developed residential houses and small public and commercial buildings, including a church. With the boom of public works in the state, they began working in heavy construction, such as bridges and viaducts, canals, and larger public buildings. The company also built several housing projects for the poor.

In the 1970s, the company diversified into building residential high rises in the city of São Paulo, and created the concept of gated vertical condominia with the first of its kind, "Ilhas do Sul", in 1973. In the succeeding years, it developed the first "Alphaville", in the county of Barueri, and two other luxury condominia, "Aldeia da Serra" (near Alphaville) and "Toque-Toque Pequeno", in the beaches of the Northern coast of the state.

With the death of Yojiro Takaoka, the company changed its name to Albuquerque & Takaoka Participações, Ltda. and the Alphaville projects were passed to Alphaville Urbanismo.
