= Montanha, Espírito Santo =

Municipality of Espírito Santo, Brazil

Montanha
- Municipality of Espírito Santo, Brazil
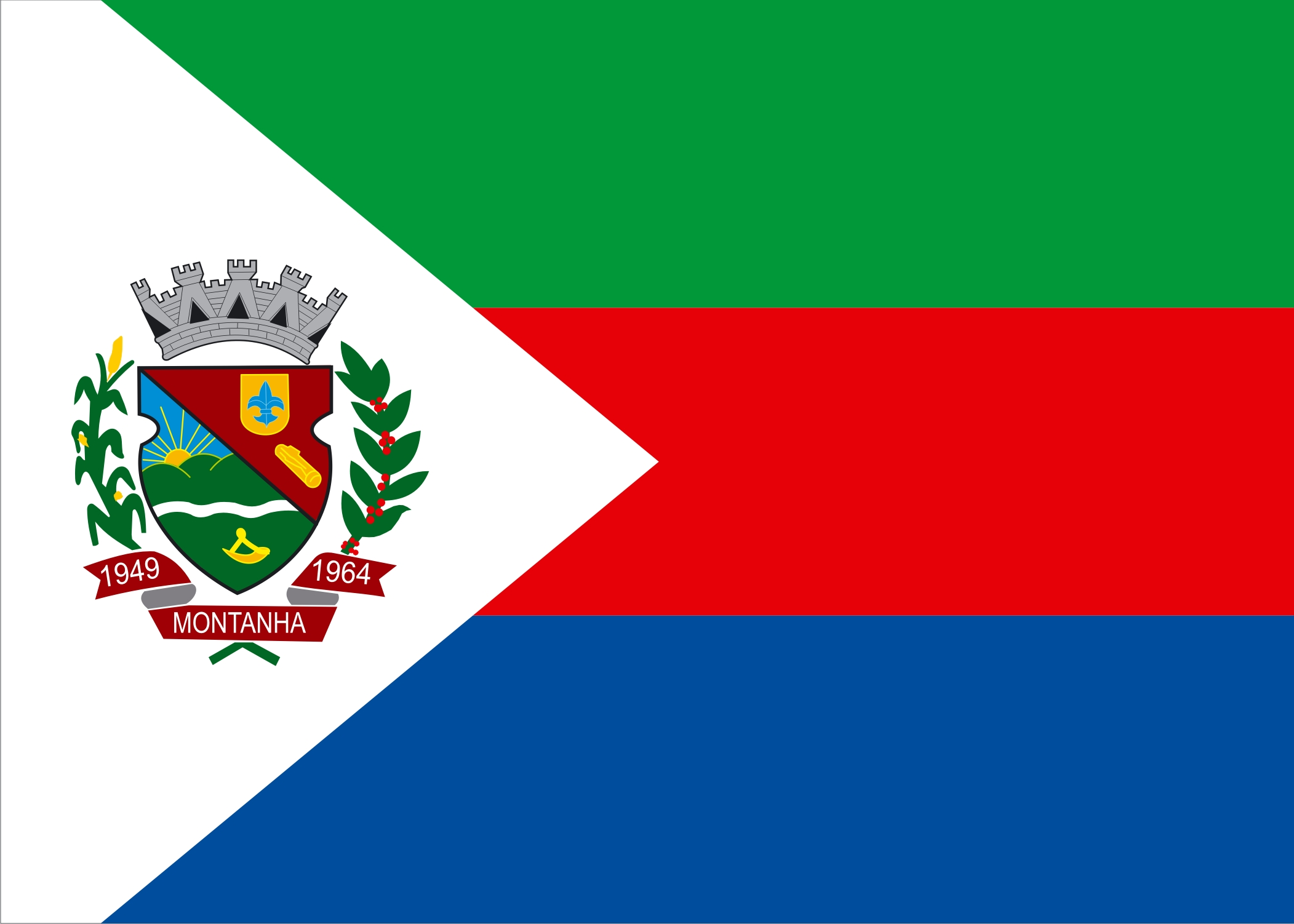
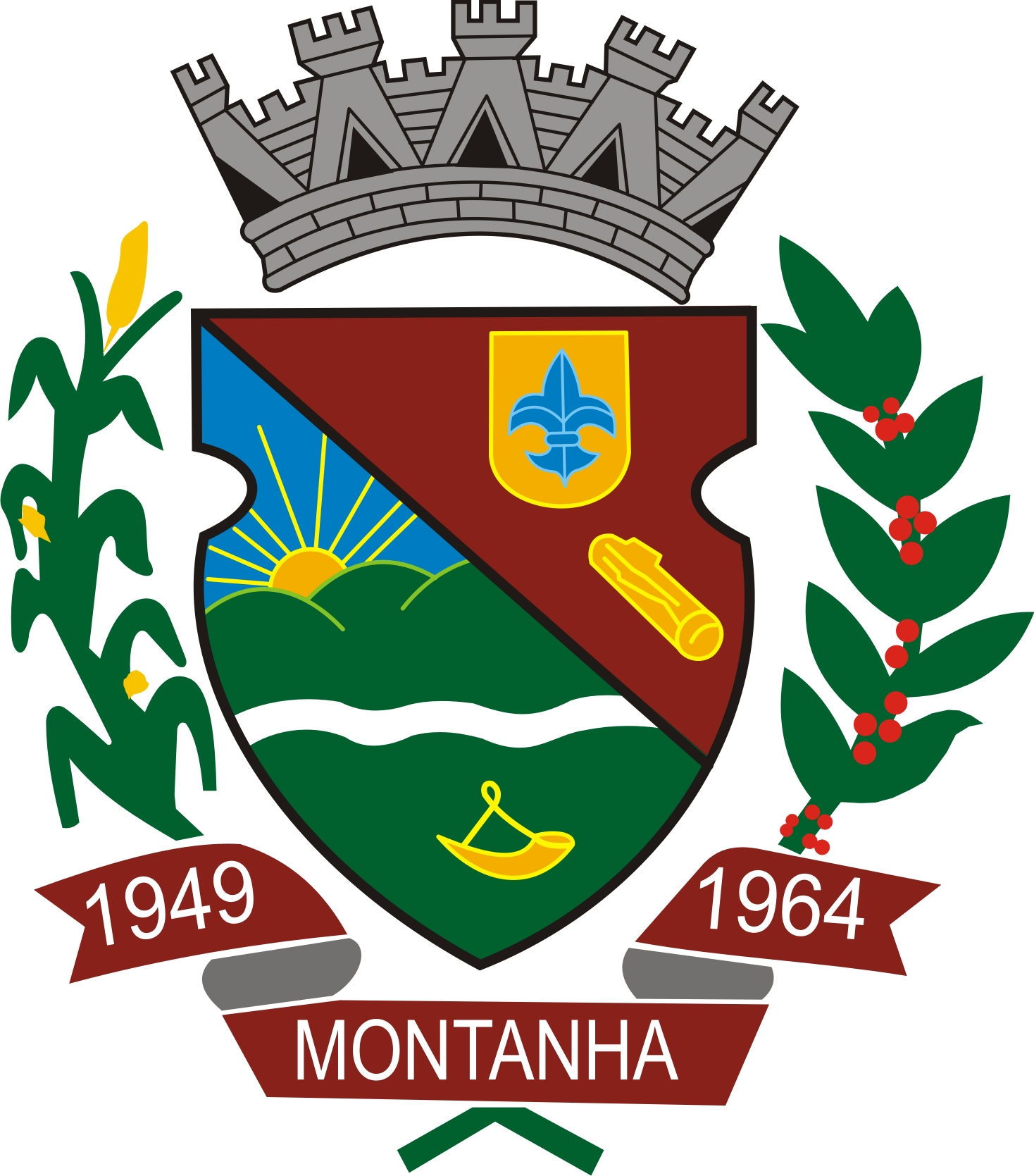
- Flag Coat of arms
- Etymology: Named after a creek
- Location of Montanha in Espírito Santo

- Location within Brazil Location within South America
- Coordinates: 18°7′37″S 40°21′46″W
- Country: Brazil
- Region: Southeast
- State: Espírito Santo
- Founded: 16 April 1964

Government
  - Mayor: Iracy Carvalho Machado Baltar Filha (PODE) (2025-2028)
  - Vice Mayor: Angelo Marcos Cardoso Boldrini (MDB) (2025-2028)

Area
  - Total: 1,099.060 km^{2} (424.349 sq mi)
- Elevation: 180 m (590 ft)

Population (2022)
  - Total: 18,900
  - Density: 17.2/km^{2} (45/sq mi)
- Demonym: Montanhense (Brazilian Portuguese)
- Time zone: UTC-03:00 (Brasília Time)
- Postal code: 29890-000, 29894-000
- HDI (2010): 0.667 – medium
- Website: montanha.es.gov.br

Montanha is a Brazilian municipality in the state of Espírito Santo. Its population was 18,894 (2020) and its area is 1,099 km^{2}. In the Portuguese language, "montanha" means "mountain".

== See also ==
- List of municipalities in Espírito Santo
