= Alphaville, São Paulo =

Real estate development in Brazil

Coordinates: 23°29′30″S 46°50′43″W

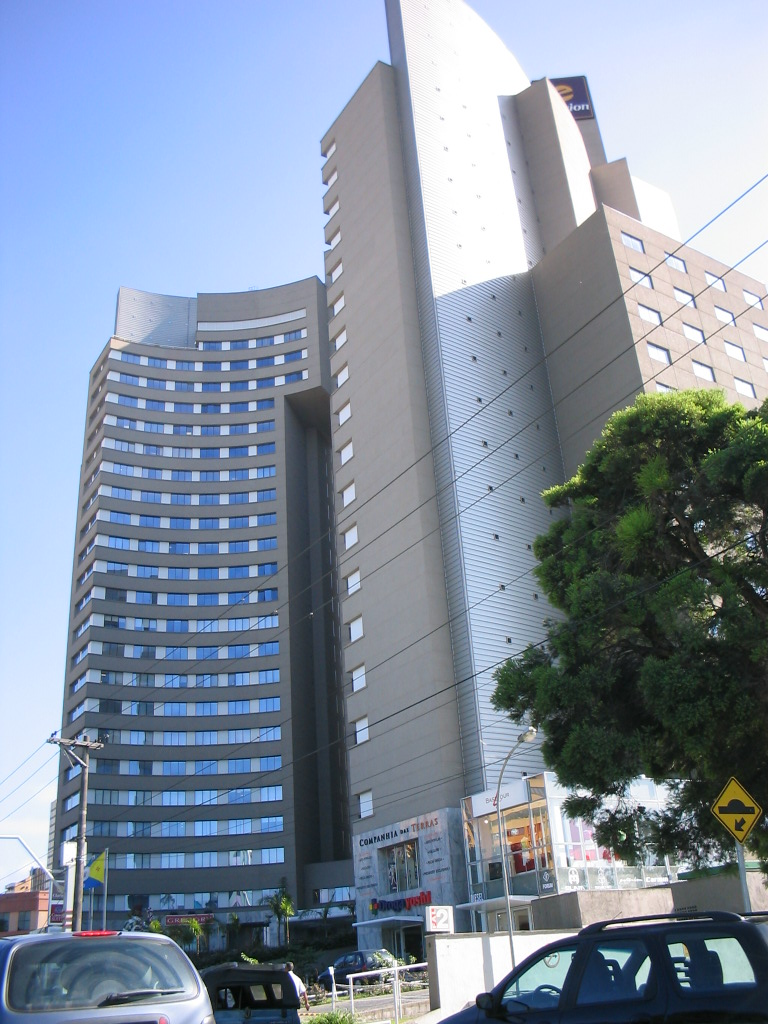
A commercial building in Alphaville Barueri

Alphaville, Barueri (Portuguese pronunciation: [awfaˈvili]) is an affluent district split between the municipalities of Barueri and Santana de Parnaíba metropolitan region of São Paulo. The Alphaville district is a real estate and gated community development in Brazil, constituted by a number of business and residential condominium. The name evokes the "first among cities" concept (ville as French for city and alpha being the first letter of Greek alphabet).

== History ==
The Alphaville concept was created by a building company in São Paulo City, Albuquerque & Takaoka, in the 1970s. The São Paulo megalopolis was beginning to show an upward trend in crime rates, traffic jams, and other forms of urban malaise. Consequently, suburban developments gained popularity, both for modern industrial and commercial ventures, and for wealthy and upper-middle class nouveau riche. The company bought large farm areas in the neighboring counties of Barueri and Santana do Parnaíba and urbanized them. The then-recently built Castelo Branco Highway provided an access to downtown São Paulo. The lots were sold initially for commercial and industrial development, but soon demand for lots for residential purposes arose.

The project was implemented through the sale of lots in the 1970s, initially to owners and executives of companies that were setting up shop there, such as HP, Sadia, Du Pont and Confab. Takaoka's original plan was to build a business center around the Brazilian headquarters of Hewlett Packard, with a commercial center, but later the idea arose to build housing for HP employees, then for employees of other companies and, finally, for anyone else. "The result is that in ten years we built a mini-city," Takaoka told Veja magazine in São Paulo in 1986.

Due to the need for housing for executives of these companies, AlphaVille Residencial was launched in 1975. Thus was born the embryo of the AlphaVille concept of organized occupation. The installation of a multinational changed the concept and even the name of AlphaVille, which changed from AlphaVille Industrial Center to AlphaVille Commercial, Industrial and Business Center.

Over time, it was realized that residential sales were more profitable than business sales, and other residential buildings were built, designated with numbers. The first was called Residential 1, and so on.

== Characteristics ==
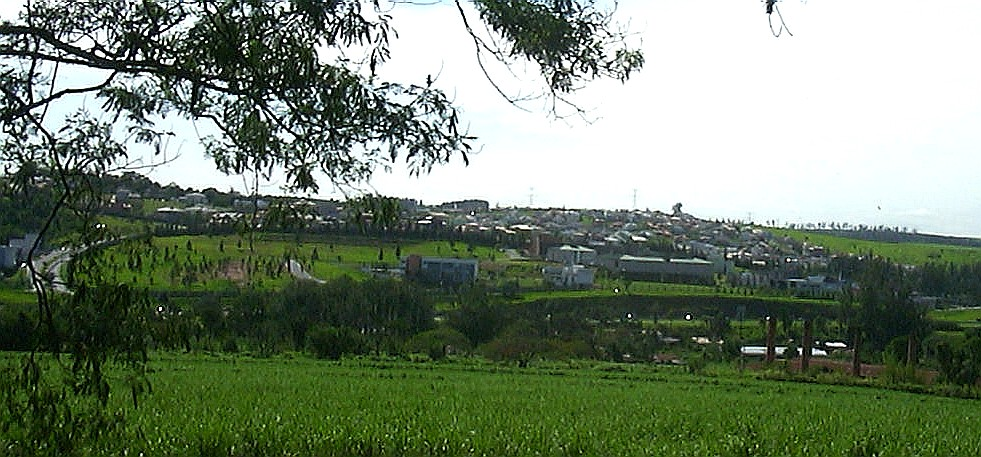
A view of Alphaville Campinas I.

Currently, the original Alphaville site (23 km from São Paulo) has 33 gated areas, with more than 20,000 residences. The business area contains 2,300 businesses, including 11 schools and universities, with a daily movement of more than 150,000 people. Due to the high traffic to and from São Paulo city, the Castelo Branco Highway has been expanded and is now a toll road, with a tolled spur road specifically for Alphaville.

Beginning in the 1990s, the company (now renamed Alphaville Urbanismo), expanded its developments to several other cities in Brazil, such as Aracaju, Brasília, Campinas, São José dos Campos, Ribeirão Preto, Rio de Janeiro, Goiânia, Curitiba, Londrina, Maringá, Salvador, Fortaleza, Belo Horizonte, Natal, Gramado, Manaus, and others, as well as to Portugal (in Cascais). Many of these developments, such as that of Campinas, are also large (1,200 residences, in this case) and have an adjoining business district, with a shopping mall, a hotel, schools, etc.

Other variations of real estate developments by the same company followed, such as Aldeia da Serra, Toque-Toque Pequeno (a beach resort condominium) and Villa Alpha and Alphaville Residential, which sell pre built modular houses.
