= Zonamerica =

Business and Technology park in Uruguay

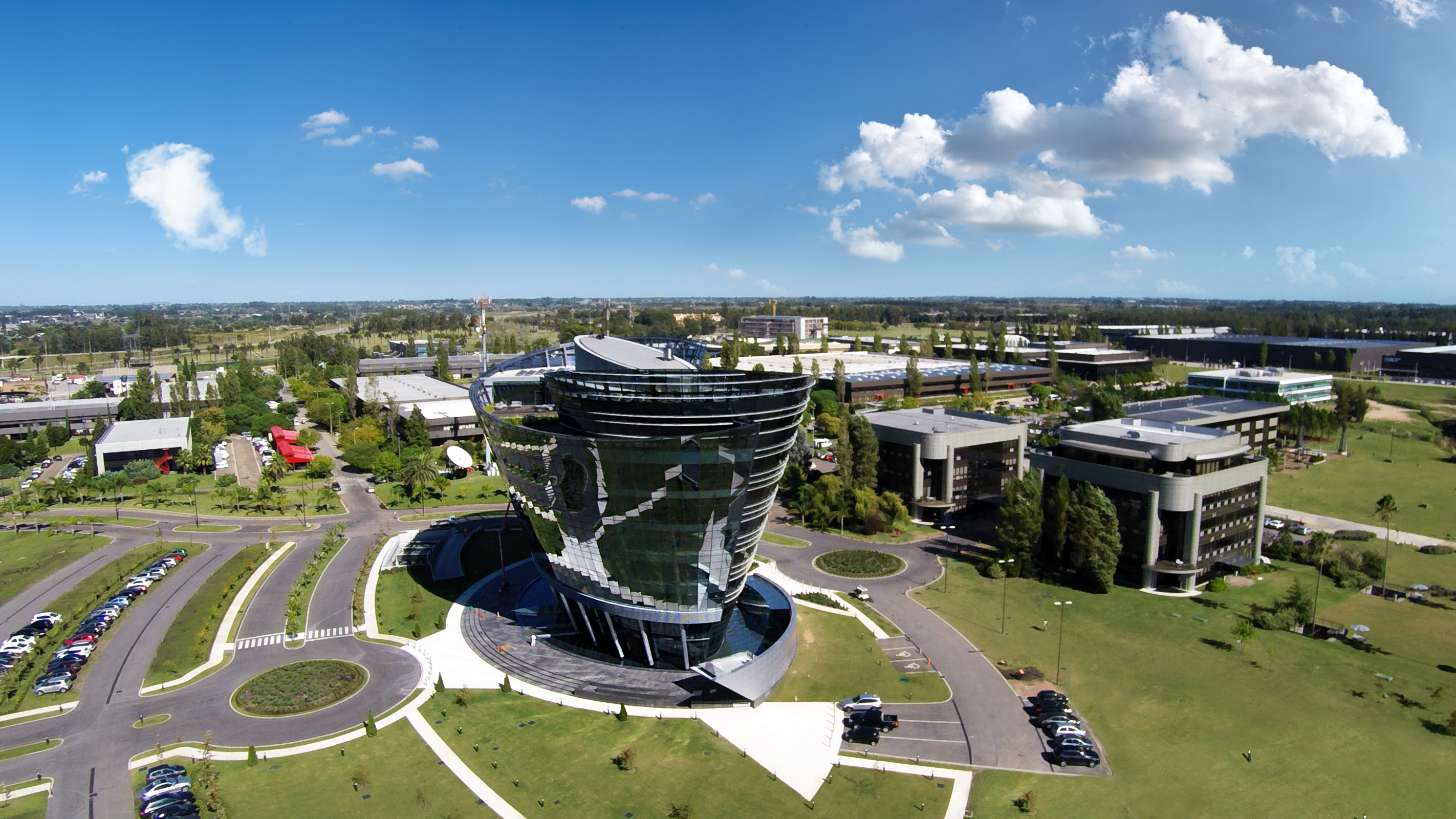
- Zonamerica aerial view
- Company type: Free Zone
- Industry: Real estate free zone
- Founded: 1990
- Headquarters: Montevideo, Uruguay, Ruta 8 – Km 17.500
- Key people: Cr. Orlando Dovat (Director)
- Services: Global Services; Regional Headquarters; Shared Service Centers; Financial Services; Software Development; Call Centers; Regional Logistics and Regional Distribution Centers
- Website: Official website

Zonamerica is a Business and Technology park in Uruguay operating under the Free Zone Law since 1990. In 2019, some 10,000 people in 350 companies work in 30 buildings in Zonamerica. The same year, there are more than 90,000 sq mt built areas, of which 88% are shared and rented areas. A global survey showed a 93% of satisfaction among the Zonamerica's companies.

== Zonamerica ==
Zonamerica is the first private Free Zone in Uruguay, operating under the Free Zone law which was established in 1987.

Zonamerica offers services that range from satellite design and construction to architecture, infrastructure, security, technology, embassies and human resources support.

In 2011 Zonamerica was chosen by the Americas Free Trade Zones Association (AZFA) as the best Free Zone in the Americas. In the year 2014 it was also acknowledged as the best Free Zone in the Americas by fDi Magazine, published by the Financial Times Group.

Nowadays over 10.000 people work at Zonamerica with over 350 tenant companies operating on site.

Zonamerica covers 92 hectares under Free Zone Regime. It has over 30 buildings and over 300.000 m2 of parks and recreation areas.

Some of the tenant companies working at the park are: Assist Card, CITI, Despegar.com, Julius Baer, Merck, PWC, Altisource, Ricoh, Sabre, Tata, Trafigura, Costa Oriental, Verifone, and NÜR Süd.

According to the latest Free Zone Census conducted by the National Institute of Statistics (INE), Zonamerica accounts for 1.82% of Uruguay's GDP.

== History ==
Some of the most significant events in Zonamerica's history:

Year	Milestone
1987	The New Free Zone Law Nº 15.921 is passed.
1990	The government authorized a 50 hectares plot to be worked under the Free Zone System. Construction begins.
1992	Inauguration of the first building, dedicated to logistics and manufacture.
1994	Decision 8 by Mercosur excludes Free Zones. Zonamerica reinvents itself by launching its Global Services Platform.
2000	New service platform: IT & Software Development. Inauguration of the Silicon Plaza complex.
2003	Zonamerica's expansion to 92 hectares is authorized. Inauguration of the Biotec Building for the promotion of the Biotechnology service platform.
2010	The Celebra Building begins construction.
2011	Zonamerica is chosen as the Best Free Zone in the Americas under the XV Latin-American Free Zone Conference.
2014	Zonamerica is once again chosen as the Best Free Zone in the Americas by the fDi Magazine, of the Financial Times Group.
2015	In the year of its 25th anniversary, the Celebra Building is inaugurated. It obtains the U.S. Green Building Council's recognition as the first and only Leed Gold certified building in Uruguay.
2016	The construction work for the first Zonamerica project outside of Uruguay begins, replicating in Colombia, in the city of Cali, a business park exclusively dedicated for promoting exports of Global Services.

== Free Zone Law ==
The Free Zone Law (N° 15.921, pass December 17, 1987) states that Free Zones are national territory areas, where economic activity and high-end job creation are stimulated though a specific regime

Nowadays, Free Zones in Uruguay create more than 15.000 jobs and are a relevant instrument for the promotion of foreign investment in the country.

Some benefits of the Free Zone Law:

- It allows commercial, industrial and service-industry activities.
- It protects the established companies from any possible change, generating clear and stable game rules for business.
- Exoneration for national taxes, existent or forthcoming.
- Exemption from social security contributions for expatriates.
- Free movement of capitals and utility repatriation without legal restrictions.
- No restrictions on the circulation of foreign currency, precious materials, bonds or any other type of commercial or financial papers.

== Celebra Building ==
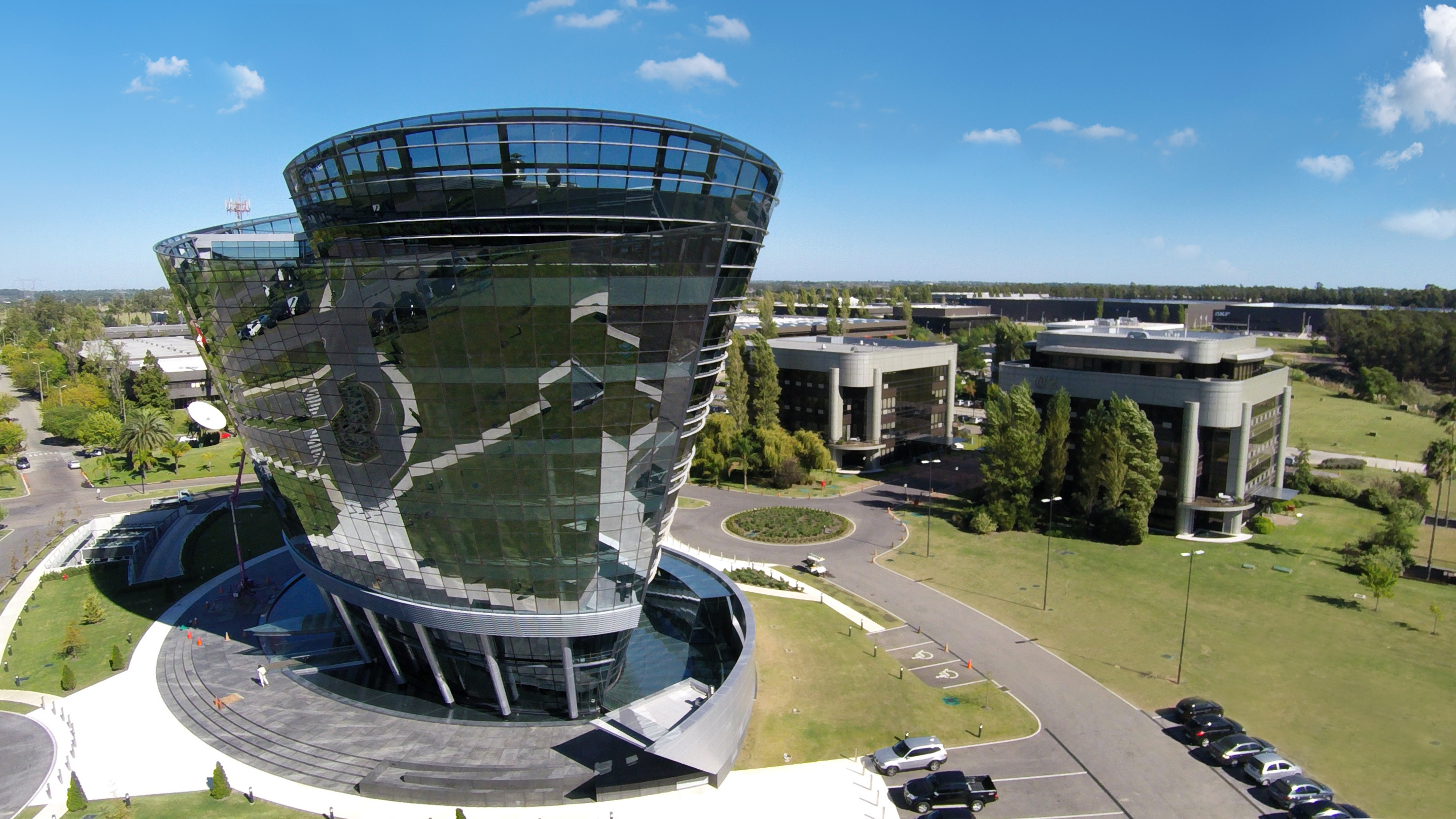
Celebra Building

In the context of its 20th anniversary's celebration, Zonamerica hired architects Carlos Ott and Carlos Ponce de León the design of a new Class A office building, which was finally named Celebra Building.

Located at Zonamerica, the Celebra Building was awarded at London as the Best Office Building in the World at the International Property Awards, in association with Bloomberg.

The Celebra Building if the first LEED GOLD certified building in Uruguay, by the U.S. Green Building Council.

== Zonamerica Colombia ==
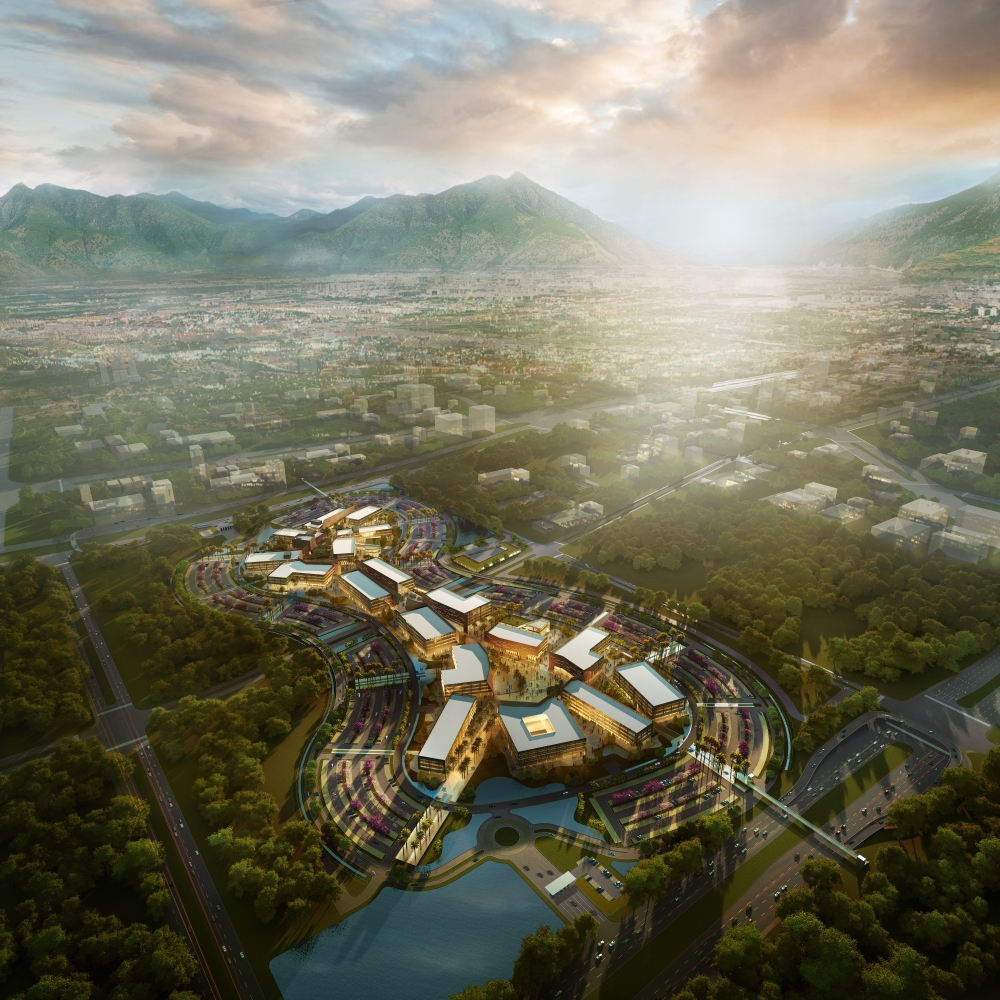
Zonamerica Colombia Project

In partnership with local business developer Carvajal Group, Zonamerica began its first internationalization process that will follow the same principles of design, architecture, technology and services as its original project in Uruguay, aiming to attract companies dedicated to global services processes.

This project is located at a 38-hectare plot south of Cali, Valle del Cauca department. It will include the construction of 18 last generation buildings, started in March 2016. It is expected that the park will be open for business in early 2017.
