= Esquerdinha (footballer, born 1980) =

Brazilian footballer

Personal information
- Full name: Glasner da Silva Albuquerque
- Date of birth: 28 February 1980 (age 46)
- Place of birth: Alexânia, Brazil
- Position: Forward

Team information
- Current team: Serrana

Youth career
- 1998: Irineu
- 1998–1999: Lecce
- 1999–2000: Juventus

Senior career*
Years	Team	Apps	(Gls)
1998–1999	Lecce	0	(0)
- ?
2004	Caxias	0	(0)
2009	J. Junckes	0	(0)
2010	Pirabeiraba	0	(0)
2011	América (SC)	0	(0)
2011	Pirabeiraba	0	(0)
2012	América (SC)	0	(0)
2012	Juventus de Joinville	0	(0)
2012	Garuva	0	(0)
2012–2013	América (SC)	0	(0)
2013	Serrana	0	(0)
- * Club domestic league appearances and goals

Glasner da Silva Albuquerque (born 28 February 1980), known as Esquerdinha (literally the young left one, is a former professional Brazilian footballer.

== Biography ==
Born in Alexânia, Goiás, Esquerdinha started his career at Santa Catarina state. He was scouted by Lecce in 1998 Torneo di Viareggio when he was representing Irineu. Lecce also sold Dejan Govedarica in order to sign the non-EU player. He played his only match with the Serie B club in 1998–99 Coppa Italia, replacing Francesco Cozza at the second half on 11 November 1998. The match Lecce lost 0–4 to Fiorentina.

In January 1999 he was signed by Juventus in co-ownership deal for a reported 1 billion Italian lire (about €500,000) and was included the squad for 1999 Torneo di Viareggio. Esquerdinha returned to Brazil in February 2000.

Since played for his last semi-professional club Caxias for 2004 Campeonato Catarinense, he retired from professional football but remained in Santa Catarina.

In 2009, he played for J. Junckes and in 2010 left for Pirabeiraba, a local side of Joinville. In 2011, he was a player of América (SC) (as captain) and Pirabeiraba from June. In 2012, he returned to América again. and in March left for Juventus FC of Joinville.

In July 2013 he was signed by Serrana.
