= 2003 in architecture =

The year 2003 in architecture involved some significant architectural events and new buildings.

== Events ==
- July 1 – Taipei 101 is topped out to become the tallest building in the world.
- December 20 – Triumph-Palace apartment building in Moscow becomes the highest building in Europe.
- date unknown
  - Daniel Libeskind's design, entitled Memory Foundations, is accepted for the World Trade Center site in New York.
  - Demolition of the Department of the Environment Building (completed 1971) at Marsham Street, Westminster, London. A new five storey glass-faced Home Office building is being erected in its place.
  - Nathaniel Kahn's film, My Architect: A Son's Journey, is nominated for the 2003 Academy Award for Documentary Feature.

== Buildings and structures ==
=== Buildings opened ===
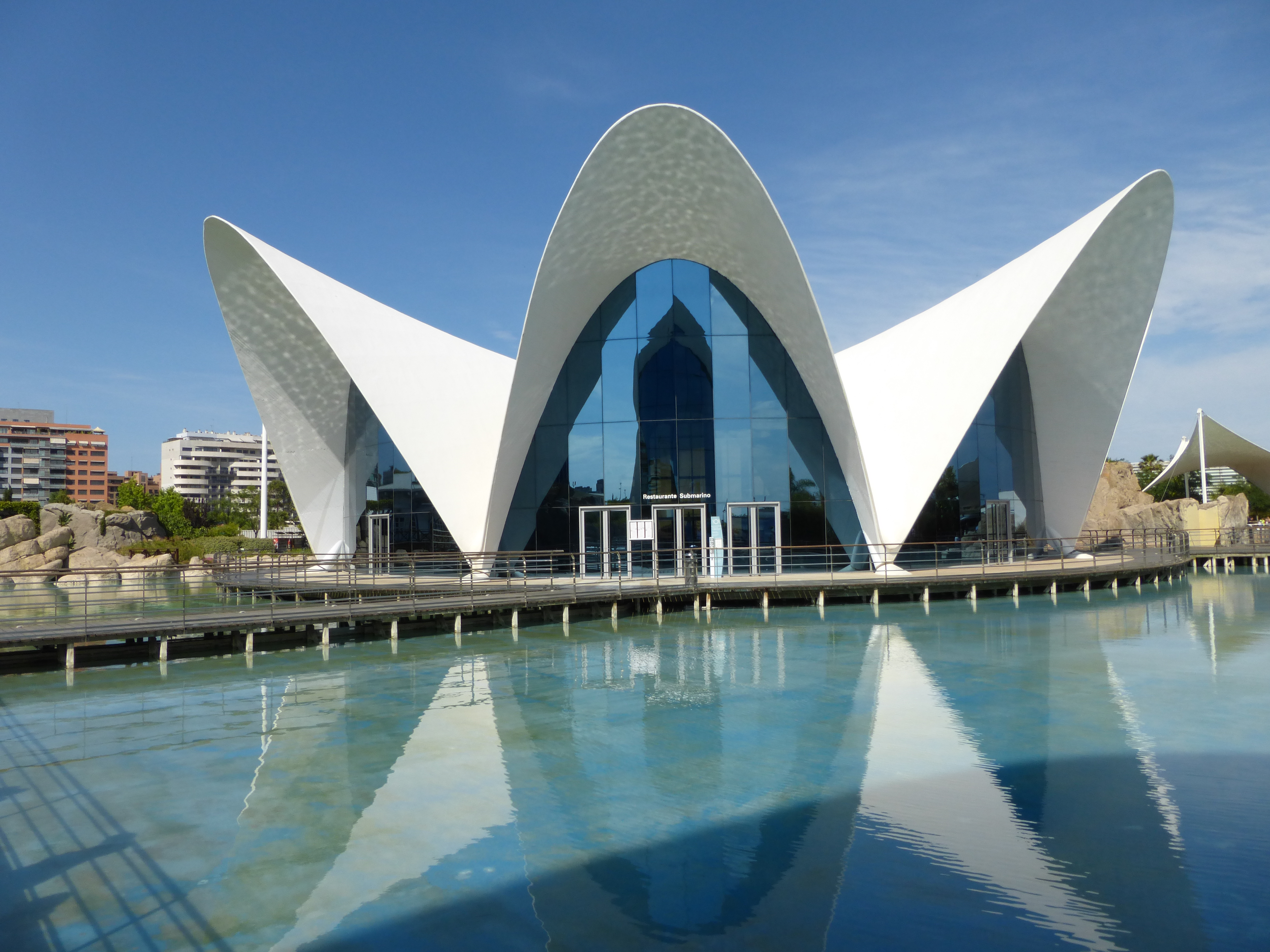
L'Oceanogràfic in Valencia, Spain

Walt Disney Concert Hall in Los Angeles, California, USA

- January 26 — Friedman Wrestling Center at Cornell University opens, designed by CannonDesign. Friedman is said to be "the first arena in the nation built solely for [wrestling]."
- February 8 – New Salt Lake City Public Library (Utah), USA, designed by Moshe Safdie and VCBO Architecture.
- February 14 – L'Oceanogràfic marine park in Valencia, Spain, designed by Félix Candela, Alberto Domingo and Carlos Lázaro.
- March 30 – Leonard P. Zakim Bunker Hill Memorial Bridge across the Charles River in Boston, Massachusetts, USA, a cable-stayed bridge designed by Christian Menn, Theodore Zoli (from HNTB), W. Denney Pate (from FIGG) and Ruchu Hsu with Parsons Brinckerhoff, is opened northbound (southbound December 20).
- May – Fashion and Textile Museum in the London borough of Bermondsey, a warehouse conversion by Ricardo Legorreta.
- May 10 – Christchurch Art Gallery in New Zealand, designed by the Buchan Group.
- July 8 – Oscar Niemeyer Museum (Novo Museu) reopens in Curitiba, Brazil, originally designed by Oscar Niemeyer.
- September 4 – Selfridges store in Birmingham, England, designed by Czech-born British architect Jan Kaplický of Future Systems.
- September – Maggie's Centre, Dundee, Scotland, a drop-in cancer care centre; Frank Gehry's first work in the United Kingdom.
- October 23 – Walt Disney Concert Hall, designed by Frank Gehry, in Los Angeles, California, USA.
- December 30 – Estádio Municipal de Braga, Portugal, designed by Eduardo Souto de Moura.

=== Buildings completed ===
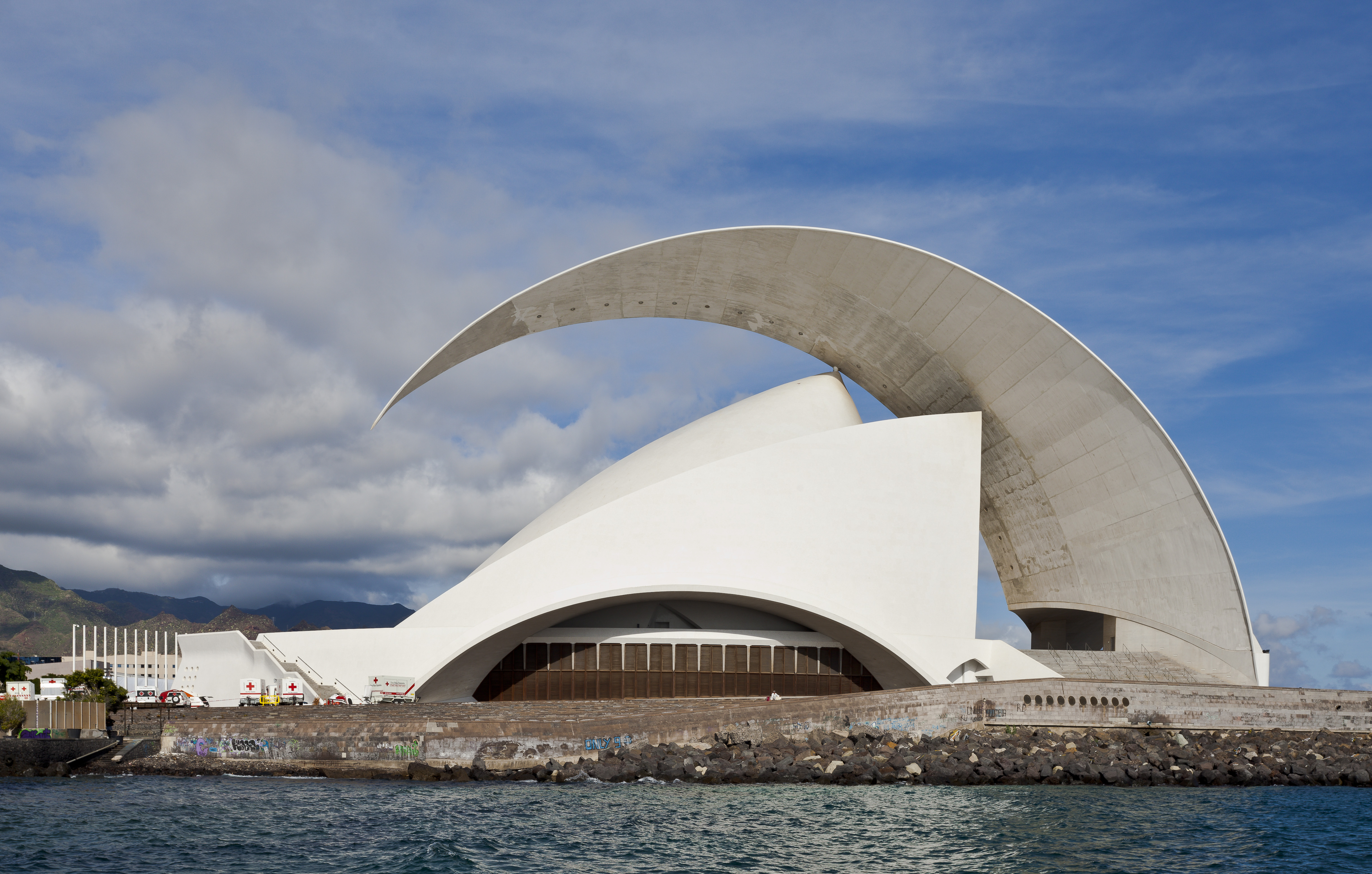
Auditorio de Tenerife in Santa Cruz de Tenerife, Canary Islands, Spain

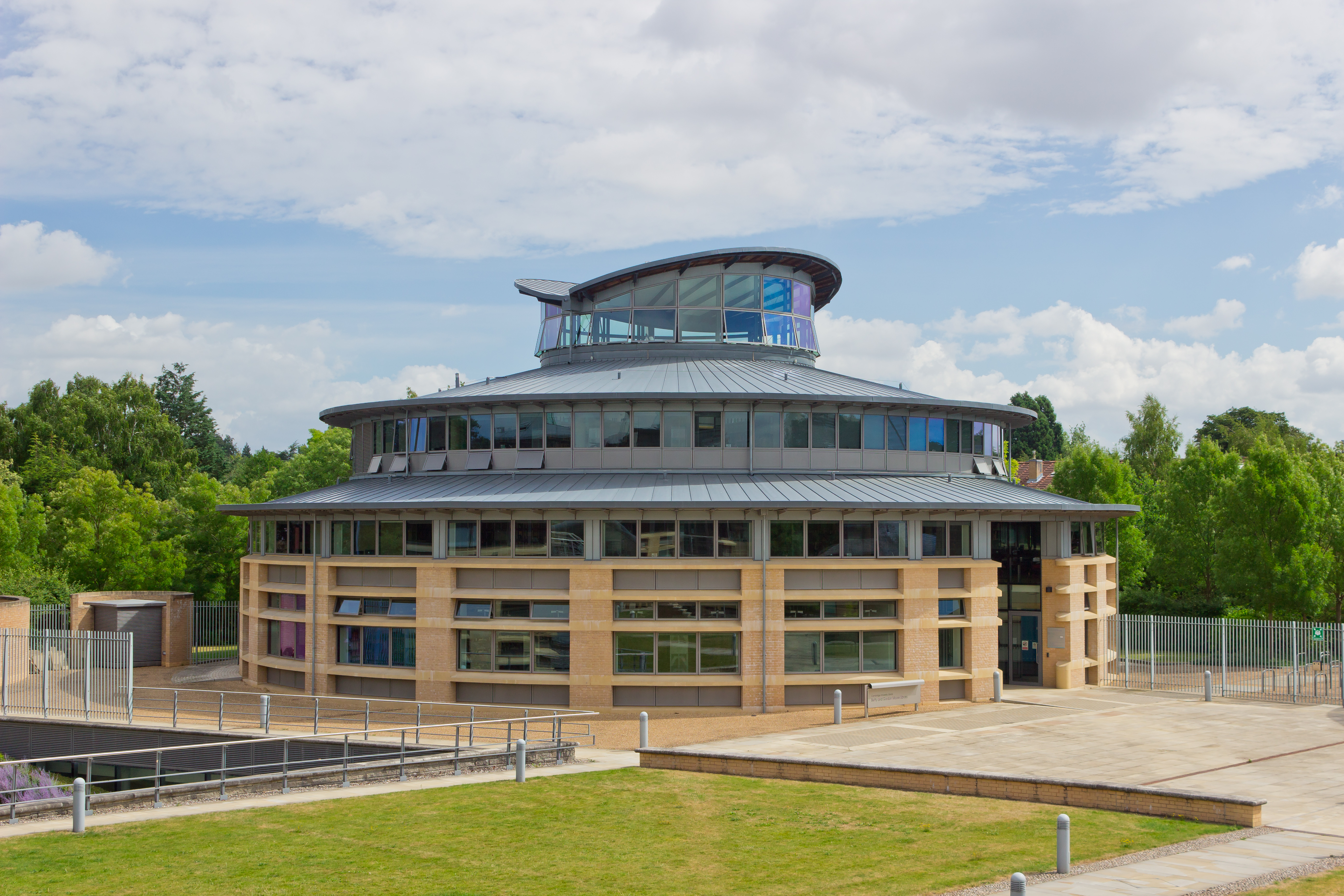
The Centre for Mathematical Sciences (Cambridge), England

- Auditorio de Tenerife in Santa Cruz de Tenerife, Canary Islands, Spain, designed by Santiago Calatrava
- Centre for Mathematical Sciences (Cambridge), England, designed by Edward Cullinan Architects.
- Corrour Lodge, Inverness-shire, Scotland, designed by Moshe Safdie.
- The Doughnut (Government Communications Headquarters), near Cheltenham, England.
- Eleanor Roosevelt College, University of California, San Diego, designed by Moshe Safdie.
- Anshun Bridge replica in Chengdu, China, completed in August.
- Kamačnik Bridge, Gorski Kotar, Croatia, designed by Zlatko Šavor and built by Konstruktor.
- Kista Science Tower, Stockholm, Sweden.
- Schaulager, Münchenstein, Switzerland, designed by Herzog & de Meuron.
- Pantages Tower, Toronto, Ontario, Canada, designed by Moshe Safdie and Core Architects.
- Park Pobedy station in the Moscow Metro system.
- Zeughaus Wing of Deutsches Historisches Museum, designed by I. M. Pei, opens in Berlin.
- Peabody Essex Museum new wing, designed by Moshe Safdie, opens in Salem, Massachusetts.
- Latino Cultural Center in Dallas, Texas, designed by Ricardo Legorreta.
- Taipei Treasure Hill designed by Marco Casagrande.
- Keller Estate Winery in Petaluma, California, designed by Ricardo Legorreta.
- Oare Pavilion in Wiltshire, England, designed by I. M. Pei.
- Black rubber house, Dungeness beach, Kent, England, designed by Simon Conder Associates.
- Pie house in Deerfield, Illinois.
- Torre Mayor, the tallest building in Mexico (2003–present).

== Awards ==
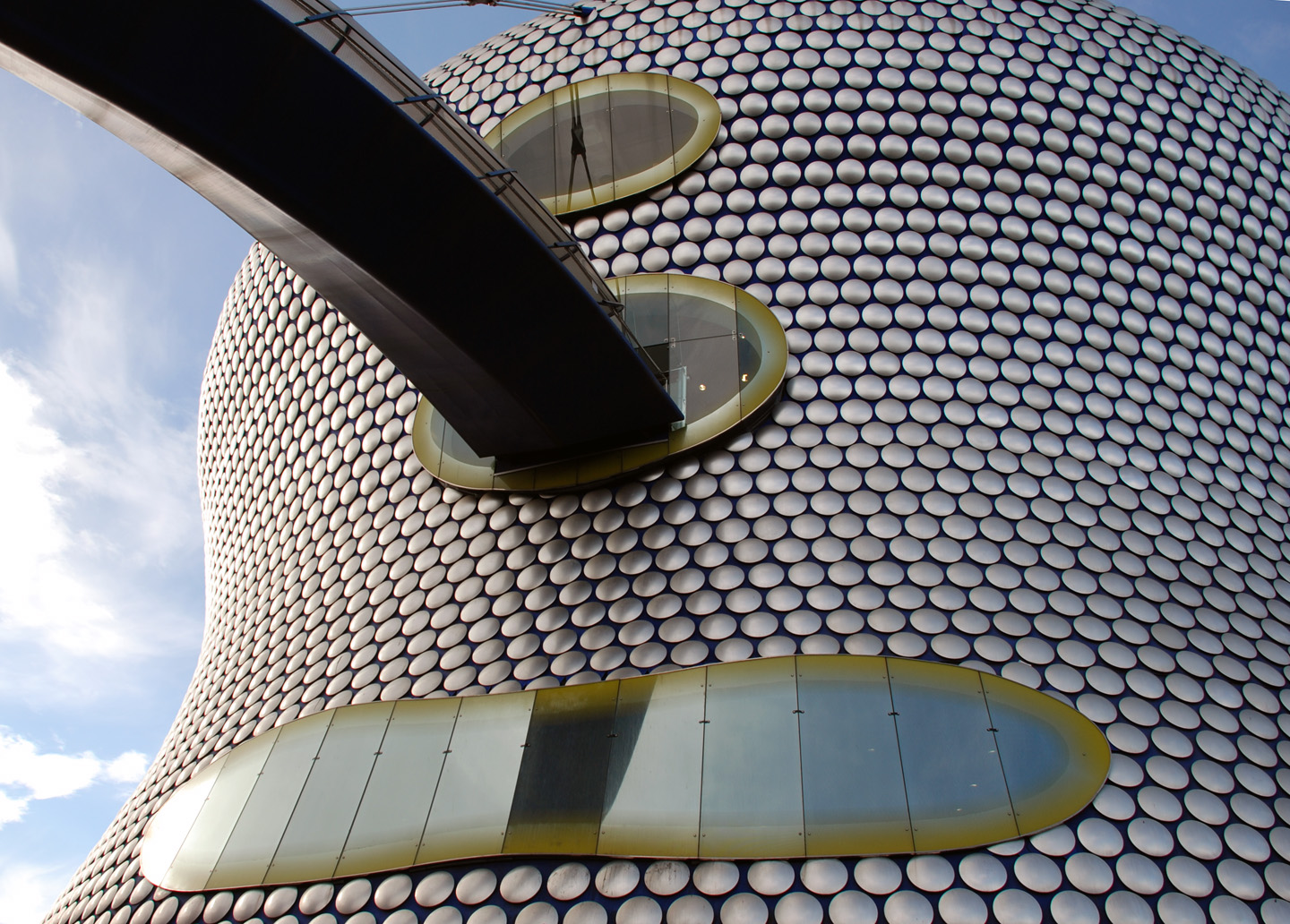
The Selfridges Building in the Bull Ring in Birmingham, which wins Future Systems seven architecture awards

- Architecture Firm Award – The Miller Hull Partnership
- Alvar Aalto Medal – Rogelio Salmona
- Driehaus Prize – Léon Krier
- Emporis Skyscraper Award – 30 St Mary Axe
- European Union Prize for Contemporary Architecture (Mies van der Rohe Prize) – Zaha Hadid for Car Park and Terminus Hoenheim North
- Grand Prix de l'urbanisme – Michel Corajoud
- Mies van der Rohe Prize – Zaha Hadid
- Praemium Imperiale Architecture Laureate – Rem Koolhaas
- Pritzker Prize – Jørn Utzon
- Prix de l'Équerre d'Argent – Yves Lion and Claire Piguet, French Embassy in Beirut
- RAIA Gold Medal – Peter Corrigan
- RIAS Award for Architecture – Sutherland Hussey Architects for An Turas Ferry Shelter, Tiree
- RIBA Royal Gold Medal – Rafael Moneo
- Stirling Prize – Herzog & de Meuron for Laban, Deptford, London
- Thomas Jefferson Medal in Architecture – Tod Williams and Billie Tsien
- Twenty-five Year Award – Design Research Headquarters Building

== Deaths ==
- March 3 – Peter Smithson, English architect (born 1923)
- March 6 – Sam Scorer, English architect (born 1923)
- April 10 – Abraham Zabludovsky, Polish-born Mexican architect (born 1924)
- May 5 – Sir Philip Powell, English architect (born 1921)
- May 27 – Geoffrey Bawa, Sri Lankan architect (born 1919)
- August 10 – Cedric Price, English architect (born 1934)

== See also ==
- Timeline of architecture
