= Peter Frank Stott =

British civil engineer (1927–1993)

Peter Frank Stott CBE
- Born: 8 August 1927; London, England
- Died: 16 August 1993 (aged 66); Truro, Cornwall, England
- Occupation: Civil engineer
- Known for: President of the Institution of Civil Engineers
- Notable work: Kings Avenue Bridges, Gladesville Bridge, Tasman Bridge, Narrows Bridge, Hammersmith flyover
- Spouse: Vera Watkins
- Children: 2 sons

Peter Frank Stott CBE (8 August 1927 – 16 August 1993) was a British civil engineer. Specialising in prestressed concrete, he designed several bridges in Australia. Stott's work on the Hammersmith flyover brought him to the attention of the London County Council where he was appointed deputy chief engineer. He subsequently became chief engineer and was appointed Director of Highways and Transportation upon the creation of the Greater London Council. He became one of the first joint controllers at the council when the planning department became part of his remit. Stott left the council to become Director-General of the National Water Council. He was appointed a Commander of the Order of the British Empire in 1978 and in 1983 became a professor at King's College London. Stott wrote a 1987 report on the use of open level crossings on the rail network that led to a significant change in British Rail policy and served as president of the Institution of Civil Engineers for 1989–90.

== Career ==
Stott was born in London on 8 August 1927. He worked as a structural engineer and by the age of 28 was made a partner in the firm of Guy Maunsell. Stott was an expert in the use of prestressed concrete and designed the Kings Avenue Bridges in Canberra, Gladesville Bridge in Sydney, Tasman Bridge near Hobart and the Narrows Bridge in Perth – all in Australia. After he completed the design of the Hammersmith flyover for London County Council (LCC) he was appointed deputy chief engineer by the LCC in 1963. Stott had particular responsibility for the council's road network before becoming chief engineer upon the death of Francis Fuller.

In 1965 Stott was made Director of Highways and Transportation upon the creation of the Greater London Council. He brought in experts from the United States, offering greatly increased salaries to attract the best candidates, a system that helped increase the salaries for engineers across the UK. Stott's eight years as director saw the construction of London's first motorways and the extension of computerised control to two thirds of the city's signalised junctions. His role expanded in 1969 when he assumed control of the planning department, becoming one of the councils first joint controllers. Stott served as president of the Reinforced Concrete Association in 1964, of the Concrete Society in 1967 and of the Institute of Highway Engineers in 1971.

Stott left the London Council in 1973 to take up the post of Director-General of the newly founded National Water Council, a position he held for ten years until the body was dissolved. In this period he was also Secretary General of the International Water Supply Association. In 1978 Stott was appointed a Commander of the Order of the British Empire in the Queen's Birthday Honours of 3 June. Between 1983 and 1989 Stott was Nash Professor of Civil Engineering at King's College London. Stott was commissioned by the British government to write a report into the use of open (unguarded) level crossings on the British Rail network following the Lockington rail crash in which a passenger train collided with a van on a level crossing resulting in the deaths of nine people. Stott's report was published in August 1987 and led to a significant change in British Rail policy and the installation of barriers or reduction of train speeds at 75 locations.

Stott was appointed chairman of the Quality Scheme for Ready Mixed Concrete in 1989. He served three terms on the council of the Institution of Civil Engineers and was its president between November 1989 and November 1990. Stott's portrait at the institution shows the Hammersmith Flyover in the background.

== Personal life ==
Stott married Vera Watkins in 1953 and the couple had two sons. Stott died in Truro, Cornwall, on 16 August 1993.

Professional and academic associations
Preceded by Alastair Craig Paterson	President of the Institution of Civil Engineers; November 1989 – November 1990	Succeeded by Roy Thomas Severn
