= Jan Kaplický =

Czech architect (1937–2009)

- Born: 18 April 1937; Prague, Czechoslovakia
- Died: 14 January 2009 (aged 71); Prague, Czech Republic
- Occupation: Architect
- Awards: Stirling Prize (1999); World Architecture Awards (2001), Royal Institute of British Architects Award for Architecture (2004), Medal of Merit (2025) Czech Republic
- Practice: Future Systems
- Buildings: Media Centre, Lord's Cricket Ground, London (1999); Selfridges Building, the Bull Ring, Birmingham (2003); Museo Casa Enzo Ferrari, Modena, Italy (2012)
- Projects: National Library of the Czech Republic, Prague, Czech Republic (commission awarded 2007, cancelled 2008)
- Design: Neo-Futurism

Jan Kaplický (/ˈjæn ˈkæplɪtski/; Czech: [ˈjan ˈkaplɪtskiː]; 18 April 1937 – 14 January 2009) was a Neofuturistic Czech architect who spent a significant part of his life in the United Kingdom. He was the leading architect behind the innovative design office, Future Systems. He was best known for the neofuturistic Selfridges Building in Birmingham, England, and the Media Centre at Lord's Cricket Ground in London.

== Childhood and early life ==
Jan Kaplický, the only child of a sculptor and a botanical illustrator, was born on 18 April 1937 in Prague, Czechoslovakia, and grew up in a Prague neighborhood called Ořechovka.

Between 1956 and 1962, Kaplický studied at the College of Applied Arts and Architecture and Design (VSUP) in Prague, receiving a Diploma in Architecture. He worked in private practice in Czechoslovakia between 1964 and 1968. In the wake of the Prague Spring, the Soviet invasion of Czechoslovakia, he escaped to London in September 1968 with fellow architect Jaroslav Vokoun carrying only US$100 and a few pairs of socks. In 1969 in London, he met Eva Jiřičná again, whom he had known in Prague and became his girlfriend.

== Career ==
=== Early career ===
In England, Kaplický first worked for Denys Lasdun and Partners (1969–1971), then obtained employment with the office of Renzo Piano and Richard Rogers (1971–1973), where he worked on DRU extension at Aybrook Street, London and later helping to develop the design for the Centre Georges Pompidou (constructed 1971–1977) in Paris by joining the team of more than 30 strong. When the practice relocated to Paris, he was unable to follow as at that time he still did not have a British passport. After working with Jiřičná, and a short spell at Spencer and Webster, Associates (1974–1975), he joined Foster Associates, now Foster and Partners (1979–1983).

In 1979, Kaplický set up his own architectural think tank called Future Systems with David Nixon, and began to develop an architectural style that combined organic forms with high tech futurism. Among the drawings he made were structures orbiting the Earth built by robots, weekend houses resembling survival capsules that could be transported by helicopter, and home interiors that could be manipulated. In the 1980s his design for the Grand Buildings in Trafalgar Square, London, was a free-form monocoque structure pierced by portholes; it lost to a more conventional reconstruction of an Edwardian facade. Kaplický told BusinessWeek in 2005: "Where is it written that buildings have to be boxes? People aren't boxes."

Amanda Levete joined Future Systems as a partner in 1989. Kaplický and Levete married in 1991 and were a couple for 15 years; they had a son named Josef. Although they divorced in 2006, they continued their professional association in the architectural practice, saying that the separation strengthened their working relationship.

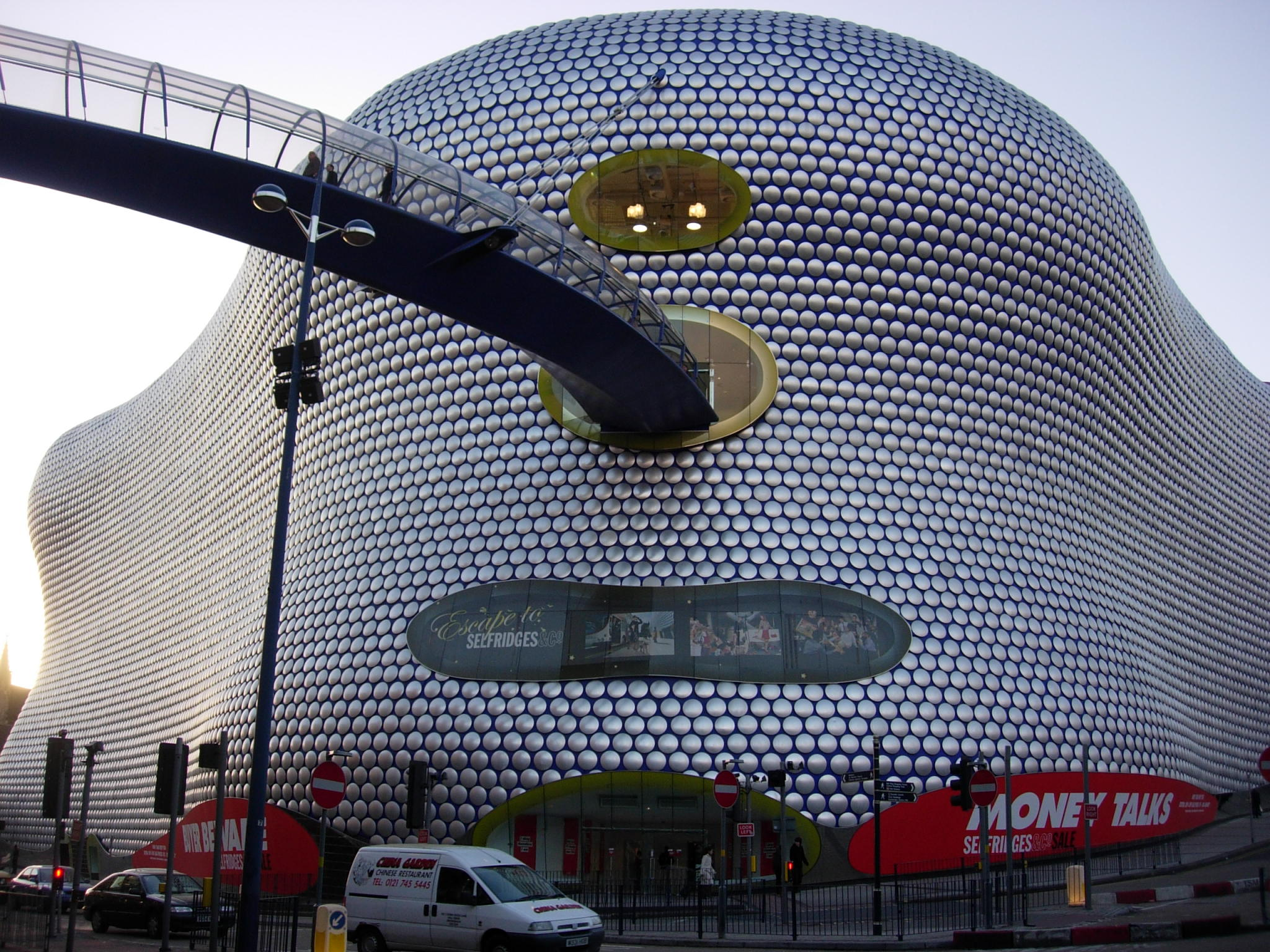

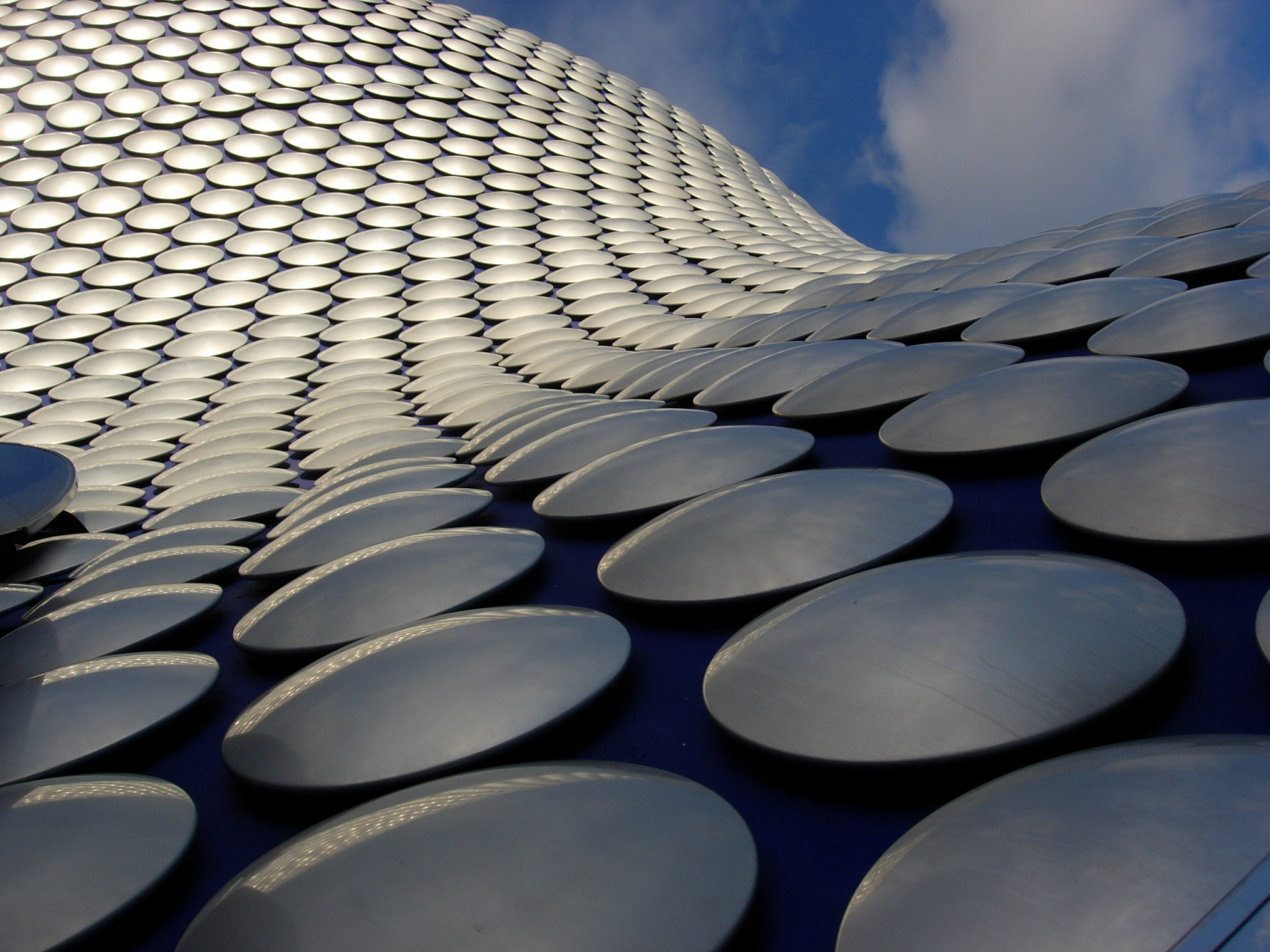
The Selfridges Building in the Bull Ring in Birmingham, which won Future Systems seven awards, including the RIBA Award for Architecture 2004.

Although Kaplický was a finalist for the Prince Philip Prize for designer of the year in 1991, for the first 15 years of its existence Future Systems, he received few commissions until 1994, where the company was commissioned to build the new media centre at Lord's Cricket Ground which eventually won the Royal Institute of British Architects (RIBA) Stirling Prize – considered the most prestigious architecture award in the UK – in 1999 and the World Architecture Awards in 2001. Kaplický considered the media centre "my favourite creation", saying, "It is something which was revolutionary in many areas – a real technical achievement – but above all, the people operating inside it have said: 'We love it,' and that's great." In 2000, he was made an Honourable Fellow of RIBA. Future Systems' next major project, the iconic Selfridges Building in the Bull Ring in Birmingham, won seven awards, including the RIBA Award for Architecture 2004. That year, Kaplický was the subject of a Czech documentary titled Profil (Profile).

=== Final years and death ===
In 2007, Kaplický won the design competition for the new Czech National Library building. This would be his first major building in his home country, and he said the project was the most important event in his life. However, the design for the building, resembling a green and purple blob and nicknamed by locals "the Octopus", was heavily criticised. President of the Czech Republic Václav Klaus was overheard saying he would be willing to prevent the building going ahead with his own body; his spokesman later clarified it was an off-hand remark that had not been meant to be taken seriously. Pavel Bém, the Civic Democrat Mayor of Prague, supported the design when it was selected but later become hostile to it, saying that the City Council of Prague, which is dominated by the Civil Democratic Party, would not allow the Octopus to be built as it would ruin Prague's panorama. Vlastimil Jezek, a former director of the Library, regarded Kaplický as "another protagonist of Czech culture who has been crushed by Czech narrow-mindedness." Although the design was eventually dropped, Kaplický remained hopeful that the building would be built through funds from a private foundation established for this purpose.

Apart from his design work, Kaplický was active in the education of architects. From 1982 to 1988, he taught at the Architectural Association School of Architecture, the oldest independent architectural school in the UK. In 1992, Kaplický taught at the School of Architecture in Bordeaux and at the Design Workshop of the Technische Universität Berlin. He was also an external examiner for the Architectural Association between 1995 and 1998, and in 2000 was an assessor for the Domus Awards of the B.B.J. Competition in Milan.

In October 2008, news broke that Kaplický and Levete intended to go their separate ways after having collaborated professionally for 20 years. Kaplický was due to keep the Future Systems practice name.

Towards the end of his life, Kaplický began to spend more time in the Czech Republic, where he was awaiting the construction of the Czech National Library and where his design for the Congress and Concert Hall Centre in České Budějovice had been approved. He married the film producer Eliška Kaplická (née Fuchsová), in 2007. On 14 January 2009, hours after the birth of his daughter Johanna Kaplická, he collapsed on a street in Prague near Vítězné náměstí (Victory Square) with heart failure and could not be revived by emergency services. The city authorities of Budweis have announced their determination to obtain funding to finally build a Kaplický building in his native Czech Republic.

In a 2002 interview with The Observer, Kaplický said: "The world is full of beautiful things, and you have to be observant as an architect – if not, you are in trouble. Creativity is everywhere. ... The initial idea for a job comes to me literally just like that sometimes, and if that first idea is good then you are on the right track. It's not a sign of creativity to have 65 ideas for one problem, that's just a waste of energy. I also don't think you need to go anywhere particular to be creative; people just use that as an excuse. But I do think a lot of creativity depends on your relationships with other people, your personal relationships, your partner or whatever. Your personal happiness or unhappiness comes out in your work, it's a reflection of your emotional state and you can't separate the two."

== Major architectural projects ==
| Image | Information | Awards |
|---|---|---|
| Hauer-King House | Hauer-King House; Canonbury, London, England; Completed 1994 | First Prize, Aluminium Imagination Award (1995); Geoffrey Gribble Memorial Conservation Award (1995); Civic Trust Award (1996) |
| West India Quay Bridge | West India Quay Bridge; Docklands, London, England; Completed 1996 | British Construction Industry Award (1998); Civic Trust Award (1998); RIBA Award (1998) |
| Media Centre, Lord's Cricket Ground | Media Centre, Lord's Cricket Ground; London, England; Completed 1999 | BIAT Award for Technical Excellence (1999); British Construction Industry Award (1999); First Prize, Aluminium Imagination Award (1999); RIBA Stirling Prize (1999); Civic Trust Award (2000); World Architecture Awards (2001) |
| Selfridges Building | Selfridges Building; The Bull Ring, Birmingham, England; Completed 2003 | Civic Trust Award (2004); Destination of the Year, Retail Week Awards (2004); Institution of Civil Engineers (2004); Overall Winner, Concrete Society Awards (2004); RIBA Award for Architecture (2004); Royal Fine Art Commission Trust, Retail Innovation (2004); British Constructional Steelwork Association Structural Steel Design Awards (2004) |
| | Naples Subway Station; Naples, Italy; Commission awarded 2003; completed 2009 by Amanda Levete Architects | |
| Ferrari Museum | Museo Casa Enzo Ferrari; Modena, Italy; Completed 2012 | RIBA Award (2013) |
| | National Library of the Czech Republic; Prague, Czech Republic; Commission awarded 2007; project cancelled 2008. | |
| | Congress and Concert Hall Centre; České Budějovice (Budweis), Czech Republic; Commission awarded 2008. | |

== Awards and recognition ==
- Medal of Merit (2025)
