= Peter Stott =

Peter Stott may refer to:

- Peter A. Stott, British climate scientist
- Peter Frank Stott (1927–1993), British civil engineer
