= Museo Casa Enzo Ferrari =

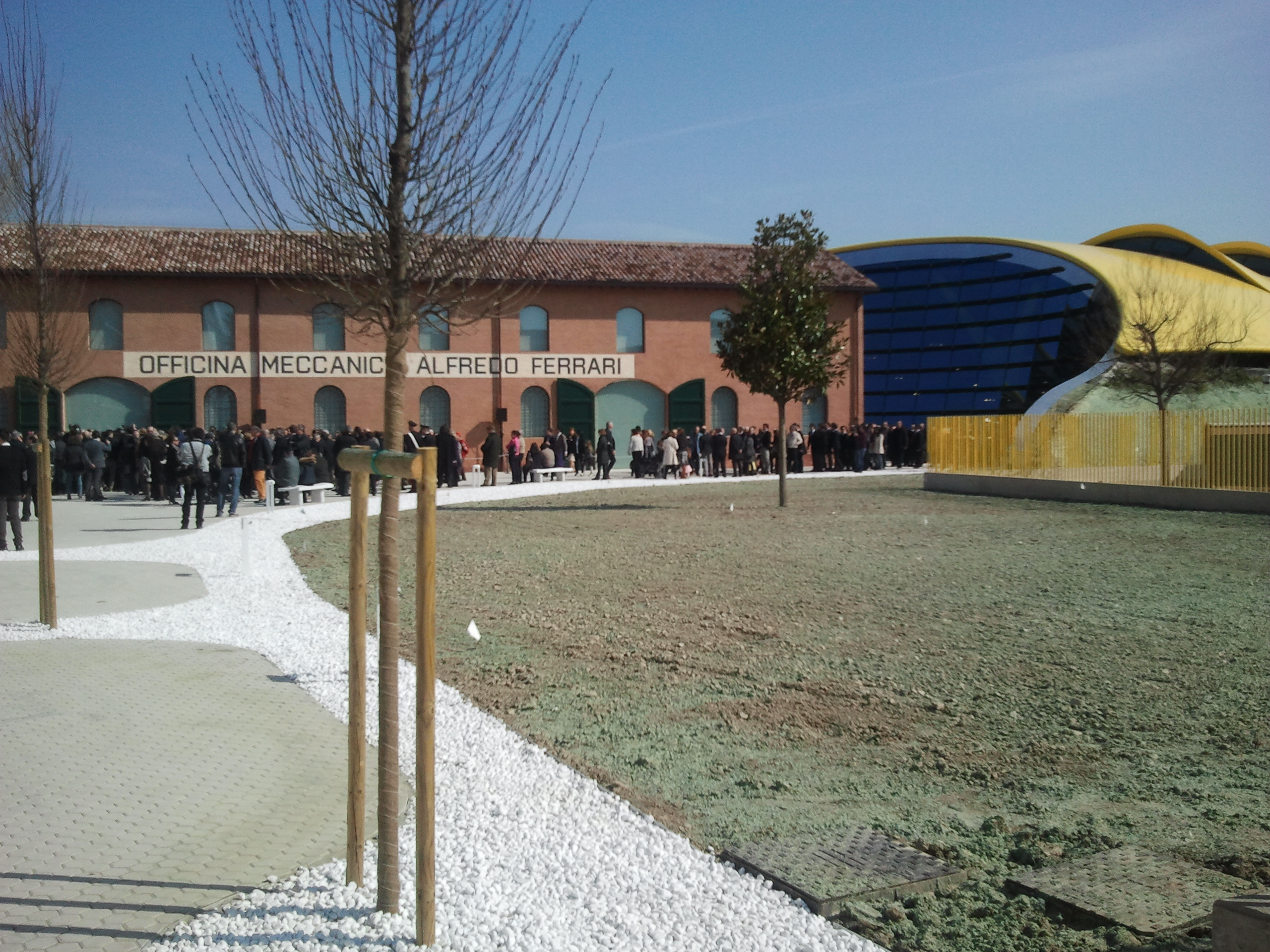
- The Museo Enzo Ferrari in Modena
- Established: March 2012; 14 years ago
- Location: Via Paolo Ferrari 85; 41121 Modena (MO); Italy
- Type: Automobile museum
- Architect: Future Systems
- Website: Museo Casa Enzo Ferrari

Museo Casa Enzo Ferrari (also known as Museo Enzo Ferrari) is a museum in Modena focused on the life and work of Enzo Ferrari, the founder of the Ferrari sports car marque. The museum complex includes two separate buildings, a former house and workshop that belonged to Enzo Ferrari's father, and a new building designed by the architectural practice Future Systems. The new 6,000 square metres (65,000 sq ft) building houses, in a large gallery, a permanent exhibition displaying some of the most noteworthy Ferrari automobiles, including rare cars of the 1950s, Formula One race cars and more recent sports cars.

The museum exhibition gallery was substantially renewed and updated in February 2014.

The exhibits feature Ferrari, Alfa Romeo and Maserati cars and also a large video-projection depicting the life of Enzo Ferrari.

== See also ==
- Museo Ferrari
