= Amanda Levete =

British architect

Amanda Levete CBE RA
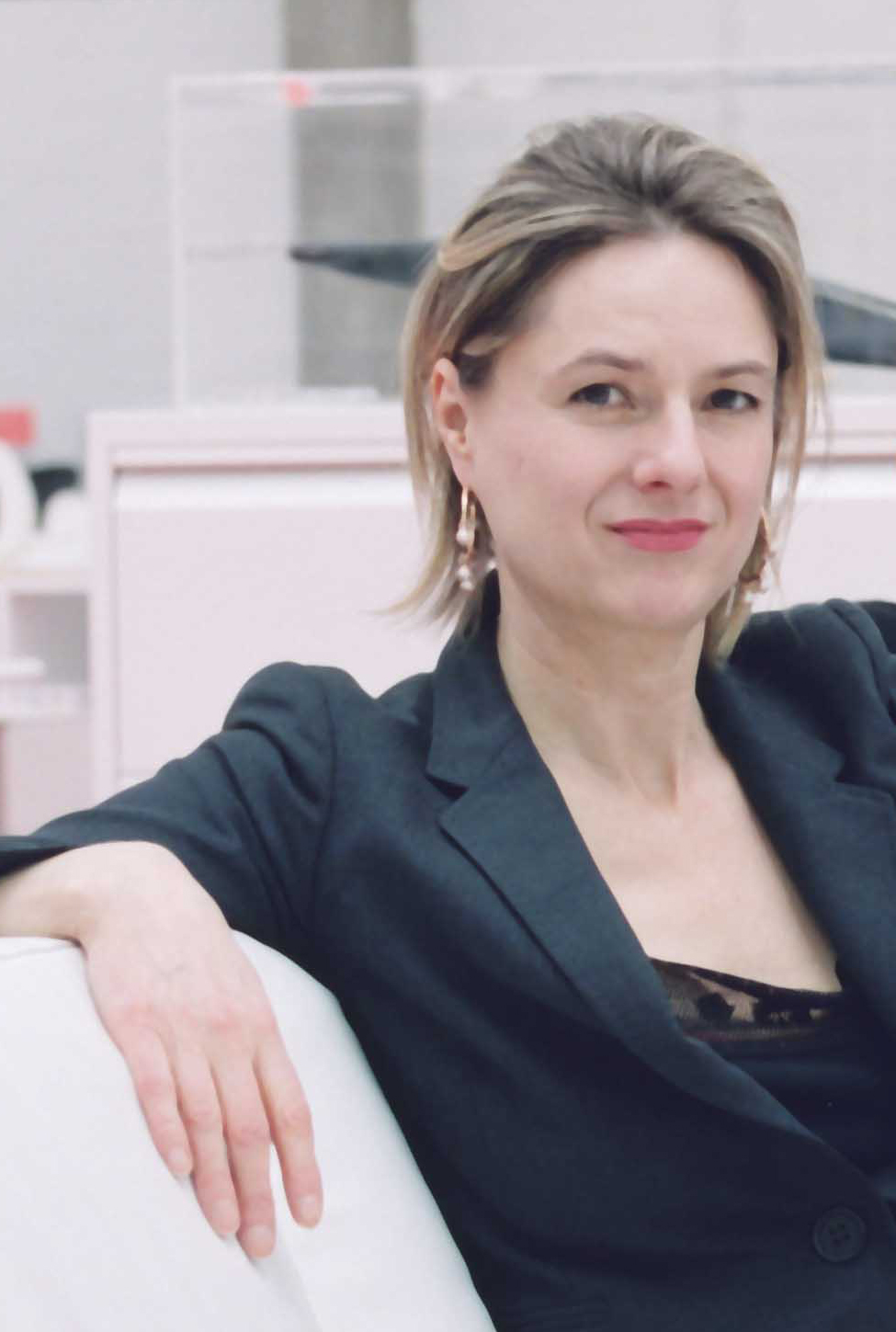
- Born: 17 November 1955 (age 71); Bridgend, Wales
- Education: Architectural Association
- Occupation: Architect
- Spouses: Jan Kaplický (1991–2006); Ben Evans (2007–present)
- Awards: Commander of the Order of the British Empire (2017); Jane Drew Prize (2018); RIBA Stirling Prize (2018); Honorary Fellow, AIA (2019); Royal Academician (2021)
- Practice: Powis & Levete (1985–1992); Future Systems (1989–2009); AL_A (since 2009)
- Projects: Selfridges Building, Birmingham; Lord's Media Centre, London; Exhibition Road extension, V&A, London; MAAT, Lisbon
- Website: ala.uk.com/

Amanda Jane Levete (born 17 November 1955) is a British architect and the principal of AL_A. While she worked as a partner at Future Systems, the company was awarded the 1999 Stirling Prize for their work on the Lord's Media Centre. She has received many accolades and awards, and in 2017 she was appointed CBE.

== Early life and education ==
Levete was born in Bridgend, South Wales. She attended St Paul's Girls' School in London and the Hammersmith School of Art, where she studied architecture before enrolling at the Architectural Association. Levete began her career as a trainee at Alsop & Lyall, and later worked as an architect at the Richard Rogers Partnership. In 1985, as a co-founder of Powis & Levete, she was nominated for the RIBA's 40 under 40 exhibition. Levete became a partner at Future Systems alongside Jan Kaplický in 1989.

== Career ==
=== Future Systems ===
From 1989 to 2009 Amanda Levete was a partner alongside her partner Jan Kaplicky at Future Systems. Notable projects include the RIBA Stirling Prize winning Lord’s Media Centre, and the Selfridges Birmingham store within the Bullring shopping centre. Their curvaceous buildings, made possible by new computer aided design technologies have been referred to as ‘blobitecture’.

=== AL_A ===
In 2009, Levete established AL_A (formerly known as Amanda Levete Architecture) following the end of her 20-year partnership with the late Jan Kaplický at Future Systems. The practice gained recognition in 2011when it won an international competition to design the Victoria and Albert Museum's new entrance on Exhibition Road. The project's courtyard and gallery feature custom made ceramic tiles. This project marked the museum's most significant undertaking in over a century. AL_A has been involved in various notable projects, including the Spencer Dock Bridge in Dublin (completed 2009), MPavilion in Melbourne (2015), the MAAT project in Lisbon for the EDP Foundation (completed 2017), the Central Embassy project in Bangkok (completed 2017), 10 Hill's Place in London (completed 2009) and the pop-up restaurant Tincan (completed 2014), The Dr. Lee Shau Kee Building and William Doo Undergraduate Centre for Wadham College at the University of Oxford (completed 2021), the design for Maggie's cancer care charity building in Southampton (completed 2021) and the media campus for News Corporation in East London.

Internationally, she has completed three hospital buildings in Cyprus, the redesign of the D'Ieteren Headquarters in Brussels, the design of a prototype fusion plant for clean energy firm General Fusion at Culham, and hotels and malls for the Central Retail Corporation in Bangkok.

MAAT – The Museum of Art, Architecture and Technology (2016)

Levete has also designed furniture pieces and objects for Established and Sons, Salvioni, Simon James and other companies.

In 2025, Levete was among the UK-based signatories of a letter to the Department for Science, Innovation and Technology secretary Peter Kyle urging the government to reconsider its plans to allow artificial intelligence models to be trained using copyrighted works without permission.

== Awards and recognition ==
In the 2017 Queen's Birthday Honours, Levete was appointed Commander of the Order of the British Empire (CBE) for her contributions to architecture.

In 2018, Levete received the Jane Drew Prize from the Architects' Journal and Architectural Review. The prize acknowledges individuals who promote the visibility of women in architecture through their dedication to design excellence.

In 2019, Levete was elected an Honorary Fellow of the American Institute of Architects.

In 2021, Levete was elected as a Royal Academician.

She served as a trustee of the arts organisation Artangel from 2000 to 2013 and as a trustee of the Young Foundation.

As of 2026, Levete is a trustee of the Victoria and Albert Museum.

She has also received the following awards and prizes:

- Stirling Prize RIBA National Award (2018)
- Cultural Project of the Year, AJ Awards (2017)
- Leading Culture Destination Award, Best Museum Architecture (2017)
- Iconic Awards, Architecture Best of Best (2017)
- Iconic Awards, Practice of the Year (2017)
- BCO Awards, Best of Best (2017)
- The Chicago Athenaeum International Architecture Award (2010)
- European Aluminium Award, Special Jury Prize for Innovation & Design (2009)
- World Architecture Festival, Interiors and Fit-Out Prize (2009)
- CAB Aluminium in Renovation Award UK, Overall Winner
- CAB Aluminium in Renovation Award UK, Special Prize
- Leading European Architects Forum, LEAF Awards
- The Chicago Athenaeum International Architecture Award

On 19 March 2017, Levete was featured as a "castaway" on the Radio 4 programme, Desert Island Discs.

== Personal life ==
Levete and the Czech architect Jan Kaplický became acquainted in the 1980s, and married in 1991. They had a son named Josef in 1995, and divorced in 2006. From 1989 to 2009, Levete and Kaplický collaborated professionally.

Since 2007, Levete has been married to Ben Evans, the director of the London Design Festival.
