= Roy Thomas Severn =

British civil engineer and earthquake engineering expert

Professor Roy Thomas Severn CBE FREng FICE
- Born: 6 September 1929; Hucknall, Nottinghamshire
- Died: 25 November 2012 (aged 83)
- Education: Deacon's School & Great Yarmouth Grammar School
- Alma mater: Royal College of Science
- Occupation: Civil engineer
- Known for: President of the Institution of Civil Engineers

Roy Thomas Severn (6 September 1929 – 25 November 2012) was a British civil engineer and earthquake engineering expert. Severn studied mathematics at Imperial College London and achieved a doctorate in civil engineering based upon his work on the design of Dukan Dam. After completing his National Service he accepted a position as lecturer in civil engineering at the University of Bristol, where he would spend the rest of his career. Severn specialised in earthquake engineering and established the Earthquake Engineering Research Centre at the university which became one of the foremost institutions in the world within the field. He served as pro-vice chancellor of the university and as president of the Institution of Civil Engineers.

== Early life and army service ==
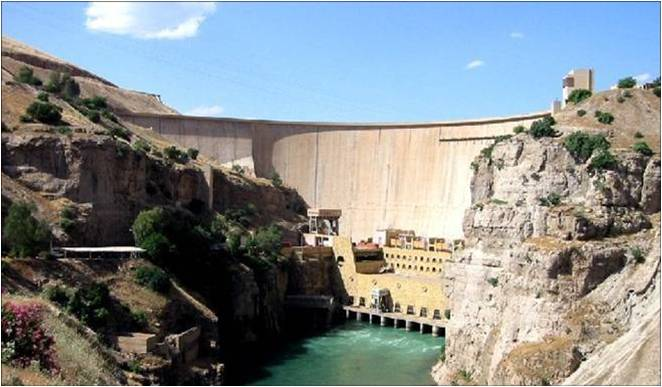
Dukan Dam

Severn was born in Hucknall in Nottinghamshire on 6 September 1929. His father was originally a coal miner before he found work at the Hucknall co-operative shop and later became manager of the Great Yarmouth branch. Severn was educated at Deacon's School, Peterborough and Great Yarmouth Grammar School before gaining a place at the Royal College of Science (RCS), part of the Imperial College London, to study mathematics.

Severn was a keen sportsman whilst a student and played cricket, rugby and football. Whilst playing for Wasps (Rugby) Football Club he met Professor Sammy Sparkes, also of Imperial College, who persuaded him to study civil engineering as a post-graduate, and also Deryck Norman de Garrs Allen, who became his PhD supervisor. Allen, who had studied under Sir Richard V. Southwell, was asked by Geoffrey Binnie's engineering consultancy to apply Southwell's equation-solving techniques to the design of the Dukan Dam in Iraq. Allen involved Severn in the project, as part of which the pair visited several arch dams and spent a significant amount of time solving complex design equations on mechanical calculators via relaxation methods. The project formed the basis of Severn's doctoral thesis.

Severn was required to serve in the British Army under the National Service programme and carried this out as an officer in the Royal Engineers. Entering as an officer cadet in 1954 he was commissioned as a second lieutenant on 4 June 1955. Severn studied at the Royal School of Military Survey in Curridge, Berkshire and served in Egypt, Cyprus and Aden before his service ended and he was placed in the Army Emergency Reserve of Officers on 29 September 1956. He was promoted to lieutenant in the reserve on 25 January 1957, and remained eligible for recall until he retired (with permission to retain use of his rank) on 1 April 1967.

== University of Bristol ==
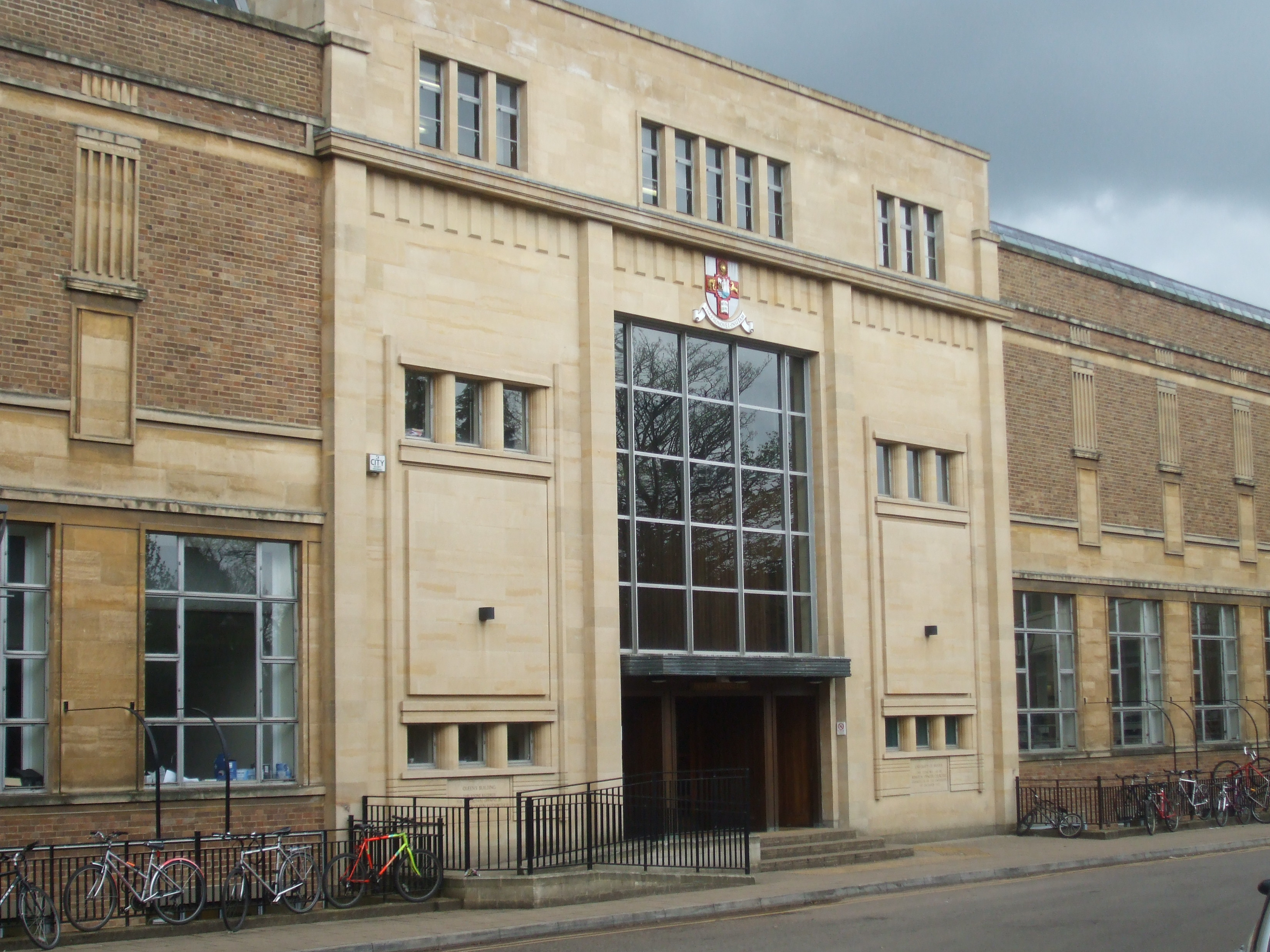
Faculty of Engineering at Bristol

After he was demobilised from the army Severn, who decided he did not wish to work as a mathematician, entered upon a career in civil engineering academia and was appointed to lecture at the University of Bristol by Sir Alfred Pugsley, who was then professor of Civil Engineering. Within a year of working there he had met and married Hilary Saxton. The appointment of Alfred Pippard, a proponent of structural analysis, as president of the Institution of Civil Engineers (ICE), led to the establishment of the institution's Arch Dams Committee to remedy a perceived lack of experience in the field. Sir Thomas Paton was installed by Pippard as head of the committee and Severn was appointed its most junior member. Paton recognised Severn's mathematical abilities and recommended that he apply himself to the study of earthquakes, which he described as the "most mathematical task of all". This field would become Severn's primary interest for the remainder of his career.

Puglsey left Bristol in 1968 and Severn was appointed his successor as professor and head of department, a move that was viewed with surprise by some contemporaries owing to Severn's youth – he was 38 years-old at the time of his appointment. Severn continued his focus on the effects of earthquakes upon dams, particularly embankment dams which were widespread in the hydro-electric power stations being constructed during this period and outnumbered the previously dominant arch dams by ten to one in new construction. The accurate modelling of embankment dams is difficult due to their mix of rocks and soil and little work had been carried out previously on their reaction to dynamic loading, such as was exerted by earthquakes. Severn was a proponent of the use of finite element analysis in the modelling of such dams and pioneered the application of early digital computers to this task. In the late 1970s Severn installed a 2m by 1m shaking table at Bristol and used it to derive a set of guidelines for the design of earthquake resistance in embankment dams, they were the first of their kind in the world. Severn's table was computer controlled and used a series of eccentricly-mounted weights to exert forces upon embankment dam models that he constructed of sand and wax. He refined his models using real-world data collected from a dam in Wales. Under Severn's direction Bristol's Department of Civil Engineering became the top-rated such department in the world and his Earthquake Engineering Research Centre, the largest institution of its kind in the UK, was internationally renowned.

== International renown ==
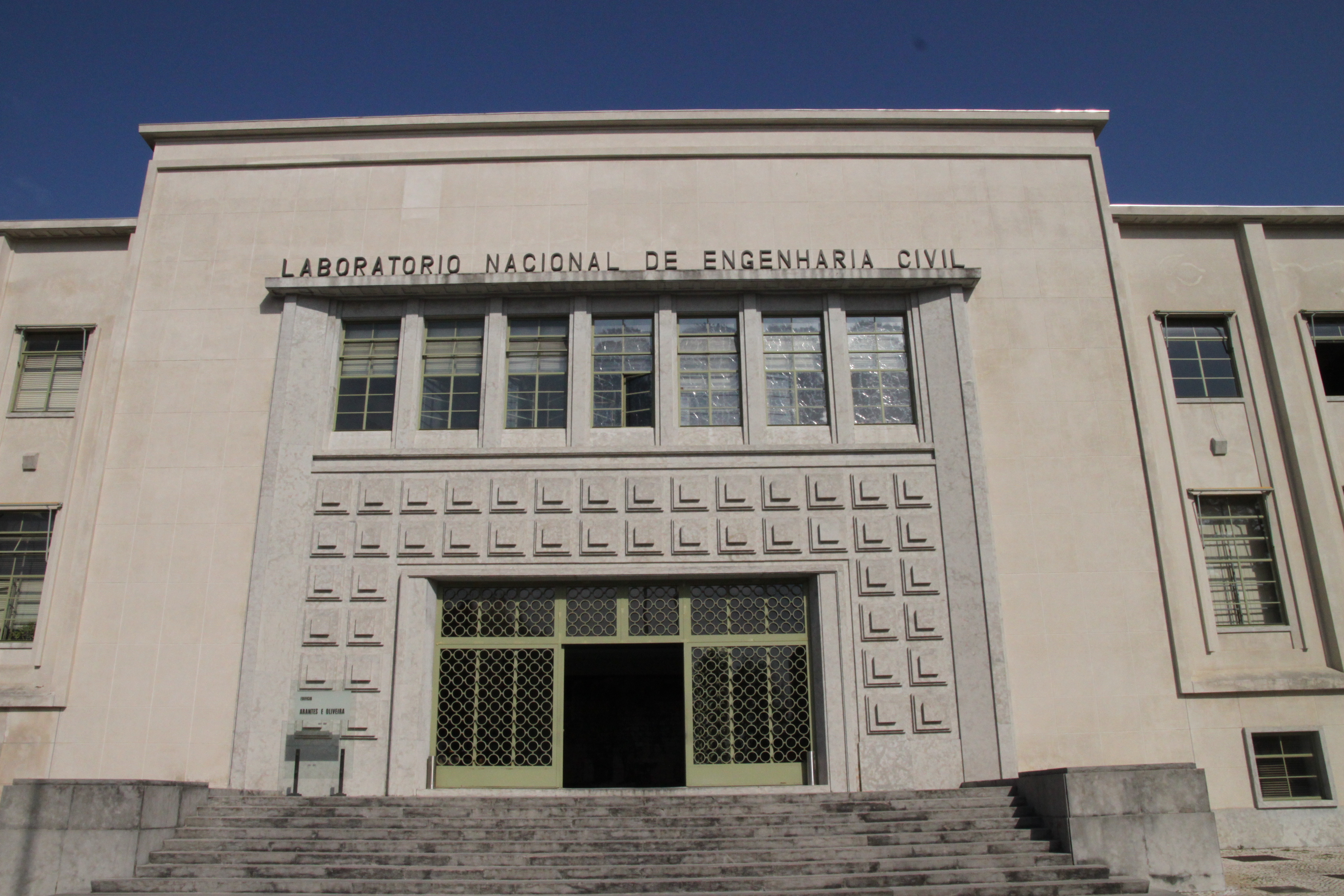
The Laboratório Nacional de Engenharia Civil

Severn became a fellow of the Royal Academy of Engineering in 1981 and, in the same year, received the ICE Telford Medal for a paper co-written with two members of the Building Research Station. He served as pro-vice chancellor of Bristol University from 1981 to 1984 (having served two periods as dean of the faculty of engineering). Severn insisted on remaining involved with the teaching of students and for many years led the teaching of basic structural engineering to first-year students. He was appointed chairman of the Seismic Effects Committee of the International Commission on Large Dams in 1982 and in 1984 was appointed to the Science and Engineering Research Council's Civil Engineering Committee. At SERC Severn established the Earthquake Engineering Field Investigation Team which continues to send British engineers to every major earthquake to study the effects on structures. In 1984 he was able to use a SERC grant to establish a large-scale shaking table at Bristol as part of an initiative to allow earthquake-struck countries gain access to British expertise. This improved table was computer-controlled and driven by six hydraulic rams operating in all three rotational and three translational axes. Severn was invited by the European Commission to co-ordinate the improvement and calibration of new shaking tables at the Laboratório Nacional de Engenharia Civil in Lisbon, Portugal the Istituto Sperimentale Modelli E Strutture in Italy and a facility in Athens.

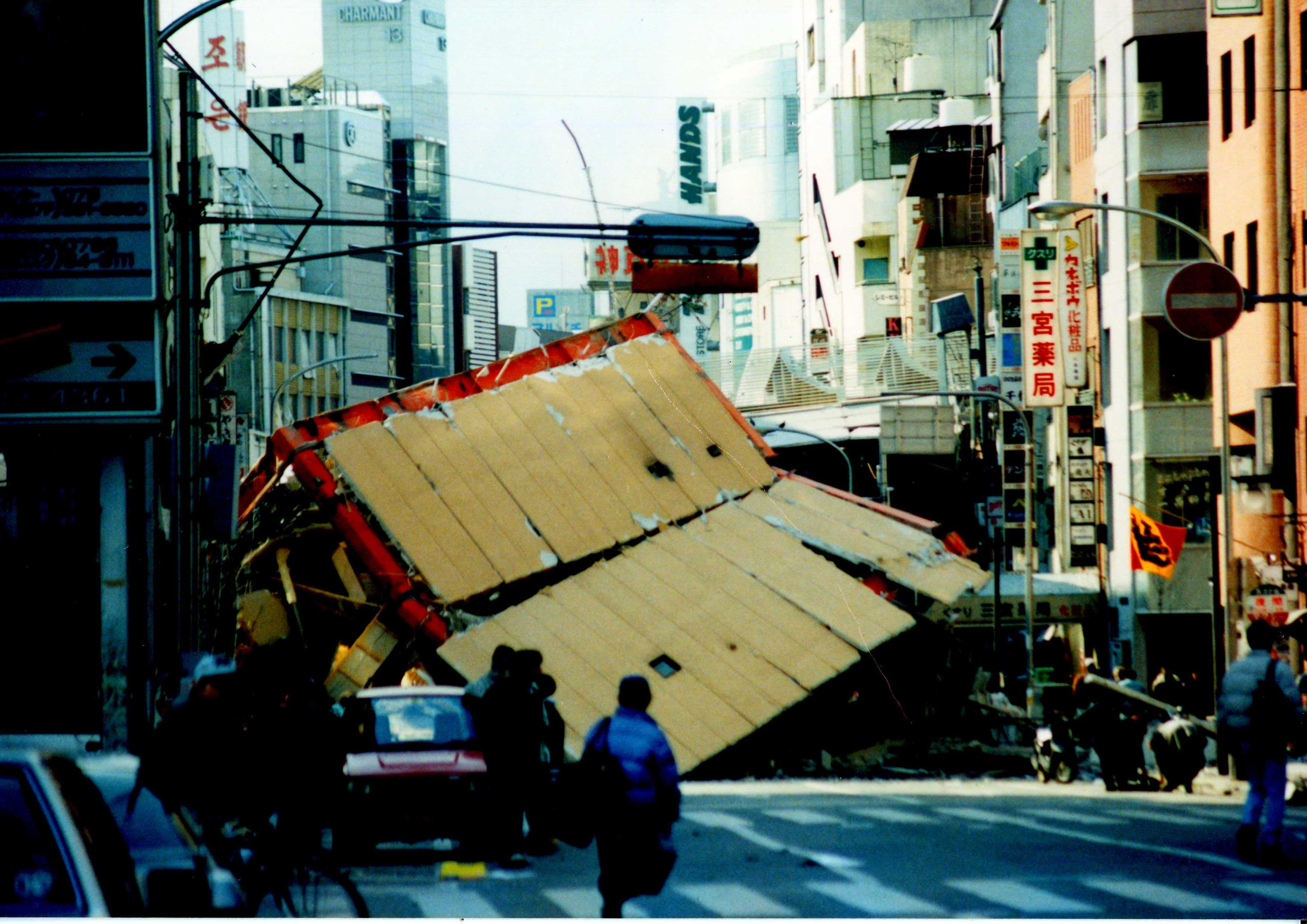
Damage resulting from the Kobe earthquake

Severn was elected president of the ICE for the November 1990 to November 1991 session and was heavily involved in the running of the ICE's South-West region. Severn was appointed a Commander of the Order of the British Empire in 1992 for his services to civil engineering and in January 1995 he led a team of European experts to carry out a detailed study of structural failures that occurred during and after the Kobe earthquake. Following his retirement from the university later in 1995 was granted the position of Emeritus Professor of Civil Engineering. In 1997, Severn delivered the sixth Mallet-Milne memorial lecture (entitled Structural Response Prediction Using Experimental Data) for the Society for Earthquake and Civil Engineering Dynamics, in London. Severn authored several books including a history of Victorian engineering and a discussion of structural modelling. His last major project was a book on the history of engineering at Bristol to mark the faculty's centenary in 2009, he funded this himself and donated the royalties to establish a university scholarship fund.

Severn died on 25 November 2012. A memorial service for Severn was held on 1 March 2013 at the University of Bristol, in a lecture theatre named after Pugsley, his former mentor, and including tours of the latest shaking tables in the Bristol laboratories.

Professional and academic associations
Preceded by Peter Frank Stott	President of the Institution of Civil Engineers; November 1990 – November 1991	Succeeded by Robin Lee Wilson
