= Robert Marshall (civil servant) =

British civil servant

Sir Robert Braithwaite Marshall, KCB, MBE (10 January 1920 – 25 December 2000) was a British civil servant.

Born in Kent on 10 January 1920, the son of an officer in the Indian Civil Service, he spent large parts of his childhood in Switzerland. He attended Sherborne School and Corpus Christi College, Cambridge, and spent the Second World War at Bletchley Park (described as "Foreign Office temp. appointment" in Who's Who) where his fluency in French and German were put to good use in the RAF intelligence section. He was appointed an MBE for his work.

Returning to Cambridge after the war to finish his degree, he graduated with a degree in economics and entered HM Civil Service as an official in the Ministry of Works. He moved to the Cabinet Office in 1950 and then returned to the Ministry of Works in 1953. He was subsequently at the Ministry of Aviation from 1962 to 1966, the Ministry of Power from 1966 to 1969 and the Ministry of Technology from 1969 to 1970. From 1970 to 1973, he was Secretary for Industry in the new Department of Trade and Industry. He was then Second Permanent Secretary at the Department of the Environment from 1973 to 1978 and then Chairman of the National Water Council from 1978 to 1982. He was heavily involved in the establishment of WaterAid in 1981. He died on 25 December 2000. He had been appointed a Companion of the Order of the Bath in 1968 and promoted to Knight Commander in 1971.
