= Selfridges Birmingham =

Department store in Birmingham

Selfridges Building
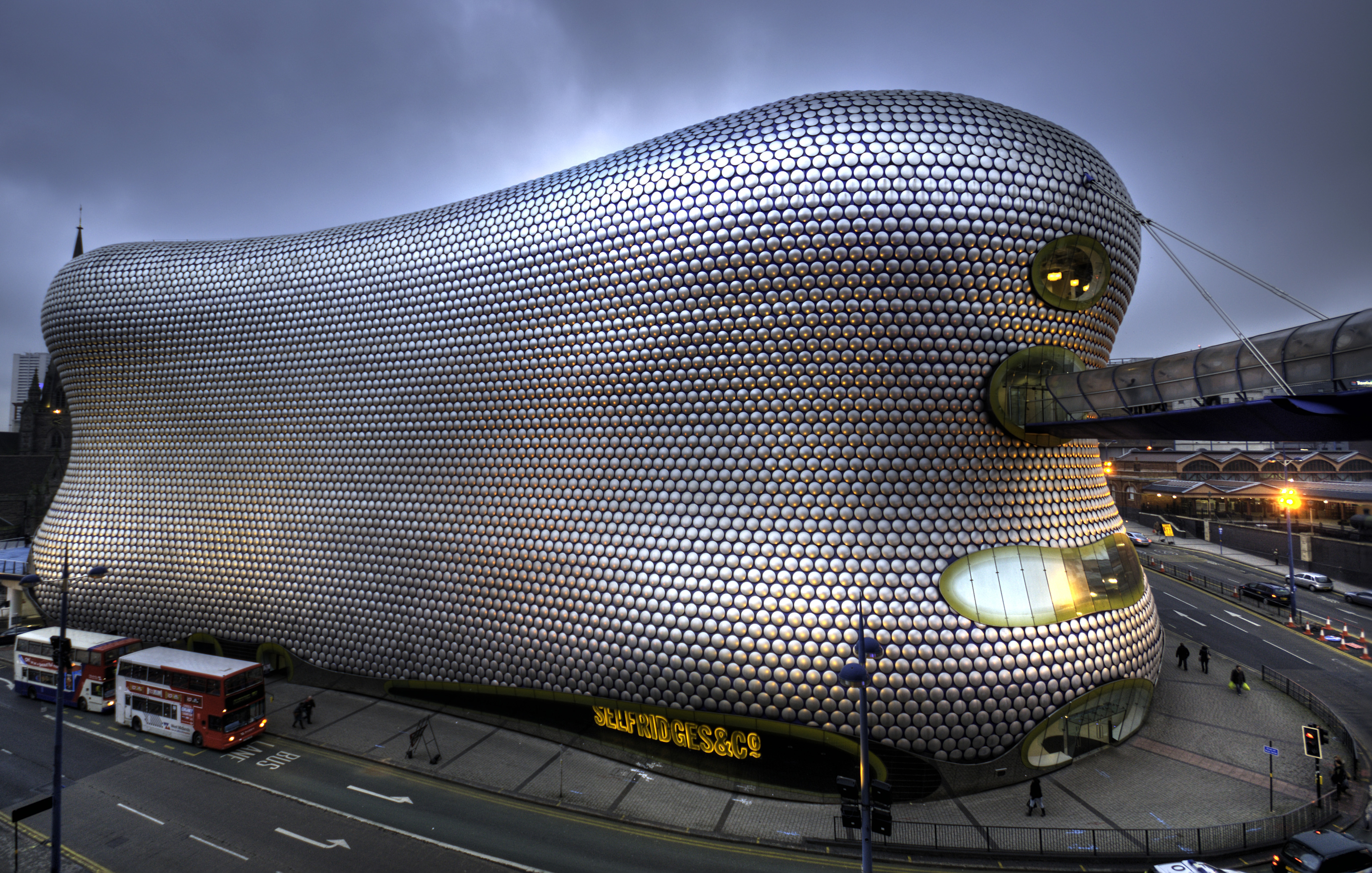
- View from Park St car park
- Interactive map of the Selfridges Building area

General information
- Type: Department Store
- Architectural style: Blobitecture
- Location: Park Street, Birmingham, England
- Coordinates: 52°28′40.02″N 1°53′32.13″W
- Construction started: 1999
- Completed: September 2003
- Cost: £60 million
- Owner: Selfridges & Co.

Technical details
- Structural system: Steel framework with sprayed concrete facade
- Floor count: 6
- Floor area: 14,864m² (160,000sq ft)

Design and construction
- Architects: Jan Kaplický, Amanda Levete
- Architecture firm: Future Systems
- Structural engineer: Ove Arup & Partners
- Services engineer: Ove Arup & Partners
- Main contractor: Laing O'Rourke

The Selfridges Building is a building in Birmingham, England. The building is part of the Bullring Shopping Centre and houses Selfridges Department Store. The building was completed in 2003 at a cost of £60 million and designed by the architecture firm Future Systems. It has a steel framework with sprayed concrete facade. It is one of the backgrounds as part of the Architecture theme in Windows 7.

== Architecture ==
The architecture firm Future Systems were appointed by Selfridge's then chief executive, Vittorio Radice, to design only the third store outside London. Although Selfridges was physically integrated with the Bullring Shopping Centre the client wanted a distinct design approach which would set the store apart from the rest of the development and become an instantly recognisable signpost for the brand. The building's facade is curved, wrapping around the corner of Moor Street and Park Street. The facade comprises 15,000 anodised aluminium discs mounted on a blue background, in an architectural form which has become known as Blobitecture.

== Awards ==
- RIBA Award for Architecture 2004
- Concrete Society Awards, Overall Winner 2004
- British Constructional Steelwork Association's Structural Steel Awards 2004
- Royal Fine Art Commission Trust, Retail Innovation 2004
- Institution of Civil Engineers, Project Award Winner 2004
- Civic Trust Award 2004
- Retail Week Awards, Retail Destination of the Year 2004

== Gallery ==
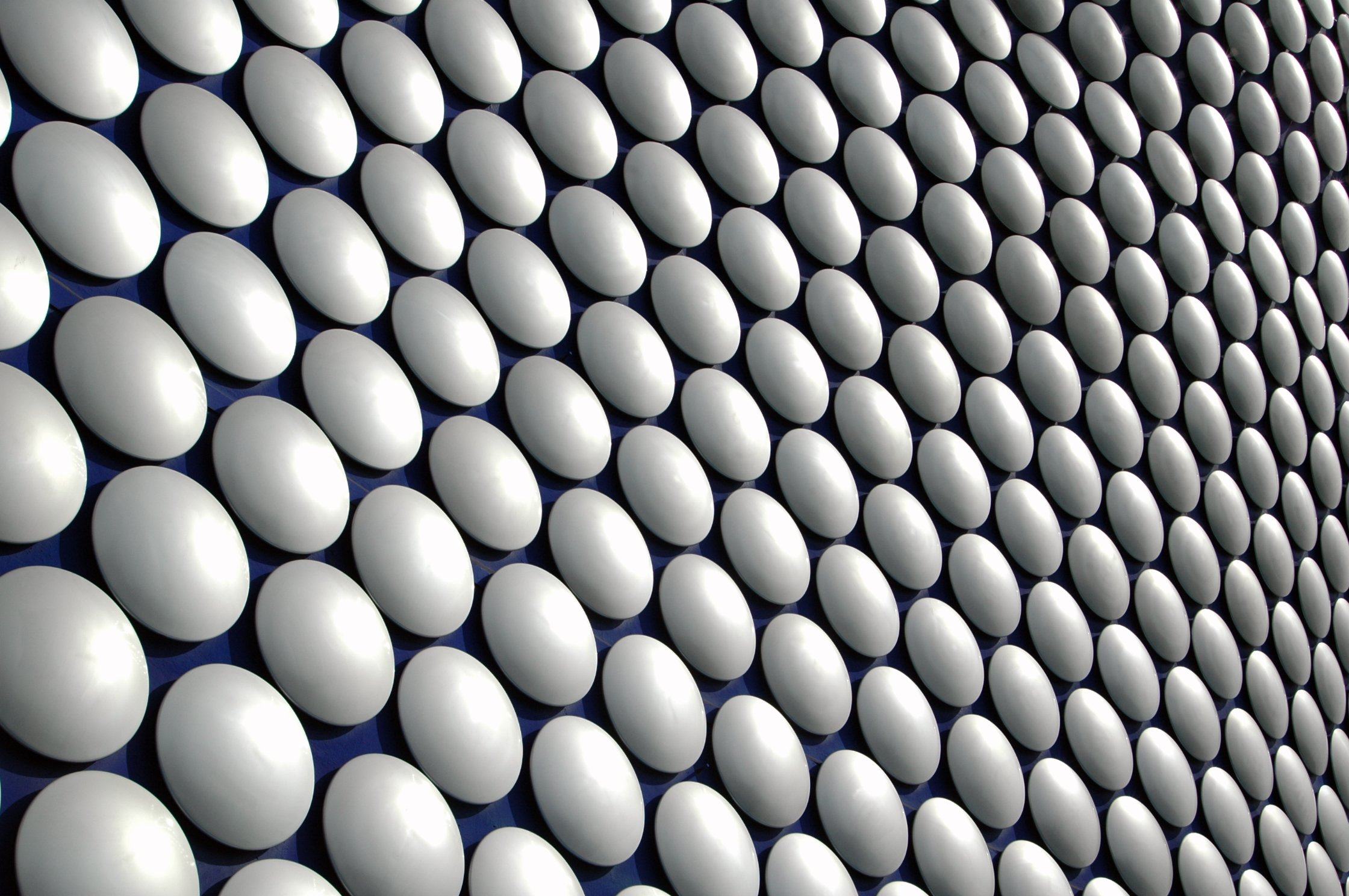
Detail of aluminium disc cladding

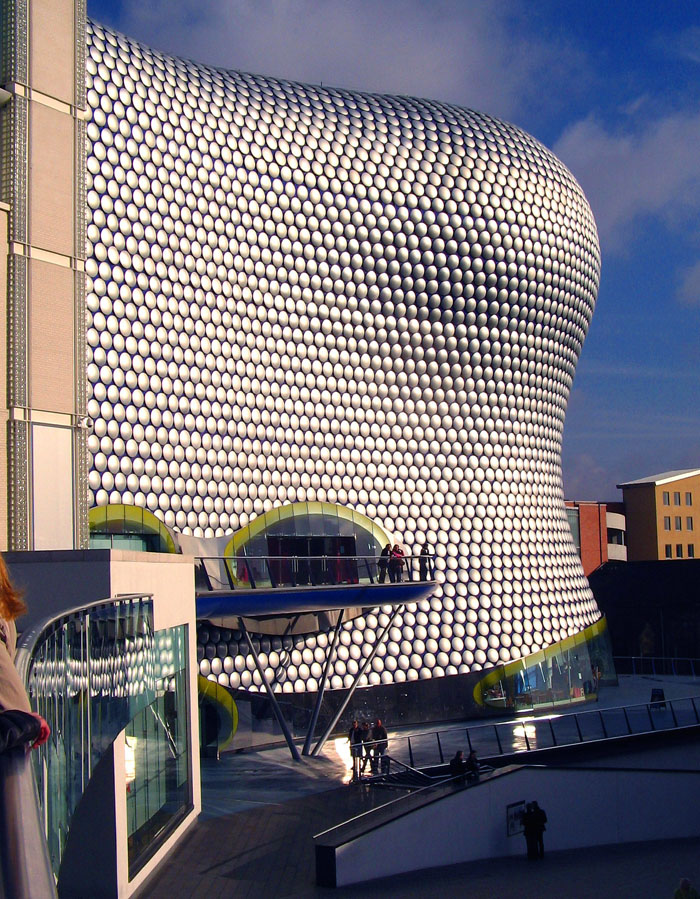
View from the Bull Ring

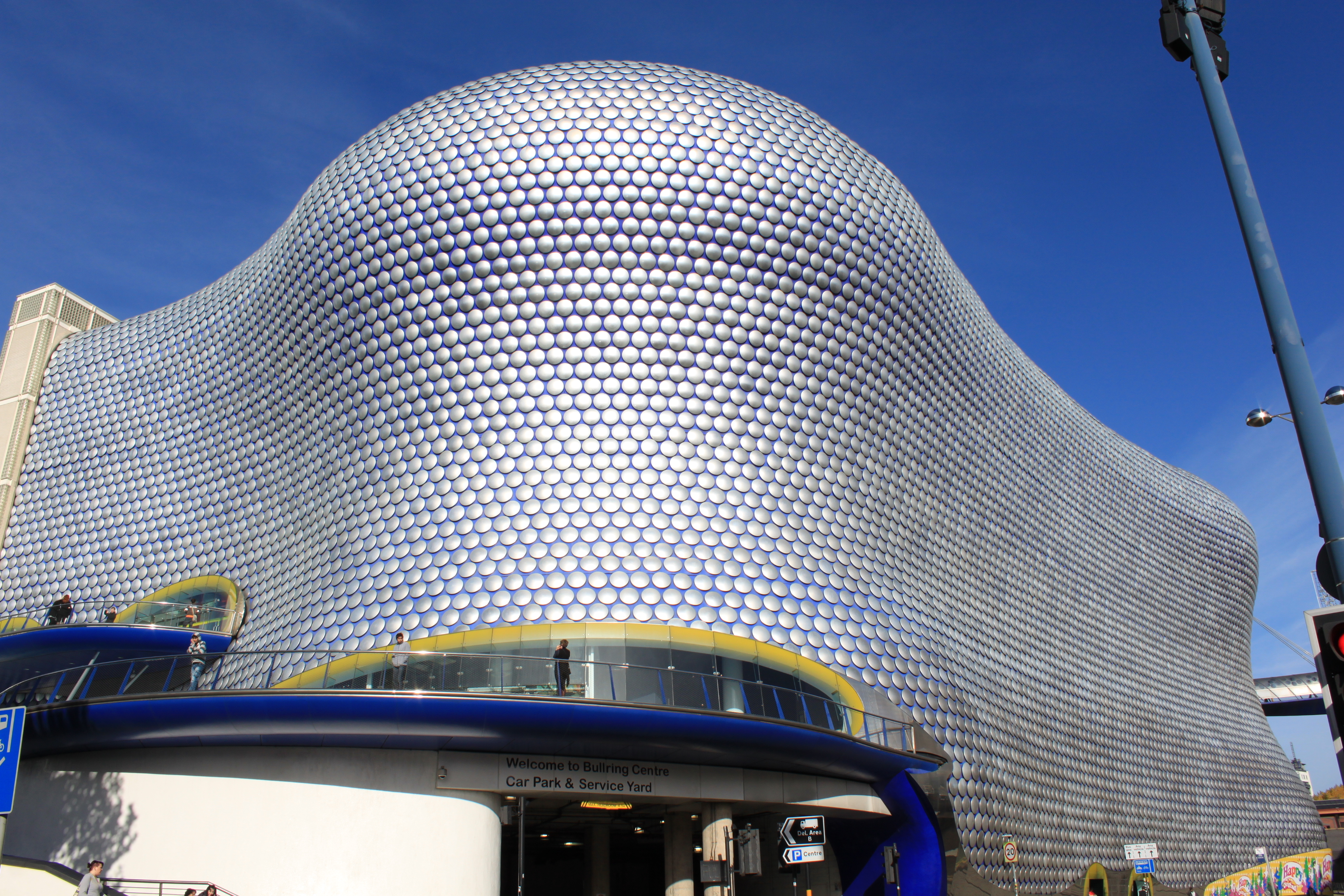
Road level view of building

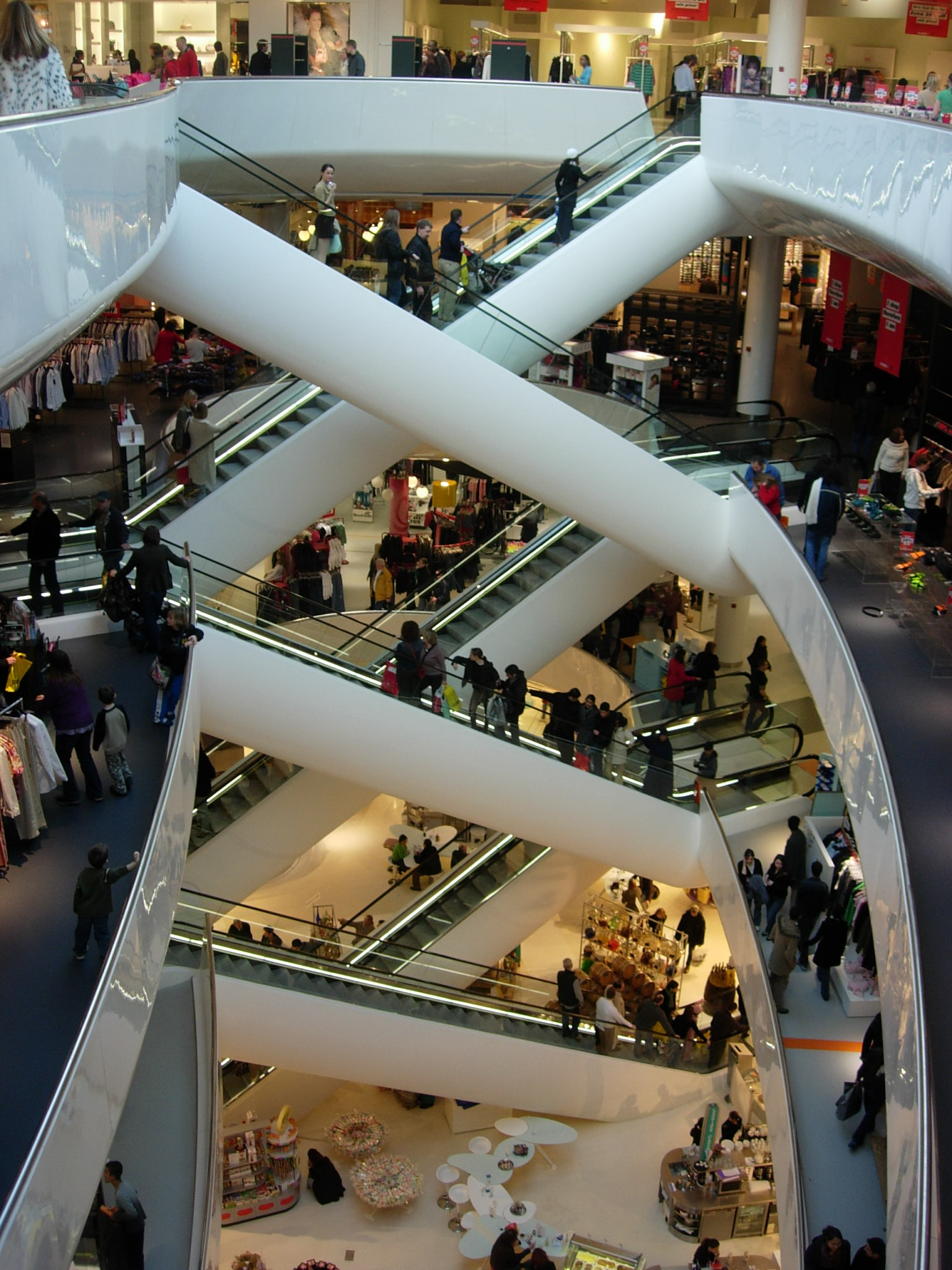
Interior escalators

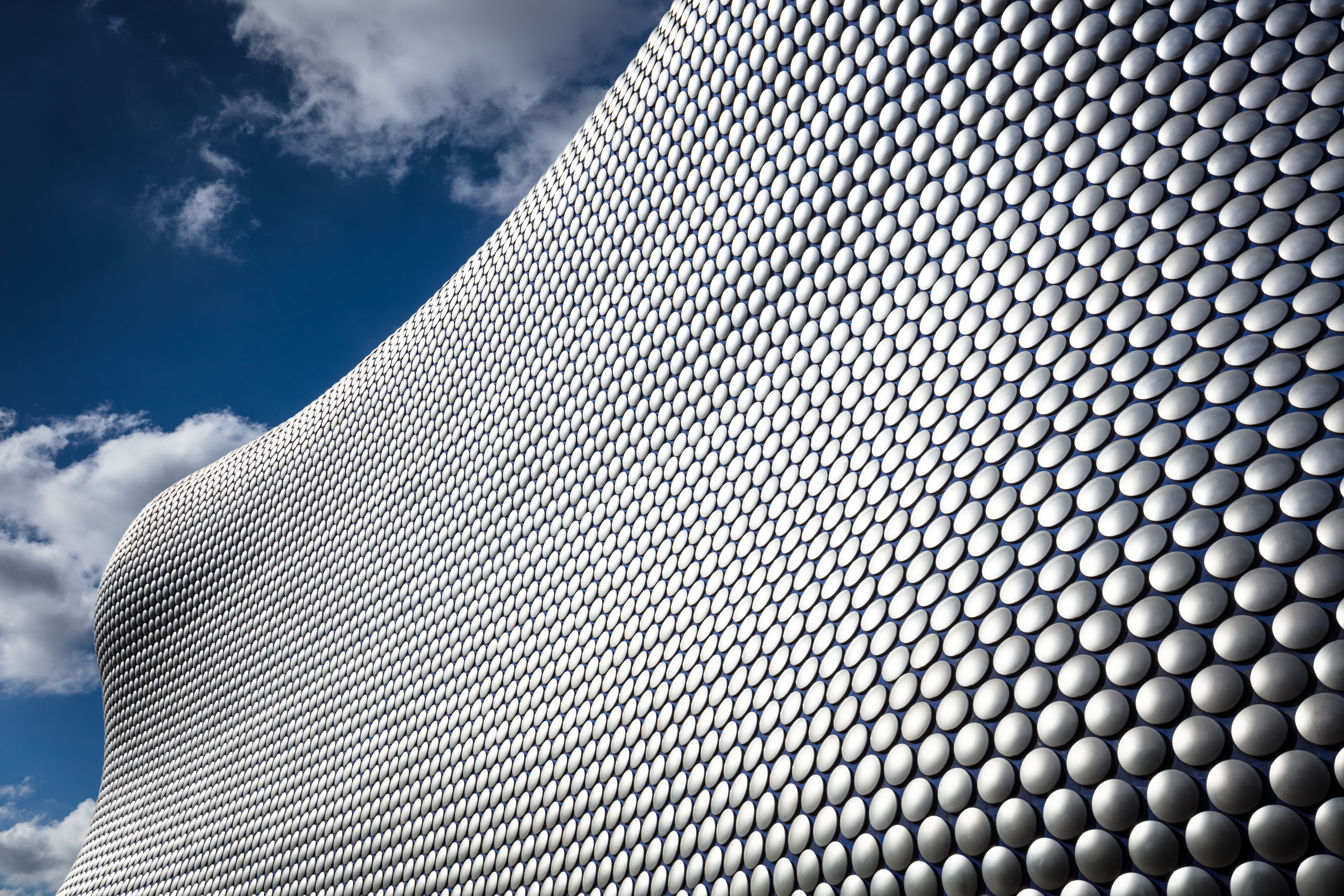
Side view of the building
