= Pantages Tower =

Residential skyscrapers in Toronto

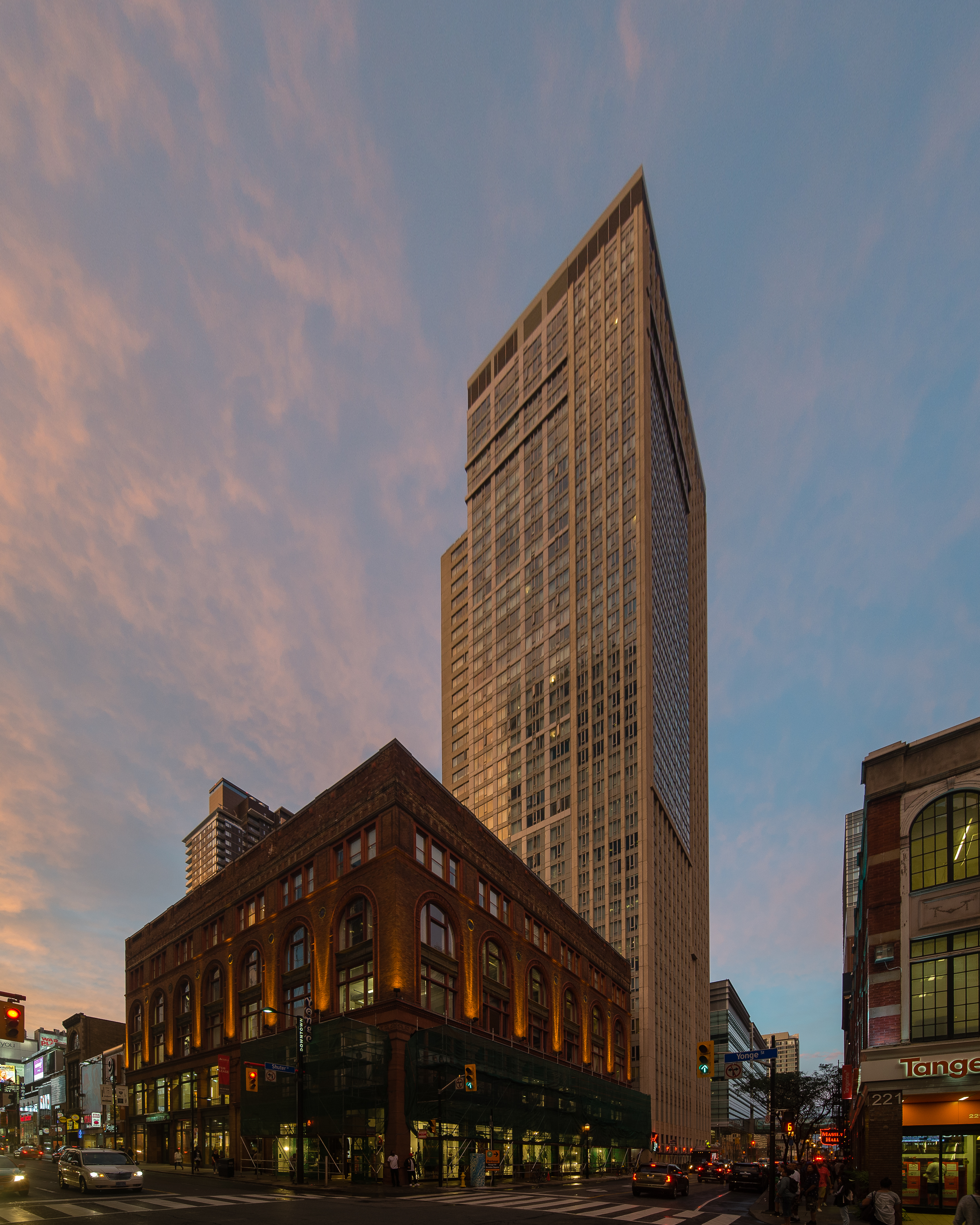
- Interactive map of Pantages Tower

General information
- Status: Completed
- Type: Residential, Hotel
- Coordinates: 43.655°N 79.379°W
- Completed: 2003

Technical details
- Floor count: 45

Pantages Tower is a condominium and boutique hotel at 200-210 Victoria Street in Toronto, Ontario, Canada. The building is located near the Ed Mirvish Theatre at 244 Victoria Street, which opened in 1920 as the Pantages Theater. The hotel is known as the Pantages Hotel, and its main entrance is situated at 200 Victoria Street. The condo units are in 210 Victoria.

At 139.6 metres and 45 floors, the glass tower was completed in 2003. The Postmodern tower was designed by Moshe Safdie and Core Architects Inc for developers Dundee Corp and Intracorp.

== History ==
The tower takes its name from Greek-born vaudeville impresario Alexander Pantages.

The initial proposal for the site called for a second theatre to be built, with an adjoining hotel to also be included. It was the financial collapse of Livent that caused the plans to be dropped.

== Education ==
The tower is assigned to the following schools:

- Toronto District School Board: Market Lane Public School (Kindergarten through 8th Grade) and Jarvis Collegiate Institute
  - Technical school: Central Technical School
  - Commercial school: Central Commerce Collegiate or Northern Secondary School (Residents may attend either school)
