= Richard Nugent, Baron Nugent of Guildford =

British Conservative politician

George Richard Hodges Nugent, Baron Nugent of Guildford, Bt PC JP FRSA (6 June 1907 – 16 March 1994), known as Sir Richard Nugent, 1st Baronet between 1960 and 1966, was a British Conservative politician.

== Background ==
Nugent was the son of Colonel George Roubiliac Hodges Nugent and his wife Violet Stella, daughter of Henry Theopphilus Sheppard. He was educated at the Imperial Service College and went then to the Royal Military Academy, Woolwich.

== Career ==
In 1926, Nugent was commissioned into the Royal Artillery, leaving it after three years. He joined the County Council for Surrey in 1944 and became an alderman in 1951, representing the county later as a Justice of the Peace. Nugent entered the British House of Commons in 1950, sitting as a Member of Parliament (MP) for Guildford until 1966. He became Parliamentary Secretary to the Ministry of Agriculture and Fisheries in 1951, an office he held until 1957. Subsequently, he served as Parliamentary Secretary to the Ministry of Transport until October 1959. Nugent was created a Baronet, of Dunsfold in the County of Surrey, on 27 January 1960 and was sworn of the Privy Council in 1962. He received a life peerage with the title Baron Nugent of Guildford, of Dunsfold in the County of Surrey on 31 May 1966.

In 1944, Nugent became a member of the National Farmers Union's executive council and in 1948 a vice-chairman of the National Federation of Young Farmers' Clubs, occupying both posts until 1951. He chaired the Thames Conservancy Board for fourteen years from 1960 and was nominated a Fellow of the Royal Society of Arts in 1962. Two years later, he became chairman of the Animal Virus Research Institute until 1977. Nugent became the first chairman of the National Water Council in 1973, resigning after five years. He was president of the Royal Society for the Prevention of Accidents (RoSPA) and in 1981 he succeeded in introducing seat belt legislation through an amendment to the Transport Bill.

== Family ==
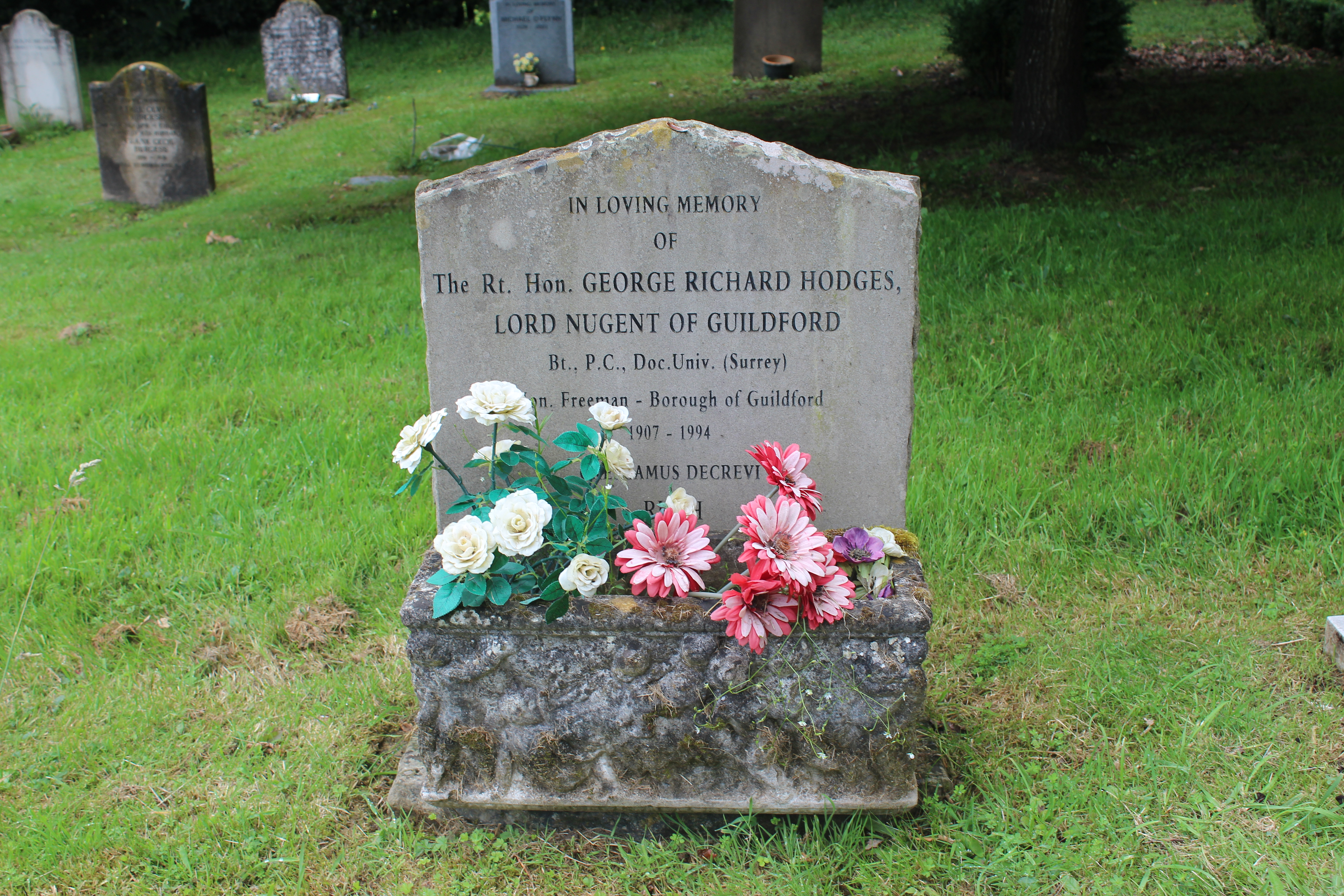
Grave in Dunsfold, Surrey

On 29 July 1937, Nugent married Ruth Stafford, daughter of Hugh Granville Stafford. He and his wife were both awarded honorary doctorates by the University of Surrey in December 1968. Nugent died at Dunsfold in 1994.

== Arms ==
Coat of arms of Richard Nugent, Baron Nugent of Guildford
Coronet Coronet of a baron Crest A Cockatrice with wings expanded Vert charged with a Rose Argent barbed and seeded proper Escutcheon Ermine two Bars Gules a Canton of the last Supporters Dexter: a Cockatrice wings addorsed Vert beaked combed and wattled Gules; Sinister: a Swan wings addorsed Argent, each gorged with a Collar Or charged with thee Crescents Sable Motto Degrevi (I have resolved)

Parliament of the United Kingdom
Preceded by Sir John Jarvis, Bt	Member of Parliament for Guildford; 1950–1966	Succeeded by David Howell
Political offices
Preceded by Arthur Champion; The Earl of Listowel	Parliamentary Secretary to the Ministry of Agriculture and Fisheries; 1951–1957; With: The Lord Carrington 1951–1954; The Earl St Aldwyn 1954–1957; Harmar Nicholls 1955–1957; Bill Deedes 1955–1957	Succeeded by The Earl St Aldwyn; Joseph Godber as Parliamentary Secretary to the Ministry of Agriculture, Fisheries and Food
Preceded by Hugh Molson; John Profumo	Parliamentary Secretary to the Ministry of Transport; 1957–1959; With: Airey Neave 1957–1959; John Hay Jan – Oct 1959	Succeeded by John Hay; The Lord Chesham
Baronetage of the United Kingdom
New creation	Baronet (of Dunsfold); 1960–1994	Extinct
