= Peter Snow (artist) =

English painter

Peter Frederick Briscoe Snow
- Born: 6 June 1927
- Died: 29 August 2008 (aged 81)
- Education: Slade School of Fine Art
- Known for: painting, theatre design
- Father: Frederick Snow

Peter Frederick Briscoe Snow (6 June 1927–August 29 2008) was an English painter, theatre designer and teacher. From the 1960s to the 1990s he was head of postgraduate theatre design at the Slade School of Fine Art, with the help of Nicholas Georgiadis and later, Yolanda Sonnabend.

== Life and work ==
Peter Snow, son of Frederick Snow, was educated at Bloxham School in Oxfordshire, where he showed an early talent for painting and was involved in designing sets for school plays. In 1946, he studied briefly at Goldsmiths College and worked as a journalist on the South London Press before doing his national service with the Royal Engineers in the Middle East. Following his time in the army he gained a scholarship to the Slade School of Fine Art, studying until 1953 and joining the staff in 1957. He was head of theatre design, succeeding Robert Medley.

Snow started working in theatre in 1951, when he designed Love's Labour's Lost for the Southwark Shakespeare Festival. In 1954, Snow worked alongside Joan Littlewood at her Theatre Workshop in Stratford East. Two of his most admired designs for Littlewood were for a revival of John Marston's The Dutch Courtesan. Other early theatre work included designs for Lennox Berkeley's one-act opera A Dinner Engagement at the Aldeburgh Festival in 1954, Frederick Ashton's ballet Variations on a Theme by Purcell at the Royal Opera House in 1955, and Noël Coward's South Sea Bubble, at the Lyric Theatre in 1956. In 1955, Snow designed the British premiere of Samuel Beckett's Waiting for Godot, directed by Peter Hall at the Arts Theatre, where he also designed the costumes.

Snow's first solo exhibition as a painter was at the Prospect Gallery in London in 1951, followed by a show at the Beaux Arts in 1957. Following a trip to New York City in 1970, Snow held some of his most vivid painting and two multi-media entertainments, Reflections. These were held at Oval House in south London in 1971 and at the Institute of Contemporary Arts in 1975.

Snow designed a BBC film about Rex Whistler in 1978 and continued to exhibit regularly at the Beaux Arts and, after it closed down, the Piccadilly and Albemarle galleries. His occasional portraits included studies of Joan Littlewood and Richard Eyre, the film and theatre directors, which hang in the National Portrait Gallery.

== Family and death ==
In 1963 Snow married Maria Wirth, an Australian colour consultant and interior designer; they had a daughter, Selina, in 1965, who also became a painter. Wirth died in 2017. Towards the end of his life Snow suffered from Alzheimer's disease. He died 29 August 2008.
