= Reinforced Concrete Association =

The Reinforced Concrete Association was a British engineering organisation. Many important British buildings in the twentieth century were made from reinforced concrete.

== Function ==
It produced the journal Structural Concrete.

=== Presidents ===
- 1956–57, Sir Frederick Snow

== Structure ==
In the 1930s it has headquartered on Dartmouth Street in London, then moved to Petty France, London in the 1950s.
