= National Water Council =

- Company type: Government body
- Industry: Water supply
- Founded: 1973
- Defunct: 1983
- Fate: Dissolved
- Successor: Water Authorities Association; Water Industry Training Association; British Water International
- Headquarters: London
- Key people: Lord Nugent of Guildford (chair 1973–78), Sir Robert Marshall (chair 1978–83)
- Services: Advice on water supply policy
- Number of employees: 400

The National Water Council (NWC) was a statutory body of the UK Government responsible for overseeing matters of common interest within the water industry and serving as a link between the government and the Water Authorities. It was founded in 1973 and ceased its operations in 1983.

== Establishment ==
The NWC was established in accordance with the provisions of the Water Act 1973. The Conservative Government, at the time, did not wish to have a national body with executive functions between ministers and the Water Authorities established by the Act. Instead, the NWC was tasked with representing industry and to be the main source of advice to the Government matters pertaining to water policy.

== Functions ==
The NWC was an advisory body to the Government and the newly established Water Authorities, offering guidance on matters related to national policies on water. It promoted the efficient performance of the Authorities and devised schemes for the testing and approval of water fittings. Additionally, the NWC played a pivotal role in overseeing education within the water industry. Furthermore, it managed the water industry pension scheme and was responsible for negotiating pay and conditions of employment.

== Constitution ==
The NWC comprised a chairman, appointed by the Government, the chairmen of the Water Authorities, and up to ten members nominated by the Government, including the chairman of the Water Space Amenity Commission. The first chairman of the NWC was Lord Nugent of Guildford (chair 1973–78), followed by Sir Robert Marshall (chair 1978–83). When first established the NWC had a staff of about 250, this had increased to about 400 when it was abolished.

== Achievements ==
During the drought in 1976 the NWC published adverts in the press identifying the measures that should be taken to reduce usage of water.

In 1977, the NWC published a classification scheme for river water quality. This ranged from 1A High Quality to 4 Bad quality.

== Abolition ==
By 1983 the Government indicated that the main work of the NWC had been achieved and that the Government had now a more direct relationship with the Water Authorities. Others observed that the NWC had done little to promote the views of the industry to Government. The NWC was abolished by the Water Act 1983. Its duties devolved to three non-statutory bodies: the Water Authorities Association; the Water Industry Training Association; and British Water International.

== Water Space Amenity Commission ==
The Water Space Amenity Commission was an independent arm of the NWC. It was established in 1973 with a duty to advise on recreational policy for water space in England. It acted as a bridge between the water industry and recreational interests. It approved and promoted schemes for recreational use. The chairman was John Humphries and there was about 25 staff. The commission was abolished by the Water Act 1983.
