= The Concrete Society =

Non-profit British company related to concrete

- Logo

- Coat of Arms
- Formation: 28 July 1966; 60 years ago
- Merger of: Reinforced Concrete Association; Prestressed Concrete Development Group; Pavings Development Group; Formwork Development Group
- Type: Non-profit
- Headquarters: Sandhurst, Berkshire, United Kingdom
- Key people: Sir Frederick Snow (First President); Peter Frank Stott (Second President)
- Website: www.concrete.org.uk

The Concrete Society is a UK based non-profit company that was founded in 1966 in response to the increasing need for a single organisation embracing all those interested in concrete. On its formal inauguration, on 13 October 1966, the society took over the work of the four organisations (the Reinforced Concrete Association, the Prestressed Concrete Development Group, the Pavings Development Group and the Formwork Development Group), by then in the process of dissolution, in order both to carry on their work and to extend it to cover the entire field of concrete technology and use.

Today The Concrete Society is an independent concrete advisory company, providing information to industry clients, architects, engineers, specifiers, suppliers, contractors and users of concrete. The society is an individual membership body, without trade affiliations, which exists to provide information to exchange information and experience and to promote concrete as a construction medium.

== Membership ==
The Concrete Society is an independent membership organisation bringing together all those with an interest in concrete. It allows members to exchange knowledge and experience across all disciplines.

== Concrete Magazine ==
As part of its services, the Concrete Society provides its members, and all interested parties, with its own publication. Concrete Magazine targets the global concrete industry by bringing stories from across the UK/Ireland. Concrete Engineering International (CEI) covers projects around the world, and is published every six months providing international features and articles covering the global concrete construction industry. The magazine is available in both digital and print version and is available to all the members of the society.

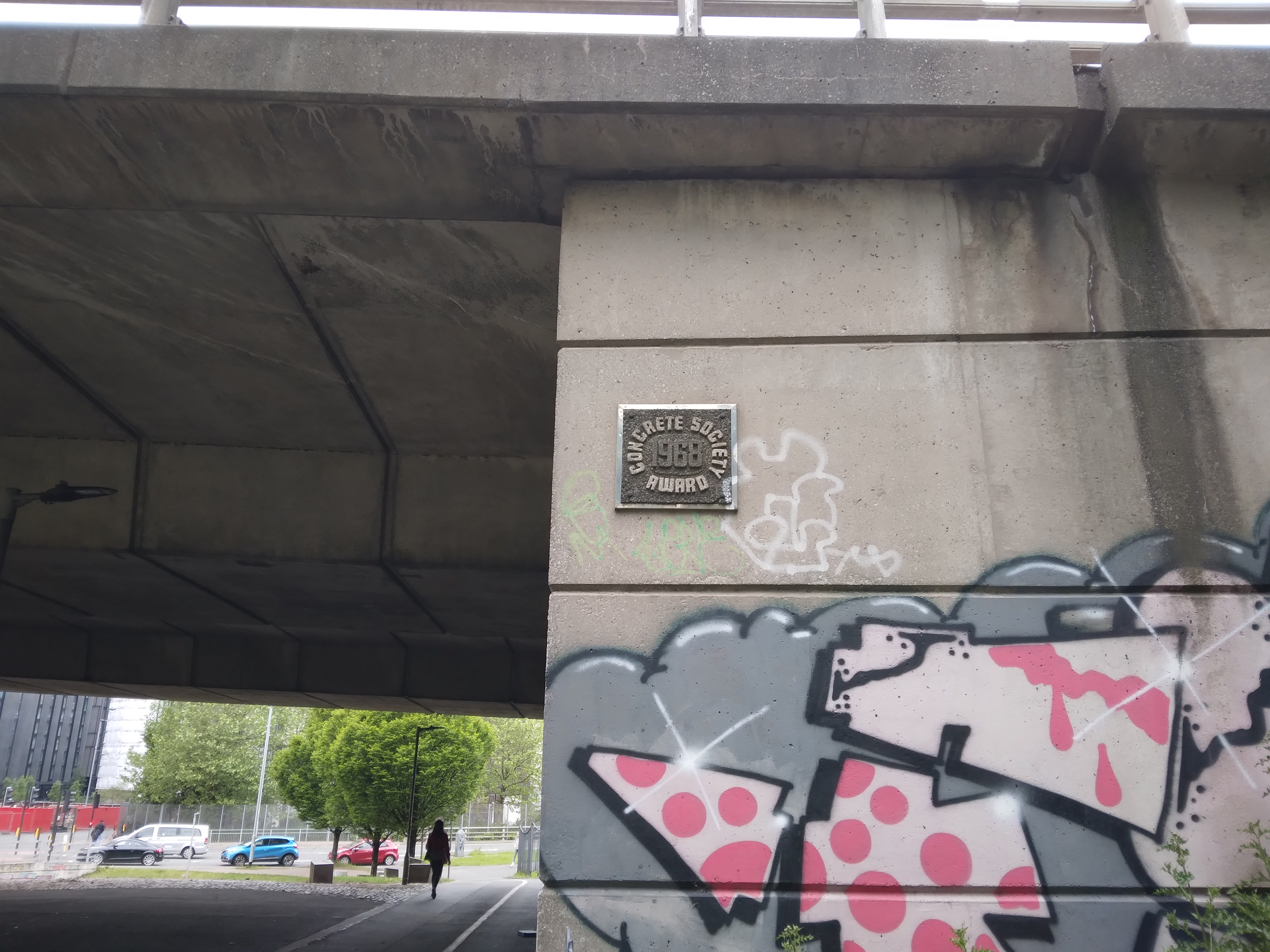
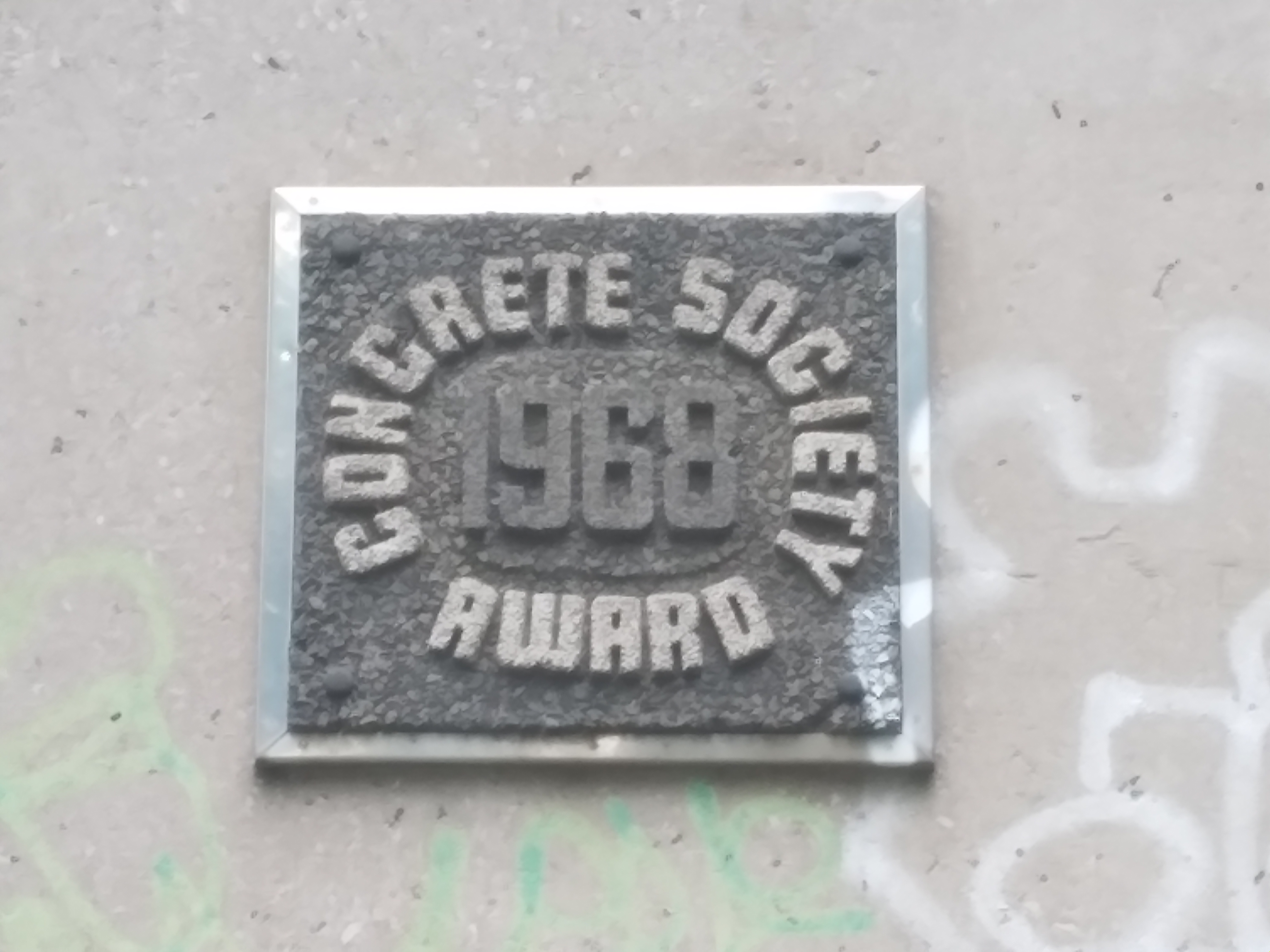
A 'Concrete Society 1968 Award' plaque on the side of the Mancunian Way elevated motorway in Manchester, England

== Trust ==
The Concrete Society Trust was established in 1965. Recently its main activity has been an annual awards competition for students studying a concrete related discipline, involving the assessment of research papers and theses.

Another trust was incorporated in 1969, The Joe Peirce Trust. It was initially established to provide an annual prize for the best candidate for the Advanced Concrete Technology. The next step of the Trust was to award travelling bursaries for the students interested in attending national and international conferences related to their field of study.

Since the number of suitable candidates has fallen significantly in recent years, it was decided to merge both trusts into a single body with a combined portfolio of awards, which led to formation of The Concrete Society Trust. Both parties agreed to keep the original awards, but broaden the scope by allowing the applicants to be at any stage of their career opposed to making it solely available to university students.

== Coat of arms ==
Coat of arms of The Concrete Society
Notes Granted 5 September 1967. Crest On a wreath Argent and Gules, out of a mural crown and in front of an annulet Or, a lion rampant Gules holding between the forepaws a snowflake Azure. Escutcheon Quarterly per fess wavy Or and Argent, an annulet between four lions rampant Gules; over all a fess wavy Sable surmounted by a pale Sable. Motto 'Concreti Corroboramur'

The arms were officially granted on September 5, 1967.

The shield shows a union of four quarters, Or (gold/yellow) representing fine and coarse aggregate and Argent (silver/white) representing cement. The wavy fess suggests water and the Sable (black) pale, reinforcement. The Gules (red) annulet is for the association of the elements of the Society, and the lions a symbol of strength. The four quarters also symbolise the four bodies that came together in the Society.

In the crest the mural crown is an emblem of building and architecture and the circle issuing from it and the lion repeat the symbolism of the shield while the snowflake brings in a personal touch, representing Sir Frederick Snow's role in the formation of the society.

The motto 'Concreti Corroboramur' means 'Having come together, we are strengthened'.
