= Frederick Snow =

British civil and structural engineer

Sir Frederick Snow
- Born: Frederick Sidney Snow; 14 February 1899; Lambeth, London, England
- Died: 5 June 1976 (aged 77); Eastbourne, Sussex, England
- Occupation: Structural engineer
- Known for: Reinforced concrete designer

Sir Frederick Sidney Snow CBE (14 February 1899 – 5 June 1976) was a civil and structural engineer. He was founder and senior partner of Frederick S. Snow and Partners, which became Sir Frederick Snow and partners.

Snow was born in London. He joined the Royal Artillery at the start of the First World War. He later served with the Royal Engineers and saw active service in France and Belgium, where he was twice wounded.

After the war he began work as an engineer for a number of companies. He specialised in the construction of heavy foundations and deep underpinnings, working on constructions such as Unilever House, South Africa House and The Kingsway Underpass London. He began his own practice as a consulting engineer in 1943, working particularly for the aviation industry and was the overall designer for Gatwick Airport in the 1950s. He was made a Commander of the Order of the British Empire on 12 June 1958.

He was the president of the Institution of Structural Engineers 1947-1948, and the first president of The Concrete Society. Snow was invested as a knight bachelor on 11 November 1965. He was the father of the Quantity Surveyor, Michael Snow and the artist, Peter Snow.
