= Future Systems =

Architectural and design practice

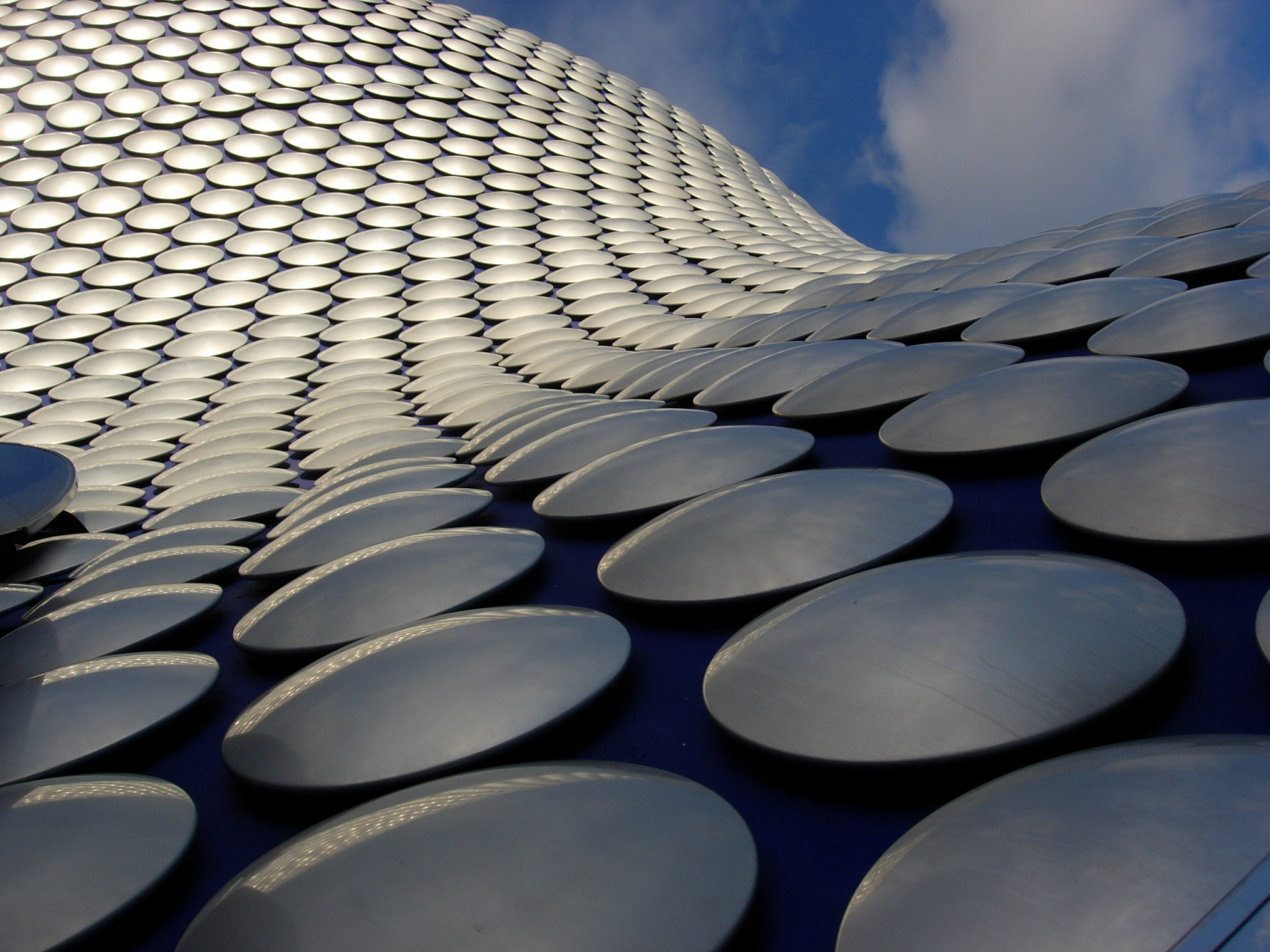
- Exterior detail of the Selfridges Building, Birmingham

Practice information
- Key architects: Jan Kaplický David Nixon; Amanda Levete
- Founded: 1979; 47 years ago
- Location: London, England, UK

Significant works and honors
- Buildings: Lord's Media Centre; Selfridges Building; Bull Ring; Malator; Ferrari Museum, Modena
- Projects: National Library, Prague
- Design: Green Bird, London
- Awards: Stirling Prize (1999)

Future Systems was a London-based architectural and design practice founded in 1979 by Czech architect Jan Kaplický and David Nixon. The practice became known for experimental and futuristic designs that drew on aerospace and automotive engineering as well as forms found in nature. Amanda Levete joined Future Systems as a partner in 1989, after which the practice increasingly moved from experimental projects towards built architecture.

Future Systems gained international recognition with the Lord's Media Centre in London, which won the 1999 Stirling Prize, and the Selfridges Building in Birmingham, completed in 2003. The practice also won the 2007 international competition for a new National Library of the Czech Republic in Prague, although the project was not built.

== Practice ==
Future Systems proposals adapted construction methods from other professions, including (most commonly) the curved monocoque shell structures found in aircraft design, car design and boat building.

In the 1990s the company moved from theoretical projects to fee-paying work with projects such as the "spacecraft-like" Media Centre at Lord's Cricket Ground in London (completed 1999), and the Selfridges Building (completed 2003). For Lord's, Kaplicky received the Stirling Prize. The Selfridges department store is a prime example of the early 21st century movement referred to as "blobitecture", and has been compared to Peter Cook's Kunsthaus in Graz, Austria.

After Future Systems won the Stirling Prize, the firm received larger commissions including the Enzo Ferrari Museum in Modena, Italy (2009) and the unbuilt new Czech National Library. In 2008 Kaplický and Levete split the firm. Kaplický took the firm name and some staff to the Czech Republic, and Levete would take a proposed new headquarters for News Corporation in east London and a commission for a hotel and retail complex in Bangkok, Thailand, along with most of the staff – between 35 and 45 people.

== History ==
Future Systems was founded in London in 1979 by Jan Kaplický and David Nixon. During the 1980s, the practice became known mainly for experimental and largely unbuilt designs influenced by aerospace engineering and industrial technology. Its proposals explored lightweight structures, prefabrication and construction techniques adapted from industries such as aircraft and automobile manufacturing. Amanda Levete, who had previously worked for Richard Rogers, joined Kaplický as a partner in 1989. Their first project together, a proposal for the Bibliothèque de France competition in Paris, received second prize.

The practice increasingly moved from speculative projects to completed buildings during the 1990s. The Hauer-King House in Islington, completed in 1994, was one of its first widely publicised buildings and helped raise its international profile. Future Systems subsequently designed the Lord's Media Centre, whose aluminium semi-monocoque structure was manufactured using techniques associated with boat and aircraft construction. Completed in 1999, the building won that year's Stirling Prize. The practice's next major commission was the Selfridges Building in Birmingham, completed in 2003 as part of the redevelopment of the Bullring.

In 2007, Future Systems won an international competition to design a new National Library of the Czech Republic in Prague, although the project was not built. Kaplický and Levete agreed to divide the practice in 2008, with Kaplický retaining the Future Systems name and Levete establishing her own practice with most of its staff and several ongoing projects. Kaplický died in Prague on 14 January 2009. Future Systems subsequently ceased operating, while several projects originally developed by the practice continued under Amanda Levete Architects and other architects.

== Gallery ==
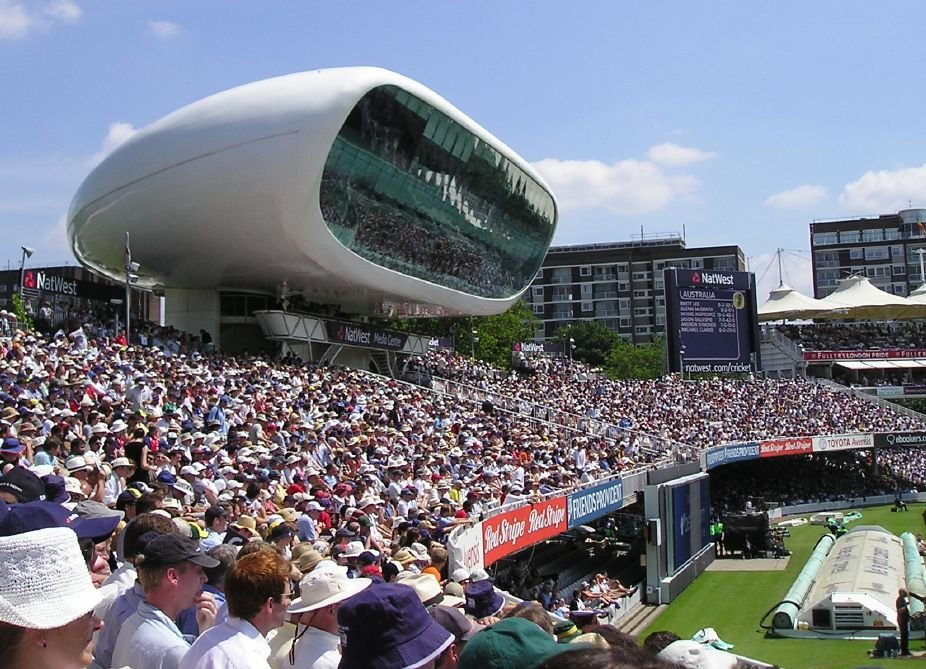
The Media Centre, Lord's Cricket Ground, London

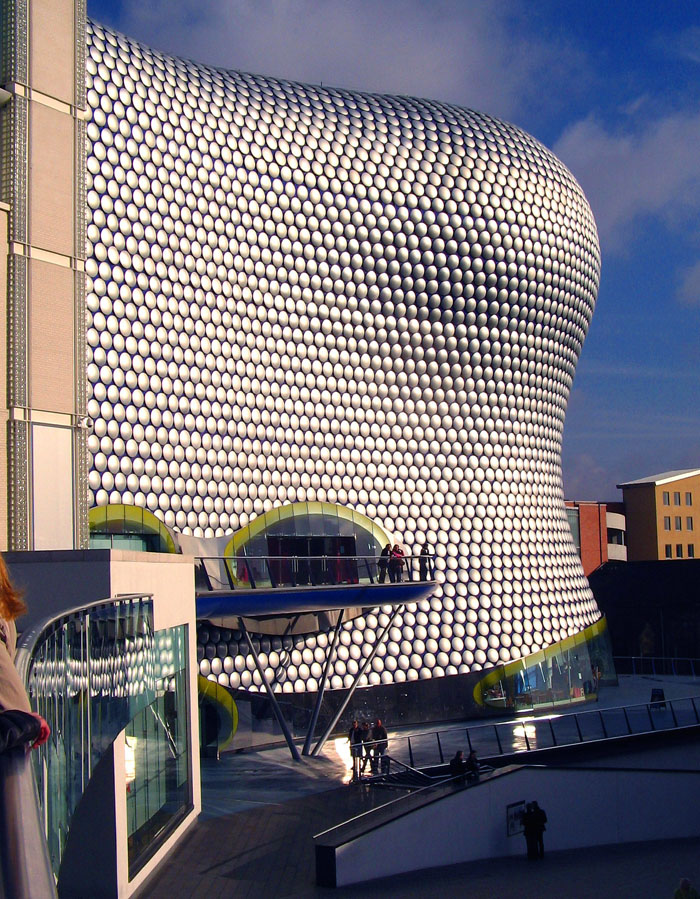
Selfridges Building, the Bull Ring, Birmingham

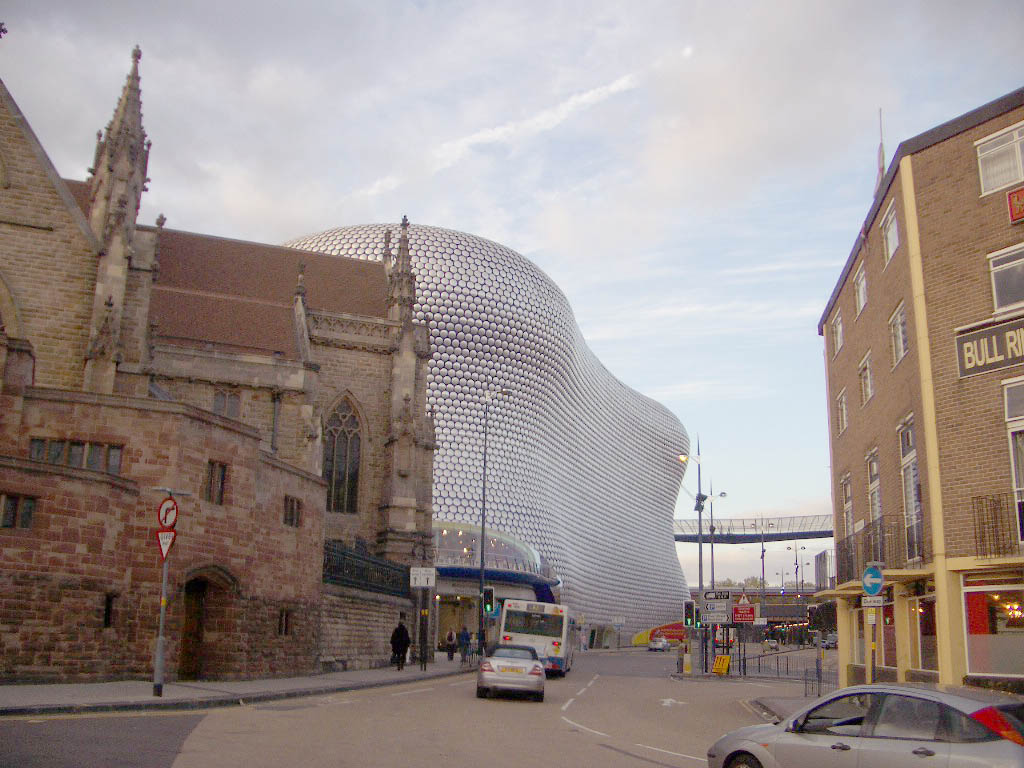
The Selfridges Building from a distance

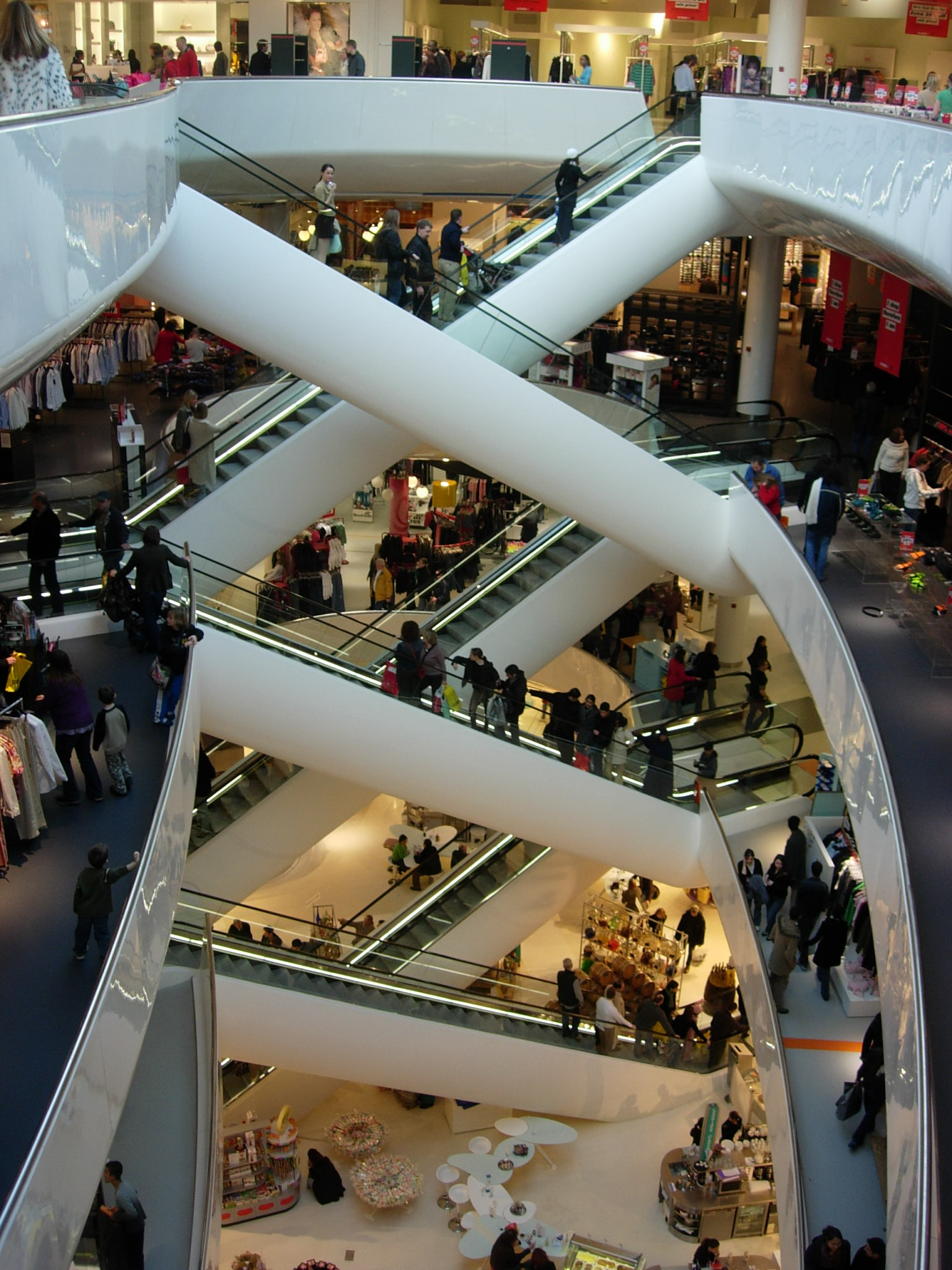
Interior of the Selfridges Building

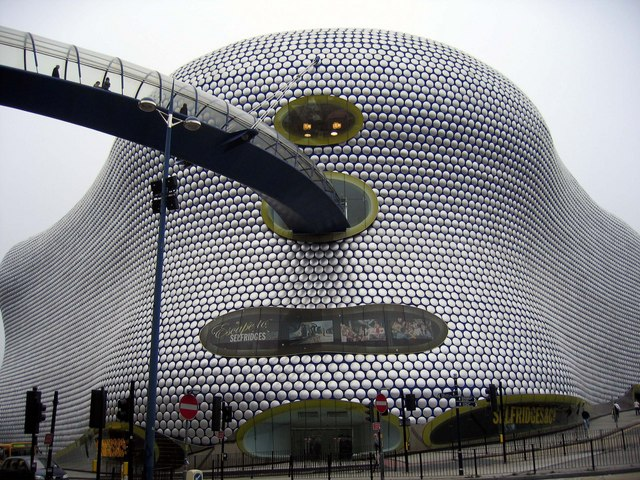
Front view

== Sources ==
- Pawley, Martin (1993). Future Systems : The Story of Tomorrow. London: Phaidon. ISBN 0-7148-2767-3.
- Sudjic, Deyan (2006). Future Systems. London: Phaidon. ISBN 0-7148-4469-1.
