= Top 50 Influential Women in Engineering =

List of the United Kingdom's Top 50 Influential Women in Engineering

In 2016 the Women's Engineering Society (WES), in collaboration with the Daily Telegraph, produced an inaugural list of the United Kingdom's Top 50 Influential Women in Engineering, which was published on National Women in Engineering Day on 23 June 2016. The event was so successful it became an annual celebration. The list was instigated by Dawn Bonfield MBE, then Chief Executive of the Women's Engineering Society. In 2019, WES ended its collaboration with the Daily Telegraph and started a new collaboration with The Guardian newspaper.

Since 2016 a new theme has been used each year to showcase the variety of roles within the engineering industry and champion even more women engineers. The themes have been as follows:

- 2025: Together We Engineer
- 2024: Enhanced by Engineering
- 2023: Safety and Security
- 2022: Inventors and Innovators
- 2021: Engineering Heroes
- 2020: Sustainability
- 2019: Apprentices and Former Apprentices
- 2018: Returners and Transferrers
- 2017: Most Influential Women in Engineering Under 35
- 2016: Most Influential Women in Engineering

== 2016 Winners: Most Influential Women in Engineering ==
The judging panel was chaired by Dawn Bonfield MBE, and included Leon Krill from the Daily Telegraph, Allan Cook CBE, chairman of Atkins, Professor John Perkins, author of the Engineering Skills Survey from the University of Manchester, Fiona Tatton, editor of Womanthology and Michelle Richmond, director of membership and professional development at the Institution of Engineering and Technology.

- Roma Agrawal CEng, MIStructE, MIET, FRICS structural engineer, associate director, AECOM
- Professor Helen Atkinson CBE, FREng head of Department of Engineering, University of Leicester
- Danella Bagnall chief product engineer, Jaguar Land Rover
- Faye Banks FIET, FCMI, FinstLm, CEng, Cmgr head of operations North East, National Grid
- Alison Baptiste CEng, FICE, BEng, MSc, MCIWEM director of strategy and investment, Flood and Coastal Risk Management, Environment Agency
- Jayne Bryant FREng, CEng, FIET, FWES engineering director defence information, BAE Systems
- Muffy Calder OBE, FRSE, FREng vice-principal and head of College of Science and Engineering, University of Glasgow
- Liv Carroll DIC, CGeol, FGS, FIMMM Chartered Geologist, Geological Society
- Jacqueline Castle CEng, FIMechE, FRAeS chief engineer A330neo Wing, Airbus UK
- Amanda Chessell CBE, FREng distinguished engineer, IBM
- Naomi Climer FREng, CEng, FIET president, IET, Institution of Engineering and Technology
- Susan Dio chief executive officer, BP Shipping Limited
- Dr Michèle Dix CBE, CEng, FICE, FCIHT, FCILT managing director, Crossrail 2, Transport for London (TfL)
- Professor Dame Ann Dowling president of the Royal Academy of Engineering, Professor of Mechanical Engineering, Deputy Vice-Chancellor, University of Cambridge
- Elizabeth Eastaugh global head - customer experience, Expedia
- Dawn Elizabeth Elson CEng, FICE, FIMechE, FRAeS, FWES group engineering director, Merlin Entertainments Group
- Jane Gartshore FInstR director, Cool Concerns Ltd
- Professor Lynn Gladden CBE, FRS, FREng Shell Professor of Chemical Engineering, University of Cambridge
- Dr Paulina Bohdanowicz-Godfrey director energy and environment, Hilton Worldwide
- Dame Judith Hackitt CBE, FREng chair, EEF
- Professor Dame Wendy Hall DBE, FRS, FREng director, Web Science Institute, University of Southampton
- Eur Ing Louise Hardy CEng, FICE, CMgr, FCMI, FWES non-executive director, Sirius Minerals Plc
- Professor Caroline Hargrove CEng, FIMechE technical director, McLaren Applied Technologies
- Professor Karen Holford FREng, FWES, FLSW, CEng, FIMechE pro vice-chancellor, Cardiff University
- Ying Hu manufacturing systems engineer, Rolls-Royce Plc
- Dame Sue Ion FREng, FRS chair NIRAB, Nuclear Innovation and Research Advisory Board
- Lady Barbara Judge CBE chairman emeritus, UK Atomic Energy Authority
- Julia King, Baroness Brown of Cambridge DBE, FREng vice-chancellor and chief executive, Aston University
- Ailie MacAdam FICE, MIChemE managing director, Europe and Africa, Infrastructure, Bechtel
- Dr Cathy McClay head of commercial, electricity, National Grid
- Steph McGovern presenter, BBC Breakfast
- Linda Miller PEng (US) senior project manager, Bechtel
- Dervilla Mitchell CBE director, Arup
- Heidi Mottram OBE chief executive officer, Northumbrian Water Group
- Alison Nimmo CBE chief executive, The Crown Estate
- Belinda Oldfield FICE, AMIoW general manager, Scottish Water
- Chi Onwurah MP, CEng, FIET, FCGI MP, UK Government
- Isobel Pollock-Hulf OBE, CEng, Hon DSc, FIMechE, FCGI Master, Worshipful Company of Engineers
- Dr Haifa Ross head of School of Engineering, Solihull College and University Centre
- Helen Samuels United Utilities
- Dr Angela Seeney FEI, CEng, CEng, CPet Eng director technology, supply chain and decommissioning, Oil & Gas Authority
- Dr Nina Skorupska CBE, FEI chief executive, Renewable Energy Association
- Jane Simpson chief engineer, Network Rail
- Dana Skelley OBE director of asset management, Transport for London
- Rachel Skinner CEng, FICE, TPP, MCIHT director of development, WSP Parsons Brinckerhoff
- Dr Debbie Smith OBE, FIFE, CPhys, MInstP managing director, BRE Global
- Vicky Stewart MIOA, MWED associate acoustic consultant, Atkins
- Eleanor Stride professor of engineering science, University of Oxford
- Dr Alison Vincent chief technology officer, Cisco International Ltd
- Katherine Ward CEng, MICE group head, offshore wind, Atkins

== 2017 Winners (Theme: Most Influential Women in Engineering Under 35) ==
The judging panel included Dr Pete Thompson, CEO, NPL, Gillian Arnold, director, Tectre, Clare Lavelle, associate director, Arup, John McCollum, head of Engineering, BAE, Benita Mehra, WES President, Kirsten Bodley, WES CEO, Isobel Pollock-Hulf, WES Patron.

- Kimberley Abbott, Customer Innovation & Strategic Growth Developer, Thales UK
- Dr Nadia Abdul-Karim, lecturer, Cranfield Forensics Institute, Cranfield University
- Lucy Ackland, Senior Development Engineer, Renishaw plc
- Pavlina Akritas, Associate, Arup
- Maela Baker, Civil Engineer, Pick Everard
- Camilla Barrow, Deputy Project Manager, Bechtel Ltd
- Chloe Branston, Advanced Apprentice (CAD Designer), Cavendish Nuclear
- Victoria Brown, Maintenance Apprentice Coordinator, EDF Energy
- Kerrine Bryan, Chartered Electrical Engineer / Author, Butterfly Books Limited
- Abi Bush, Technical Advisor, Field Ready
- Angela Carr, Mechanical Engineer, EDF Energy
- Kim Cave-Ayland, Control Engineer, UK Atomic Energy Authority
- Helena Conceicao, Senior Project Manager, Carillion
- Sophie Dent, Systems Engineer Graduate, BAE Systems - Submarines
- Priyanka Dhopade, senior research associate, Department of Engineering Science, University of Oxford
- Frances Dixon, Construction Manager, Colas Ltd.
- Louise Ellis, Senior Engineer, Ove Arup and Partners Ltd
- Ozak Esu, Electrical Engineer, Cundall
- Lidia Galdino, research associate, University College London
- Claire Gott, Design Manager and UK Head of Corporate Social Responsibility, WSP
- Louise Hall, Commercial Services Manager, Environment Agency
- Nikita Hari, Doctoral Scholar & Social Tech Entrepreneur, University of Cambridge
- Sophie Harker, Aerodynamics and Performance Engineer, BAE Systems
- Gemma Holmes, Site Manager, JN Bentley Ltd
- Jodie Howlett, Product Definition Engineer (Year in Industry Student), Rolls-Royce
- Abbie Hutty, Lead Spacecraft Structures Engineer, ExoMars Rover, Airbus
- Nada Issa, Intermediate Mechanical Engineer, ChapmanBDSP
- Jessica Leigh Jones, Engineer, Sony
- Lynsey Lennon, Performance Team Leader, Scottish Water
- Nan Li, Lecturer, Imperial College London
- Eva Linnell, Senior Engineer, Atkins
- Susan McDonald, Senior Consultant in Infrastructure & Capital Projects, Deloitte
- Orla Murphy, Forward Model Quality Engineer, Jaguar Land Rover
- Áine Ní Bhreasail, Geotechnical Engineer, Arup
- Kimberley Norris, Systems Engineer, Leonardo MW Ltd
- Hiteshree (Tesh) Patel, Software Manager, Dyson
- Victoria Richardson, Structural / Bridge Engineer, Arup
- Victoria Roots, Senior Systems Engineer, BAE Systems
- Sharon Ross, Senior Cluster Engineer, Mars Petcare
- Marie Sebban-Lee, Associate (Environmental), ChapmanBDSP
- Lauren Shea, Arkwright Scholar/TeenTech Ambassador/A-level Student, Alton Convent School
- Lara Small, Manufacturing Engineering Manager, Rolls-Royce & British Army Royal Engineers
- Jennifer Stables, Senior Engineer, AECOM
- Lorna Tasker, Head of Rehabilitation Engineering, Morriston Hospital, Swansea
- Samantha Thompson, Project Engineer, Dooson Babcock
- Katy Toms, Infrastructure Engineer, AECOM
- Elizabeth Waterman, Senior Engineer, PDL Solutions (Europe) Limited
- Simone Weber, Technical Project Manager at Airbus Helicopters UK and researcher at Cranfield University
- Dr Catrin Ffion Williams, Ser Cymru Research Fellow, Cardiff University School of Engineering (High Frequency)
- Amy Wright, Senior Site Engineer, Farrans

== 2018 Winners (Theme: Returners and Transferrers) ==
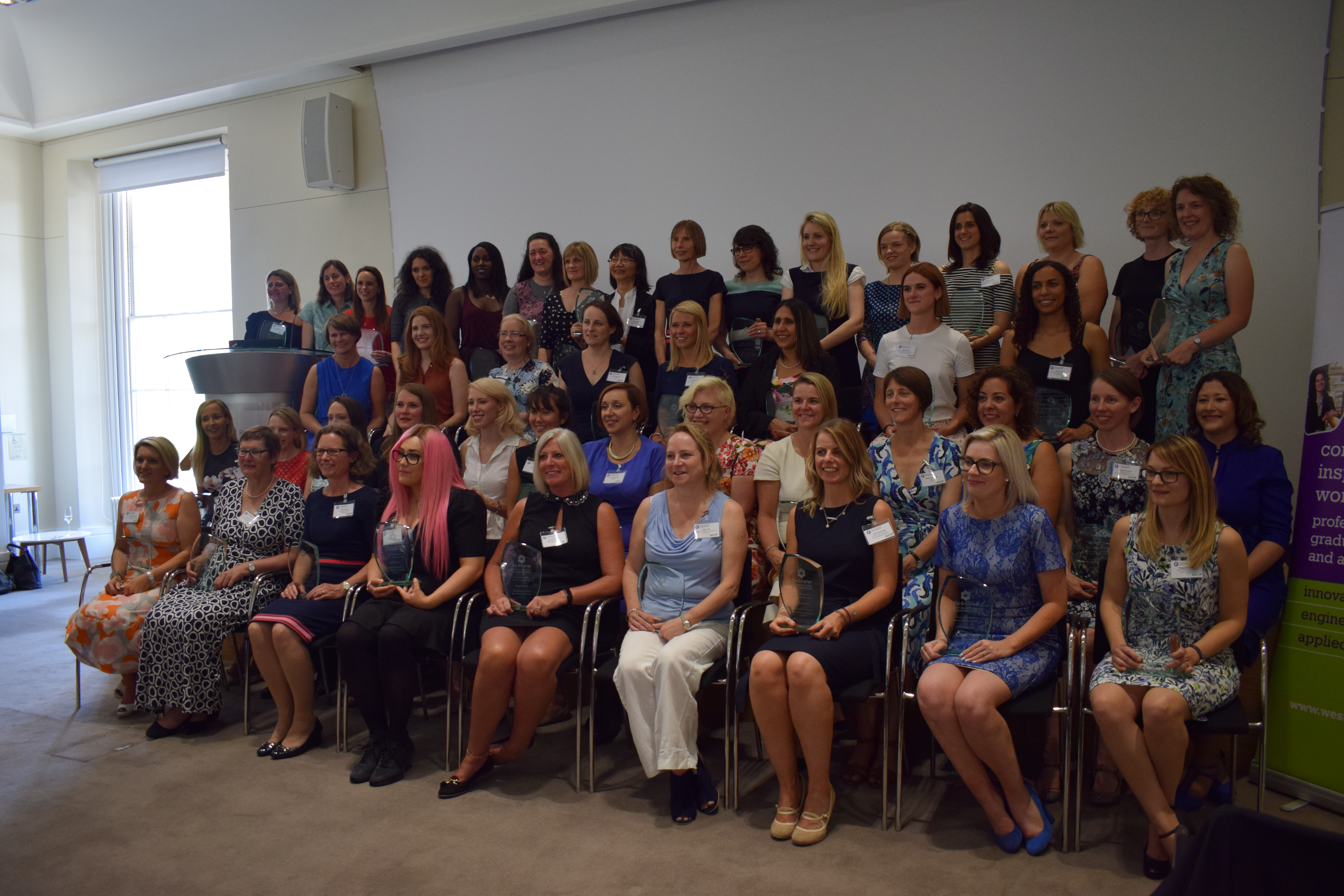
A celebration of the 2018 Top 50 Women in Engineering at the Royal Academy of Engineering

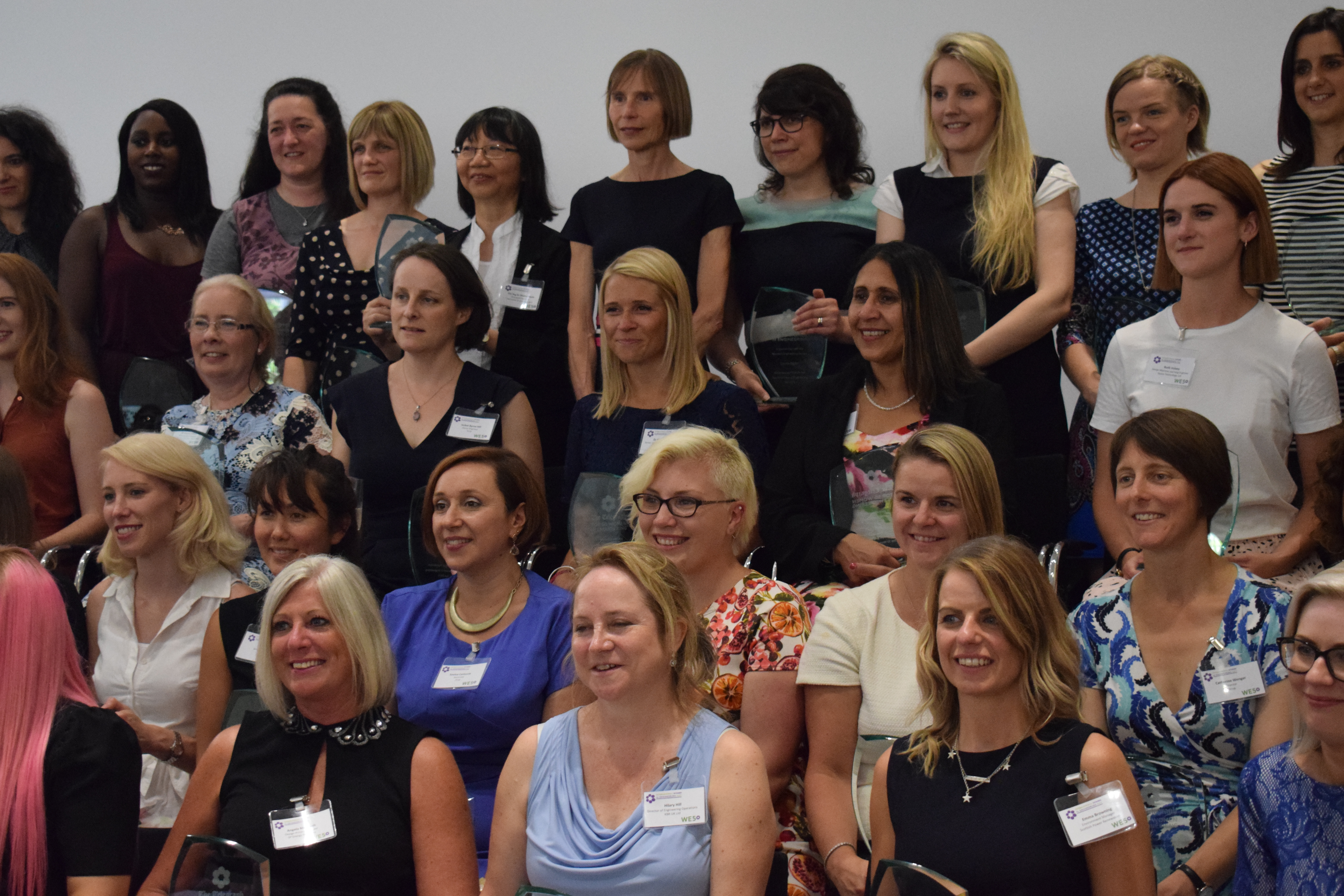
Close up of Top 50 Women in Engineering award winners

- Katie Atkinson, Materials Engineer, Jaguar Land Rover
- Kate Black, University Lecturer, University of Liverpool
- Cheryl Blenkinsop, Lead Engineer – Development, SP Energy Networks
- Emma Booth, Senior Project Manager, Black & Veatch
- Karen Britton, Technical Director, AECOM
- Emma Browning, Environment Manager, Scottish Power Renewables
- Antje Budge, Design Coordinator, Balfour Beatty
- Samantha Burchell, Operations Manager, UK Power Networks
- Isobel Byrne Hill, Senior Engineer, Arup
- Kate Cairns, Founder, Cairns Consultancy
- Savina Carluccio, Associate, Arup
- Dr Fiona Charnley, senior lecturer in Circular Innovation, Cranfield University
- Dr Sarah Chen, Civil Engineer, EDF Energy
- Dr Lorna Dallas, Graduate Safety Engineer, Babcock International Group
- Rachael De'Ath, Senior Engineer, Arup/Senior Teaching Associate, University of Bristol
- Kellie Dillon, Innovation Workstream Lead, UK Power Networks
- Agata Downey, Engineer, Elliott Wood
- Karen Friendship, Managing Director, Alderman Tooling Ltd
- Penny Gowler, Associate Director, Elliott Wood Partnership Ltd
- Nicola Grahamslaw, Ship's Conservation Engineer, SS Great Britain Trust
- Hilary Hill, Director of Engineering Operations, KBR UK Ltd
- Dr Isobel Houghton, Senior Engineer, Atkins
- Sharon Jones, Eagle Lab Engineer, Barclays Eagle Labs
- Katie Kelleher, Crane Operator, Laing O'Rourke
- Louisa King, Project Engineer, Waterco Consultants
- Keely King, Area Manager—Gas Mains Replacement, Triio
- Georgina Lockwood, Senior Engineer, Arup
- Leah Lucien, Graduate Mechanical Engineer, ChapmanBDSP
- Professor Eur Ing Dr Phebe Mann , Chartered Engineer, Institution of Civil Engineers
- Stacey Marple, Project Development Manager, Monitor Coatings Ltd
- Lisa Matthews, Associate, Arup/CEO, HellyHolly
- Louise Maynard-Atem, Innovation Exchange Lead, BAE Systems
- Danielle McGrellis, Senior Engineer, Arup
- Angela McIntosh, Design Project Engineer, SP Energy Networks
- Carol Morris, Senior Lecturer-Engineering & Innovation, Open University
- Lisa Montague, Business Intelligence Engineer, BAE Systems
- Fi Neoh, Senior Consultant, Amey
- Hayley Oakes, Offshore Project Engineer, ODE
- Maria Ribera Vincent, teaching fellow, Imperial College London
- Nicole Saunders, Aviation Consultant, Osprey Consulting Services Ltd
- Professor Emma Sparks, Head of the Centre for Systems Engineering, Cranfield University
- Sarah Tattersall, associate, Arup
- Dr Emma Taylor, Lead Systems Safety Engineer, RSSB
- Julie Verrill, Junior Technician, Cundall
- Ruth Voisey, Senior Machine Learning Engineer, Dyson Technology Ltd
- Catherine Wenger, Director, Arup
- Tammy Whelan, Apprentice Civil Engineer, Arup
- Dr Connie Wilson, Senior Systems Engineer, BAE Systems Maritime – Naval Ships
- Kate Young, Senior Mechanical Engineer, Skanska
- Ellie Zemani, Project Engineer, Spirit Energy

== 2019 Winners (Theme: Current and Former Apprentices) ==
The event was held at the Royal Academy of Engineering in 2019 and the Women's Engineering Society moved to collaborate with the Guardian newspaper, who published a supplement containing details of the winners on the 24 June 2019 to celebrate International Women in Engineering Day 2020. The date also marked 100 years since the formation of the Society. The judging panel consisted of Head Judge Dawn Fitt OBE, Bedford College, Dawn Childs, President, Women's Engineering Society, Julie Dakin, Mott Macdonald, Elizabeth Donnelly, CEO, Women's Engineering Society, John McCollum, BAE Systems, Alex Walker, Ford, and Will Whittow, the WES Men As Allies winner 2017, and senior lecturer at Loughborough University.

- Katrina-Rose Allen, Apprentice Engineer, Govia Thameslink Railway (GTR) Ltd
- Natalie Asimeng-Gyan, Engineering Apprentice, GSK
- Natalie Atherton, Zone Operations Manager, Sodexo
- Abbie Beaver, Apprentice Fabricator/Welder, ADI Group
- Jacinta Caden, Business Development (Europe), Critical Project Services
- Sophie Caffrey, Technical Apprentice, Leonardo
- Emily Carr, Apprentice Electrical/Instrumentation Technician, GSK
- Rachael Carr, Senior Systems Engineer, BAE Systems
- Nicole Chamberlain, Automation and MES Engineer, Nestlé
- Melissa Chigubu, Apprentice, Manufacturing Technology Centre (MTC), subsequently employed by GKN Automotive Innovation Centre
- Heather Clarke, Trustee, Institution of Mechanical Engineers (IMechE)
- Lisa-Jayne Cook, Senior Sales and Applications Engineer, Aqua Temperature Control Solutions
- Dr Katherine Critchley, Configuration Management Bpm, Safran Seats
- Alexandra Ellis-Jones, Junior Engineer, GSK
- Jasmine Ewers, Undergraduate Engineer, WSP
- Danielle Flynn, Degree Apprentice, Jaguar Land Rover
- Angela George, Mechanical Design Engineer, Diamond Light Source Ltd
- Natalie Goodman, Permit To Work Coordinator, Spirit Energy
- Bethany Holroyd, Project Coordinator, WSP
- Kelly Jeffery, Civil Engineer, Jacobs
- Grace Johnstone, Principal Engineer, BAE Systems
- Charlotte Jones, Technician, Aecom
- Sharon Lane, Managing Director, Tees Components
- Catherine Leahy, Apprentice Corrosion Technician, TWI
- Chloe Le Grand, Senior Design Engineer, MBDA UK
- Catherine Llewellyn-Jones, Undergraduate Aerospace Engineering Apprentice, Airbus
- Sylvia Lu, 5G Tech Lead, U-Blox UK
- Paula McMahon, Chartered Civil Engineer, Sir Robert McAlpine
- Judith Mair, Manufacturing Laboratory Technologist, Rolls-Royce Plc
- Jenny Manning, Additive Manufacturing Engineering Lead, BAE Systems
- Raisa Matadar, Technical Support Apprentice, Jaguar Land Rover
- Kirsty McDermott, Design Assurance Engineer, National Grid
- Eden McGlen, Apprentice Engineering Maintenance Technician, Unipres
- Lauren McNaughton, Apprentice Building Services Engineer, Arup
- Lois Medley, Electrical Apprentice, WSP
- Sarah Mulvanny, BIM Technician, Arup
- Lesley Nutter, Senior Engineer, Engineering Apprenticeships, BAE Systems
- Emma Roberts, Applications Engineer, Fairfield Control Systems
- Billie Sequeira, Technical Apprentice, BAE Systems
- Jenny Smith, Principal Engineer, MBDA (UK)
- Sophie Smith, Building Surveyor, Atkins
- Sarah Speir, Project Engineer, SP Energy Networks
- Courteney Stone, Engineering Technician Apprentice, BMW Group Manufacturing
- Laurie-Ann Sutherland Smith, Reliability Engineer, Musk Process Services
- Charlotte Tingley, Quality Engineer, BAE Systems
- Tammy Whelan, Assistant Technician, Arup
- Jade White, Welding Engineer, Sellafield
- Perdi Williams, assistant research scientist, National Physical Laboratory
- Ambar Yasin, Apprentice, Jaguar Land Rover
- Daniela Zanni, Structural Technician Apprentice, Arup

== 2020 Winners (Theme: Sustainability) ==
In 2020 the Women's Engineering Society moved away from what women engineers are to what women engineers do and called for nominations for the Top 50 Women in Sustainability. The winners were announced during a live webinar on the 23 June 2020 to celebrate International Women in Engineering Day. The judging panel consisted of Head Judge Sally Sudworth, Environment Agency, Ann-Christin Andersen, Rotork Board Member, Richard Coackley, Past President & Sustainability Leader, Institution of Civil Engineers, Andrew Conway, director of Engineering, BAI Communications, Elizabeth Donnelly, CEO, Women's Engineering Society, Louise Kingham, CEO Institute of Energy, Davide Stronati, Global Sustainability Leader, Mott Macdonald, and Joanna Wood, Group Engineering Director, BAE Systems.

- Yasmin Ali, energy innovation project manager, UK Government, Department of Business, Energy and Industrial Strategy
- Laura Bishop, director, Infinitas Design
- Laura Brown, Energy Research Programme Manager, Newcastle University
- Adele Carey, Senior Sustainability Engineer, Arup
- Ellie Cosgrave, Lecturer In Urban Innovation And Policy, UCL
- Carla Denyer, Councillor, Bristol City Council
- Pamela Dugdale, Engineering Teacher, International Study Centre Liverpool John Moores University
- Rhiannon Evans, Technician, Aecom
- Laura Frost, associate, Cities & Climate Change, Arup
- Ritu Garg, Senior Transport Engineer, Arup
- Barnali Ghosh, Technical Director, Mott Macdonald
- Rachel Gomes, associate professor, Chemical And Environmental Engineering, University of Nottingham
- Deborah Greaves, Head Of School Of Engineering, Computing And Mathematics, University of Plymouth
- Sandy Halliday, director, Gaia Group
- Caireen Hargreaves, Associate Director Product Sustainability, AstraZeneca
- Kelly Harrison, associate, Heyne Tillett Steel
- Martha Hart, Senior Consultant, Arup
- Laura Hepburn, director, Greenology
- Katherine Ibbotson, Programme Carbon And Cost Manager, Environment Agency
- Michelle Johnson, Technical Director, Wood Environment and Infrastructure UK
- Jennifer Kelly, associate, Arup
- Eftychia Koursari, Civil Engineer, Amey
- Clare Lavelle, Energy Consulting Leader - Scotland, Arup
- Claire Lucas, associate professor (Reader), University of Warwick
- Xuanli Luo, research associate, The University of Nottingham
- Brogan MacDonald, Structural Engineer, Ramboll
- Mercedes Maroto-Valer, Champion UK Industrial Decarbonisation Research and Innovation Centre, Heriot-Watt University
- Kerry Mashford, Non-Executive Director, Portfolio
- Senamiso Mathobela, Delivery Manager (TNCC), National Grid UK
- Mhairi McCann, Founder & CEO, Youth STEM 2030
- Gill Nowell, DSO Lead, Electralink
- Rachel Oliver, professor, director of the Cambridge Centre for Gallium Nitride, CSO of Poro Technology, University of Cambridge
- Jo Parker, director, Watershed Associates
- Sally Povolotsky, Low Carbon Business Development Consultant, Straight 6 Design
- Philippa Ross, associate director, Atkins
- Anusha Shah, Director - Resilient Cities, Arcadis
- Sandra Šlihte, Head Of Engineering, Vattenfall Heat UK
- Holly Smith, Civil Engineer, Skanska UK
- Chitra Srinivasan, Real Time Control Software Engineer, UK Atomic Energy Authority
- Annie Stapley, Assistant Engineer, WSP
- Alisa Stratulat, Innovation Manager, Groupe Atlantic
- Judith Sykes, senior director, Expedition Engineering
- Petra Szilágyi, lecturer in Functional Materials, Queen Mary University of London
- Elizabeth Tennyson, Marie Skłodowska-Curie Actions fellow, University of Cambridge
- Camilla Thomson, Chancellor's Fellow In Energy, The University of Edinburgh
- Mi Tian, lecturer, University of Exeter
- Valeska Ting, Professor of Smart Nanomaterials, University of Bristol
- Kusum Trikha, Senior Engineer, WSP
- Jana Marie Weber, PhD candidate, University of Cambridge
- Laura Williams, Health, Safety, Environment and Quality Advisor, Keller

== 2021 Winners (Theme: Engineering Heroes) ==
In 2021 the Women's Engineering Society selected the theme of Engineering Heroes to celebrate the women engineers around the world who played a major role in protecting and defending society from the COVID-19 pandemic. Believing the pandemic to be over by the time of the awards, WES also chose to celebrate women engineers who deliver and maintain critical services and infrastructure, keep civic society functioning at every level, and support lives and livelihoods. The winners were announced on The Guardian and Women's Engineering Society's websites on the 23 June 2021 to celebrate International Women in Engineering Day. A virtual awards ceremony celebrated each winner during a live webinar on the same day.

The judging panel consisted of Head Judge, Professor Catherine Noakes, Simon Barber, UK Managing Director, Assytem WE50 Sponsor, Dawn Childs FREng, UK Change Director, National Grid, Emma Crichton, head of Engineering, Engineers without Borders, Scott Dalrymple, Vice-president HR, Crane, Elizabeth Donnelly, chief executive officer, Women's Engineering Society, Neil Gibbs, ABB, Frankie Laugier-Davies, Senior Account Manager, Pareto Facilities Management Ltd, Mark McBride Wright, Equal Engineers, Sarah Mogford, Environment and Planning Divisional Director, RSK, Emma Nicholson, Development Project Manager, SLC Rail, Steff Smith MWES, chief executive officer, Institute of Measurement and Control, and Mara Tafadzwa Makoni, Association for Black Engineers (AFBE).

- Dr habil Tayebeh Ameri, senior lecturer, University of Edinburgh, School of Engineering
- Samidha Anand, Engineering Manager, Caterpillar UK (Perkins Engines Co Ltd)
- Phoebe Baker, Construction Manager, Mace
- Dr Claire Bennett, Senior Geotechnical Engineer, Arup
- Dr Grace Campbell, Senior Natural Hazard and Risk Specialist, Arup
- Jackie Carpenter, director, Friendship Cohousings
- Dame Jo da Silva, Global Sustainable Development Leader, Arup
- Georgia Davey, Senior Buyer, Babcock International Group
- WO2 Claire Dewhirst, Aircraft Engineer, 1 Regiment AAC Workshop REME (Ministry of Defence)
- Dr Karen Donaldson, research associate, University of Edinburgh
- Professor Hua Dong, professor in Design, Dean of Brunel Design School, Brunel University London
- Dr Katherine Dunn, lecturer, The University of Edinburgh
- Dr Natalia Falagán, lecturer in Food Science and Technology, Cranfield University
- Professor Elena Gaura, Professor of Pervasive Computing, Coventry University
- Kate Grant, director of Network West Midlands, Cadent Gas Limited
- Katherine Grigg, HS2 Main Works Agent, SCS Railways Joint Venture (HS2 Main Works)
- Jo Hartnell, Assistant Tunnelling Engineer, Atkins
- Milly Hennayake, Civil Water Engineer, Arup
- Jean Hewitt, Senior Inclusive Design Consultant, Buro Happold
- Debbie Janson, senior lecturer, University of Bath
- Dr Sohini Kar-Narayan, reader (Associate Professor) in Device & Energy Materials, University of Cambridge
- Emma Kent, Director - Construction, Metropolitan Police
- Dr Suk Kinch, senior design and development engineer, Renishaw Neuro Solutions
- Hanna Leeson, Senior Environmental Engineer, BAE SYSTEMS
- Dr Kristen MacAskill, lecturer, University of Cambridge
- Caitlin McCall, Engineering Doctorate Student, Swansea University and icmPrint
- Linda McVittie, Sales Manager, Scotland, J & E Hall Limited
- Dr Helen Meese, Founder & CEO, The Care Machine Ltd
- Susana Neves e Brooks, Lead Project Manager, National Grid
- Mimi Nwosu, Assistant Materials Engineer, Sir Robert McAlpine
- Jennifer Olsen, PhD researcher, Newcastle University
- Polly Osborne, Assistant Electrical Engineer, Burns & McDonnell
- Dr Cristiana Pace, Founder, E-novation
- Dr Tannaz Pak, senior lecturer in Energy and Environmental Engineering, Teesside University
- Sergeant Sarah Partington, Senior Medical and Dental Technician, Army Medical Services Training Centre
- Kelly Paul, Core Projects Team Lead - UKI, Air Products PLC
- Kayisha Payne, Founder & Programme Director, BBSTEM (Black British Professionals in Science, Technology, Engineering and Maths) Ltd
- Andrea Pearson, Senior Engineer – Operations, Sabic UK Petrochemicals
- Professor Alison Raby, Professor of Environmental Fluid Mechanics, University of Plymouth
- Catherine Rennie, Consultant ENT surgeon, Charing Cross Hospital
- Professor Jane Rickson, Professor of Soil Erosion and Conservation, Cranfield University
- Dr Dipa Roy, senior lecturer, The University of Edinburgh
- Jyoti Sehdev, Group EDI lead, Costain
- Era Shah, Senior Engineer - HS2 Enabling Works, Costain Skanska Joint Venture (HS2 Enabling Works)
- Professor Rebecca Shipley, Professor of Healthcare Engineering, UCL
- Dr Maria Sunyer Pinya, Senior Climate Change Consultant, Arup
- Dr Larissa Suzuki, Data/AI Practice Lead, Google
- Sue Threader, Bridge Clerk (Chief Executive), Rochester Bridge Trust
- Hannah Vickers, Chief Executive, Association for Consultancy and Engineering
- Julie Wood, director, Arup

== 2022 Winners (Theme: Inventors and Innovators) ==
In 2022 the Women's Engineering Society selected the theme of Inventors and Innovators to celebrate the women engineers who demonstrated the creation or improvement of a product or process that makes a difference. The winners were announced on The Guardian and Women's Engineering Society's websites on the 23 June 2022 to celebrate International Women in Engineering Day. The awards were planned to be given at a ceremony at the Institution of Civil Engineers on the same day, but a rail strike on the same day, resulted in its postponement.

- Hannah Abend, chief operating officer, Wood Thilsted
- Dr Tosin Adedipe-Elusakin, Technical Project Coordinator, Cranfield University
- Ruth Amos, Inventor, Stairsteady/ Kids Invent Stuff
- Mercedes Ascaso Til, Principal Engineer, DLT Engineering Ltd. (formerly Dorman Long Technology)
- Eleanor Ball, co-founder and director, Graphic Structures
- Hani Baluch, Solutions Delivery Manager, bp
- Divya Bhanderi, Senior Engineer, Arup
- Dr Qianyu Chen, research fellow, University of Birmingham
- Jessica Coldrey, Digital Skills Mentor, Birmingham Open Media
- Evelyn Cropper, Technical Manager, Stirling Dynamics
- Philippa Davies, Engineering Director, Reaction Engines Limited
- Beth Dickens, director, Quoceant Ltd
- Dr Ama Frimpong, head of Product Development, 52 North Health
- Dr Jennifer Glover, Graduate Acoustic Consultant, AECOM
- Bethany Hall, Electrical Engineer Aerospace, Rolls-Royce/Aerospace Technology Institute
- Dr Yiheng Hu, PhD researcher, University of Huddersfield
- Rowena Innocent, Group Head of STEM strategy, Spectris plc
- Tina Irvine, Engineer, Arup
- Dr Ornella Iuorio, Associate Prof., University of Leeds
- Prof Caroline Jay, head of Research, School of Engineering, University of Manchester
- Alice Kan, Pharmaceutical Director, Kan Do Ventures
- Prof Eiman Kanjo, professor and head of Smart Sensing Lab, Nottingham Trent University
- Natalie Kerres, CEO, founder, NK Technology Ltd. (SCALED)
- Palvisha Khan, EMEA Strategy and Transformation Lead, Reliance Worldwide Corporation
- Dr Alalea Kia, research fellow, Imperial College London
- Lucie Killen, Structural Engineer, Price & Myers
- Guneet Kohli, Engineer, Arup
- Marisa Kurimbokus, Mechanical Engineering Team Leader, Aeristech Ltd
- Sarah Lu, PhD Researcher, University of Southampton
- Noor Mansur, Senior Electronics Engineer, Dyson Technology Ltd.
- Prof Serena Margadonna, head of the School of Engineering and Applied Sciences, Swansea University
- Prof Gabriela Medero, professor in Geotechnical and Geoenvironmental Engineering, Heriot-Watt University
- Dr Nausheen Sultana Mehboob Basha, Project Manager and researcher, Imperial College London
- Prof Aline Miller, professor and Associate Dead, University of Manchester
- Sophie V Morse, research fellow, Imperial College London
- Dr Youmna Mouhamad, Royal Academy Enterprise Fellow 2020, Myana Naturals Ltd
- Dr Priti Parikh, associate professor, Bartlett School of Sustainable Construction, head of Engineering for International Development Centre
- Krystina Pearson-Rampeearee, Senior Flight System Engineer, BAE Systems
- Rachel Pether, director of Water Utilities, Consultancy, Binnies UK
- Dr Agnieszka Rutkowska, Electrochemistry Lead, Depixus
- Prof Lidija Šiller, Professor of Nanoscale Science, Newcastle University
- Radhika Srinivasan, CEO & Founder, EcoTextura
- Swati, director, Anant Biomedical Limited
- Sarah Teliani, Project Manager, Arup
- Dr Navya Thomas, research fellow in Membrane Crystallisation, Cranfield University
- Georgia Thompson, Assistant Design Programme Manager, BAM Nuttall
- Carolina Toczycka, co-founder and Chief Commercial Officer, Lenz Labs
- Georgina Wharton, director of Technology, Parkside Community School
- Jane Wright, Emerging Leaders Scheme (Decarbonisation Strategy and Engineering), Transport for London (TfL)
- Nadja Yang, President, European Young Engineers

The judging panel consisted of the following:

- Dr Bola Olabisi – Founder & CEO of the Global Women Inventors & Innovators Network (GlobalWIIN) (Head Judge)
- Lauren Touré – Diversity & Inclusion Manager, Ball Beverage Packaging EMEA (WE50 Sponsor)
- Dawn Childs FREng – CEO, Pure Data Centres (Operations), and President, Women's Engineering Society
- Carl Hayward – Business Excellence Manager, Costa Coffee Express
- Dr Giorgia Longobardi – CEO, Cambridge GaN Devices
- Mara Makoni – Consultant, PA Consulting & Board Member, Association For Black Engineers
- Dr Mark McBride-Wright CEng MIChemE – Founder and Managing Director, Equal Engineers
- Libby Meyrick – Chief Executive, Institution of Engineering Designers
- Susan Robson – Principal Consultant, National Grid & Board Member, Women's Engineering Society
- Emily Spearman – Head of PMO, Orsted & Board Member, Women's Engineering Society

== 2023 Winners (Theme: Safety and Security) ==
In 2023 the Women's Engineering Society selected the theme of Safety and Security to celebrate the women engineers whose often unseen contributions make everyone safer. The winners were announced on The Guardian and Women's Engineering Society's websites on the 23 June 2023 to celebrate International Women in Engineering Day. The awards were planned to be given at a ceremony at the Institution of Civil Engineers on the same day, but a rail strike on the same day, resulted in its postponement.

- Chisom Akujobi-Ezeonyeka, Power Electronics and Systems Engineer, Rootwave Ltd
- Mary Allan, Principal Radiation Protection Scientist and Head of Profession, Atomic Weapons Establishment (AWE)
- Sarah Bailey. Hardware Engineer, Leonardo
- Niamh Barker, Graduate Engineer, Arup
- Dr Beth Barnes, Assistant Professor in Engineering, Durham University
- Sholeh Behzadpour-Shaw, Senior Engineer Industrial Cyber, Heathrow Airport Ltd.
- Dr Marzia Bolpagni, Associate Director – Head of BIM International, Mace
- Sue Caccavone, Operations Manager – Asset Management, Binnies (UK) Ltd.
- Caroline GCHQ
- Patrizia Carpentieri, Principal Blast Engineer, Arup
- Kelly Cary, Managing Consultant – Transport Planning, Atkins
- Dr Clara Cheung, Senior Lecturer in Mechanical, Aerospace and Civil Engineering, University of Manchester
- Sarah Clark, Head of Technology Centre, Atomic Weapons Establishment (AWE)
- Natasha Dunkinson, Aerospace Engineering Degree Apprentice, BAE Systems
- Jennifer Edwards, Senior Systems Engineer, UK Space Agency
- Verena Fernandes, Senior Civil Engineer, Wokingham Borough Council
- Dr Nicolette Formosa, Senior Research Engineer in Technology, National Highways
- Mariella Gallo, Associate Director Arup Resilience Security and Risk, Arup
- Charlotte Goodwill, CEO, Institute of Telecommunications Professionals
- Ana Gorgyan, Director of Engineering, Independent Power Corporation PLC
- Sally Hall, Senior Engineer, Frazer-Nash Consultancy
- Dr Amina Hamoud, Lecturer in Systems Engineering, University of West of England
- Laura Hoang, Senior Human Factors Engineering Consultant, Environmental Resources Management Ltd
- Lauren Jenkins, Engineering Capacity Lead, Defence Equipment and Support
- Svetlana Joao, Structural Engineer and ICE President Future Leader, Institution of Civil Engineers
- Emma Johnsén, Personal Care R&E Director, Europe, Middle East & Africa, Kimberly-Clark
- Laura Joryeff, Principal (Engineering Safety) Consultant, Corporate Risk Associates (CRA)
- Eleni Kastrisiou, Engineer, Arup
- Susan Khan, Head of Hardware Engineering, Thales Ground Transportation Systems
- Holli Kimble, Chief Engineer, Defence Equipment and Support
- Dr Eluned Lewis, Team Leader Survivability, QinetiQ Defence and Security
- Dr Salmabanu Luhar, Marie Skłodowska-Curie Postdoctoral Fellow (UK Research and Innovation), University of Sheffield
- Jennifer Maher, Principal Mechanical Engineer, Sellafield Ltd.
- Elena Martin Fernandes, Principal Highways Engineer, Waterman Aspen
- Giulia Marzetti, Senior Carbon Management Consultant, Mott MacDonald
- Jenny McLaughlin, Project Manager, Heathrow Airport Ltd.
- Krishna Mistry, Body Engineering Programme Lead, Volta Trucks
- Faith Natukunda, System Capability Manager, National Grid ESO
- Titilola Oliyide, Senior Process Safety Engineer, Supercritical Solutions
- Stacey Peel, Director Claire Price – Associate Director, WSP UK
- Caroline Roche, Senior Engineer, Capula Ltd
- Anne Seldon, Chief Engineer – Product Safety & Compliance, WAE Technologies
- Nikita Shetti, Payload System Engineer, Airbus Defence and Space
- Professor Nicola Symonds, Director, nC2 Engineering Consultancy, University of Southampton
- Joanne Turner, Project Director, Amey Consulting
- Shiyao Wang, Computer Vision Engineer, Intel Corporation
- Roshni Wijesekera, Senior Fire Engineer, The Fire Surgery Limited
- Catherine Wood, Maintain Design Integrity Group Lead, EDF Energy
- Louise Wood, Senior LEV Engineer, Airducts Design Ltd & Airducts Engineering Ltd.

== 2024 winners (Theme: Enhanced by Engineering) ==
The 2024 winners were announced in July 2024.

- Dr Chika Judith Abolle-Okoyeagu, Head of Department, Robert Gordon University
- Carolyn Ainsworth, Deputy Director Engineering, National Cyber Security Centre
- Nike Amiaka, Technical Professional Leader - Safety (Consultant), Kellogg Brown & Root
- Maira Bana, CFD Manager, RED Engineering Design
- Elva Bannon, Research and Engineering Manager, Wave Energy Scotland
- Danielle, Software Engineer, GCHQ
- Professor Luiza C. Campos, Professor of Environmental Engineering, University College London
- Dr Michele Cano, Head of Engineering and Physical Sciences, University of West of Scotland
- Harpreet Kaur Chahal, Project Manager, HDR Inc.
- Helen Davis, Engineering Manager & Lead Supervising Civil Engineer, Binnies
- Ciara Doherty, Project Manager, Babcock Rail
- Professor Judith Driscoll, Professor, University of Cambridge
- Ghada Elsheikh, Associate, HDR Inc.
- Kim Everitt, Transport Systems Engineer, Energy Systems Catapult
- Nabihah Ghufoor, Engineer, Arup
- Tina Glover, Technical Director, Project Centre
- Catherine Gruber, Principal Mechanical Engineer, Mott MacDonald
- Dr Abigail Hathway, Senior Lecturer, University of Sheffield
- Dr Emma Hellawell, Principal Engineer, LEAP Environmental
- Dr Charlotte Higgins, Associate Director, Arup
- Hiba Khan, Civil Engineer, Mott MacDonald
- Charlotte Kidd, Design and Development Engineer, Renishaw Neuro Solutions
- Dr Desen Kirli, Elizabeth Georgeson Fellow, University of Edinburgh
- Alexandra Koutsouki, Senior Bridge Engineer, Arup
- Voon Lai, Senior Associate EICA Engineer, Mott MacDonald
- Amanda Lake, Head of Carbon and Circular Economy - Water Europe, Jacobs
- Marxileni Lapuz, Senior Sustainability Consultant, Black&White Engineering
- Huyen Le, Doctoral Researcher, Loughborough University
- Dr Cristina-Steliana Mihailovici, Lecturer in Mechanical Engineering, LJMU International Study Centre
- Natalia Narożańska, Lead Simulation Engineer, Evolito Ltd
- Ada Nwadigo, Chief Executive Officer and Co-Founder, Jona Infrastructure Advisory & Eng Trepreneur
- Dr Paula Palade, AI Ethics Senior Technical Specialist, Jaguar Land Rover
- Misha Patel, DPhil Student, University of Oxford
- Muneebah Quyyam, Senior Engineer, AtkinsRealis
- Sanaa Rashid, Space Systems Engineer, Astroscale
- Helen Rowe, Structures and Tunnels Asset Manager, Kent County Council
- Barbara Sacha, Partner, Cundall
- Deeksha Sampath, Technology Transfer Engineer, Warwick Manufacturing Group
- Rachel Sandham, Associate Director, Arup
- Dr Ekaterina Sergeeva, Functional Safety Manager, Battery System Engineering Product Advisor, Accelera by Cummins
- Victoria Sharpe, Managing Director, Exstent Limited
- Amy Shaw, Fens Flood Risk Manager, Environment Agency
- Dr Shini Somara, Fluid Dynamicist and Broadcaster, eSTEAMd Media
- Jacqueline Chinwe Stephen, Future Energy Leader, World Energy Council
- Melanie Thrush, Principal Geoenvironmental Engineer, Arup
- Katie Tidd, Materials Engineer in Engineering Analysis, Evolito Ltd
- Dr Rebecca Wade, Senior Lecturer in Environmental Science, Abertay University
- Emily Walport, Materials Engineer, Arup
- Claire Watson, Water Utilities Delivery Director, Binnies
- Seren White, Survivability Engineer, Defence Equipment and Support

== 2025 winners (Theme: Together We Engineer) ==
- Yewande Akinola , Technical Director, CBRE
- Anam Balbolia, Principal Engineer, WSP
- Julia Barr, Commercial Manager, Mott MacDonald
- Elena Brake, Trainee Engineer and Student, Fishtek and University of Plymouth
- Christina Brugger, Product Consultant/ Founder, InsightSprint
- Denise Cárdenas López, Vice President, Strategic Capability and Integrated Delivery Amentum
- Brigit Coleman-Green, Submarine Delivery Agency; Dreadnought Supply and Support Team
- Emily D, Software Engineer, GCHQ
- Honora Driscoll, Ph.D. student University of Oxford
- Lauren Eatwell, Head of WindWings, BAR Technologies
- Marianne Ellis, Director of CARMA CARMA, EPSRC Sustainable Manufacturing Hub, University of Bath
- Pamela Esin, Associate Director, HDR Inc.
- Anni Feng, Associate Director, Hoare Lea
- Nour Ghadban, Research Assistant (Biomedical Engineering) University of Glasgow
- Priyanka Ghosh, Advanced Research Engineer, The Manufacturing Technology Centre
- Alice Goodwin, Project Engineer – Aircraft Asset Management, Virgin Atlantic
- Poppy Harrison, Senior Engineer, Committee Co-chair, AtkinsRealis
- Rachel Hayden, Senior Civil Engineer, WSP
- Rachael Hazael, Associate Professor in Applied Materials, Cranfield University
- Puja Hazlehurst, Head of Product Engineering, Caeli Nova
- Kareema Hilton, Machining Applications Theme Lead, NMIS
- Fauzia Idrees, Director of Cyber Security, University of London and Global Council for Responsible AI
- Melissa Jordan, Principal Project Manager, HDR Inc.
- Imisi Joseph, Senior Data Analyst, JLR
- Natasha Khan, Nuclear Safety Engineer, Mott MacDonald
- Jolie Lau, Facade Engineer, Arup
- Oana Lazar, Embedded Software Engineer, Tessent Embedded Analytics (Siemens Electronic Design Automation)
- Hannah Livingstone, Materials Engineering Degree Apprentice, Rolls-Royce
- Gail M, Solutions Architect, GCHQ
- Keziah Magit, Final year PhD Student, University of Nottingham
- Kathryn Malcolm, Associate Project Manager, Global Engineering AstraZeneca
- Fay Newham, Associate Engineer, Ramboll
- Rachel Paley, Senior Consultant, Arup
- Cambell Plant, Asset Management Consultant, Binnies UK Ltd
- Vanessa Quansah, Head of Construction Engineering, Lendlease (soon to be Bovis)
- Tanja Radu, Reader in Environmental Engineering, Loughborough University
- Ramsha Saleem, Assistant Engineer, WSP
- Magdalena Sartin, Group Vice President Engineering, Capital Projects and Operational Excellence, Johnson Matthey
- Kelly Shungu, Hardware Engineer, Leonardo
- Barbara Smitten, Associate Director, Cundall
- Meini Su, Senior Lecturer, The University of Manchester
- Jo-Anne Tait, Principal Lecturer, Robert Gordon University
- Ruth Tatanga, Senior Mechanical Engineer, chapmanbdsp
- Evona, The Strategic Foresight Co-founder/Innovation Lead, Jaguar Land Rover
- Anna Terry, Principal mechanical engineer, AWE
- Davina Urquhart, Welding Engineer, AWE PLC (Atomic Weapons Establishment, Aldermaston)
- Julia Ward, UK Project Development Director, Queequeg
- Saima Yasin, Professor University of Engineering & Technology
- Tasneem Yousif, PhD Researcher and Assistant Lecturer, University of Nottingham
- Jun Zang, Professor of Coastal and Ocean Engineering and Deputy Head of Department of Architecture and Civil Engineering, University of Bath

For the list of judges, see the WES website.
