= McClay =

McClay is a Scottish surname. It is derived from Gaelic Mac an Léigh, or possibly a Highland adaptation of the Irish Gaelic Mac Duinnshléibhe (anglicised Donlevy) where the Scots aspirated the “D” and then dropped the final “e” from the Irish language form of the name.

When the north-eastern Irish kingdom of Ulaid fell to John de Courcy in 1177, many of the MacDonlevy dynasty sought asylum in the Highlands of Scotland. Their MacDonlevy surname evolved there first to Maconlea, also, MacConloy, McCloy and, then, to MacALeavy, MacAlea, MacLea, MacLay, McClay and, even, Leevy, Levy (surname) and Leavy. Some sources contend that the surname McClay, like the surname MacKinley, arises instead from a Gaelic language nickname given the MacDonlevy in both the Scottish Highlands and elsewhere. That nickname is Mac an Leigh, translating to English as leech, but meaning a physician. Leeching (medical) was in Gaelic Ireland, Scotland and elsewhere for millennium a pervasive medical therapy. The MacDonlevy were also one of Ireland’s ancient hereditary medical families.

Notable people with the surname include:

- Allen McClay (1932–2010), British businessman
- Andrew McClay (born 1984), Irish actor
- Andy McClay (born 1972), Scottish footballer
- Cathy McClay, British engineer
- David McClay (born 1959), Irish Anglican bishop
- Roger McClay (1945–2025), New Zealand politician
- Ryan McClay (born 1981), American lacrosse player
- Todd McClay (born 1968), New Zealand politician
- Wilfred M. McClay (born 1951), American historian
- Will McClay (born 1966), American footballer and coach

== See also ==
- Clan McLea
- McLay, a surname
