= McLay =

McLay is a surname.

Notable people with the surname include:

- Alma Soller McLay (1919–2017)
- Cameron McLay, American police chief
- Charles McLay (c. 1860–1918), Australian architect
- Colin McLay (1942–2022), New Zealand marine biologist
- Daniel McLay (born 1992), British cyclist
- David McLay (born 1898), Scottish footballer
- George McLay (1889–1917), Scottish footballer
- Greg McLay (born 1969), Australian cricketer
- Jim McLay (born 1945), New Zealand politician
- Laurie McLay, New Zealand autism researcher
- Nathan McLay, founder of Australian independent record label and management company Future Classic

== See also ==
- McClay
- McLay Glacier, a glacier in Antarctica
- Maclay (disambiguation)
- Sky Macklay, American musician
