= Imagineering Foundation =

British charity

- Abbreviation: Imagineering
- Formation: 1999
- Type: Educational charity
- Legal status: Registered charity (1087783)
- Purpose: Participation of schoolchildren in creative engineering activities
- Location: 4 Ashfield Road, Kenilworth, Warwickshire, CV8 2BE
- Region served: UK
- Members: School children aged 8-16
- Chairman: Bob Shanks
- Affiliations: Jaguar Land Rover, National Grid plc
- Website: imagineering.org.uk

The Imagineering Foundation is a British charity organisation that encourages schoolchildren aged 8–16 to engage with engineering.

== History ==
It was formed in 1999 by a group of Midlands engineers who were concerned about a perceived lowering of interest in engineering activities by schoolchildren, leading to a skills shortage in the STEM subjects. It was launched as an educational charity on 31 July 2001.

The website was developed in 2004, with educational material for the clubs.

== Structure ==
It is based in Warwickshire. It also has a substantial online presence with a website built so tutors can access project material.

== Function ==
=== Clubs ===
It currently organizes 147 engineering clubs mostly in England, but with two in Wales and five in Scotland. Most of the clubs are in the West Midlands, and to a lesser extent in the East Midlands (Northamptonshire). Each week, around 1800 children take part in the clubs.

It publishes a magazine called The Imagineer.

=== Fairs ===
It hosts children's engineering fairs at the Royal Bath and West Show, the Royal International Air Tattoo at RAF Fairford, and the International Air Day at RNAS Yeovilton. These events are often attended by people (parents) already interested in engineering - the organization's target audience.

== See also ==
- Manufacturing in the United Kingdom
- Science, Technology, Engineering and Mathematics Network
