= Lih-Ling Highe =

English mechanical engineer

Lih-Ling Highe (born c. 1968) is an English mechanical engineer. She works for Bechtel and her major projects have included the redevelopment of St Pancras International station. Her most influential colleague at Bechtel was Ailie MacAdam. Highe is now project manager for the changes to the Tottenham Court Road station for Crossrail.

== Education ==
Highe is an alumna of St Paul's Girls' School, having studied there from 1984 to 1986. She has a degree in mechanical engineering from University College London, where she was one of four women in a class of 60.

== Career ==
Highe's first job after graduating from university was for a mechanical seals company in Singapore. She then worked as a process systems engineer at Bechtel in petrochemical plant design. During this time she was involved in many international projects, including India's Jamnagar Refinery (the largest oil refinery ever built at the time of its completion in 2000). After a 14-month secondment in Houston, USA, Highe returned to London to work in project controls, producing bids for oil, gas and chemical sector contracts.

Highe initially worked as a civil engineer on the High Speed 1 rail project in a primarily risk management role. She later became a field engineer on the project, working on St Pancras International station. After this project, Highe began working on the Crossrail project, first as a cost engineer and then as an interface manager. She is currently the project manager for the new Tottenham Court Road station for the London Underground Elizabeth Line and was featured in this role in the documentary The Fifteen Billion Pound Railway in 2019.

== Personal life ==
Highe's father and two siblings are also mechanical engineers. She has two children. She is married to Philip Highe, also an engineer.
