= By the Grace of God =

Formulaic and constitutional phrase

By the Grace of God (Latin: Dei Gratia, abbreviated D.G.) is a formulaic phrase used especially in Christian monarchies as an introductory part of the full style of a monarch. In England and later the United Kingdom, the phrase was formally added to the royal style in 1521 and continues to be used. It is also used by bishops. For example, on UK coinage, the abbreviation DG appears today.

== History and rationale ==
Originally, it had a literal meaning: the divine right of kings was invoked—notably by Christian monarchs—as legitimation (the only one above every sublunary power) for the absolutist authority the monarch wielded, that is, the endorsement of God for the monarch's reign.

By custom, the phrase "by the Grace of God" is restricted to sovereign rulers; in the feudal logic, a vassal held fief not by the grace of God, but by grant of a superior noble. Yet this did not stop kings using it, even when they did homage to the pope (as vicegerent of God) or another ruler, such as the Kingdom of Bavaria, a state of the Holy Roman Empire.

Parallels exist in other civilizations, e.g. Mandate of Heaven of the Chinese empire, where for centuries the official decrees by the emperors of China invariably began with the phrase 「奉天承運，皇帝詔曰」 which is translated as "The Emperor, by the Grace of Heaven, decrees".

== Contemporary usage ==
The traditional phrase "by the grace of God" is still included in the full titles and styles of the monarchs of Denmark, Liechtenstein, the Netherlands, Monaco and the United Kingdom.

In other Commonwealth realms, who share the same monarch with the United Kingdom, the style is used in Antigua and Barbuda, Australia, The Bahamas, Belize, Canada, Grenada, Jamaica, New Zealand, Solomon Islands, St. Kitts and Nevis, St Lucia, St. Vincent and the Grenadines, and Tuvalu. Papua New Guinea does not use the style.

The phrase was used in Luxembourg until 2000, when Grand Duke Henri decided to drop it. During the 20th-century dictatorship of Francisco Franco in Spain, Spanish coins bore a legend identifying him as Francisco Franco Caudillo de España por la G de Dios ("Francisco Franco Caudillo of Spain by the G(race) of God").

The phrase is not used in the monarchy of Belgium, which is explicitly a popular monarchy whose royal status is formally granted by the will of the people rather than by divine authority; the title is accordingly "King of the Belgians" rather than "King of Belgium". The phrase was previously used in three European monarchies that have since ceased to do so: Luxembourg (after the abdication of Grand Duke Jean in 2000), Norway (after the death of King Haakon VII, in 1957) and Sweden (after the death of King Gustav VI Adolf in 1973). In Spain, article 56(2) of the 1978 constitution, states that the title of the King of Spain is simply "King of Spain" (Rey de España) but that he "can use the titles that correspond to the Crown". As a result, the King of Spain may use "by the grace of God", but this is not used on official documents.

== Variant examples ==
In some cases, the formula was combined with a reference to another legitimation, especially such democratic notions as the social contract, e.g.

- Prince Louis-Napoléon Bonaparte was crowned Napoléon III, Emperor of the French, By the Grace of God and the Will of the Nation (Par la Grâce de Dieu, et la Volonté Nationale) after a plebiscite organised among the French people.
- Oliver Cromwell was Lord Protector by the Grace of God, and the Republic, denoting that he was chosen by God to rule but he was put there by the people of the 'Commonwealth' (British republic).
- Agustín de Iturbide of Mexico was styled Agustín I, By the Providence of God, Constitutional Emperor of Mexico. Mexico's second emperor, Maximilian, used the style "By the Grace of God and Will of the People, Emperor of Mexico."
- By the Grace of God and the Will of the Nation (Per Grazia di Dio e Volontà della Nazione) in the Kingdom of Italy, as well as in the Italian Empire, where the king was styled By the Grace of God and the Will of the [Italian] Nation King of Italy, King of Albania, Emperor of Ethiopia which though omitted the titularity as King of Cyprus and Jerusalem which had instead styled the House of Savoy previously and along with Duke of Savoia, King of Sardinia, Prince of Piedmont
- By the Grace of God and the Will of People in the Kingdom of Serbia and the Kingdom of Yugoslavia. The same title was used in the Polish–Lithuanian Commonwealth when, starting with King Henryk Walezy and ending with King Stanisław August Poniatowski, the king was chosen by the noblemen in a free election.
- Sovereigns of the Kingdom of Hawai'i were styled "By the Grace of God and under the Constitution of the Hawaiian Islands, King (or Queen)"
- Brazilian emperors used the style "By the Grace of God and Unanimous Acclamation of the Peoples, Constitutional Emperor and Perpetual Defender of Brazil" ("Pela Graça de Deus e Unânime Aclamação dos Povos, Imperador Constitucional e Defensor Perpétuo do Brasil") in the constitutional Empire of Brazil.
- By the Grace of God, Baron of the Bachuil style is also used by the Chief of Livingstone.
- By the Grace of the One and Only God (Dengan Rahmat Tuhan Yang Maha Esa) in Indonesia. The Lawmaking Act of 2011 requires all legislation to begin with this formula.
- By the grace of Heaven as used by the Empire of Japan refers to the assertion that the ancestors of the Emperor of Japan were divine, as described in the Kojiki.

== See also ==
- Billah
- Dei Gratia Rex, discussing the use of the phrase on coins
- Grace in Christianity
- Mandate of Heaven
