= Kirsten Bodley =

British businesswoman

- Education: King’s College; Imperial College London
- Known for: CEO of the Women’s Engineering Society and Institute of Asset Management

Kirsten Bodley is the British current chief executive of the Institute of Asset Management and former chief executive officer of the Women’s Engineering Society.

== Early life and education ==
Kirsten Bodley studied chemistry at King’s College before working as a senior group leader in Courtauld’s from September 1987 to July 1996. She then attended Imperial College, London and graduated with an MBA in innovation.

When employed in Courtauld's, Bodley worked as a development chemist where she developed products and supervised scale-ups in the plant. The main focus of her work was the food and beverage side of the canning industry.

== Career ==
KPMG hired Bodley as a principal management consultant in 1997 where she mainly focused on research and development in the fields of chemistry and pharmaceuticals before leaving them in 2002.

Bodley then returned to education to get a PGCE in teaching before working as a primary school teacher in Claygate Primary School from 2004 to 2005.^{[3]}

Bodley became a regional director in Science, Technology, Engineering and Mathematics Network in 2005, the director of networks in 2008 and worked as the network’s CEO from 2010 to 2016. When working for Science, Technology, Engineering and Mathematics Network, Bodley was involved in initiatives such as the Cisco STEM Challenge, STEM Clubs and the STEM Ambassadors programme.

In 2016 she became the chief executive of the Women's Engineering Society, taking over from Dawn Bonfield MBE. Here she worked to introduce incentives in order to attract more women to the sector of Engineering. This work mainly involved the 'Raising the Bar' theme and 'Men as Allies' theme.

As of August 2018 Bodley has worked as the chief executive of the Institute of Asset Management.

== Awards and accolades ==
- Member of the Society of Chemical Industry.
- Judged the 2017 Top 50 Influential Women in Engineering List.
- Trustee at Founders4Schools.
