= McCloy =

McCloy, MacCloy or MacLoy is a Scottish surname. It is believed to have the same origins as MacLowe and MacLewis. This group of surnames are generally believed to be an offshoot of the Fullarton clan of Ayrshire – that is, a Lewis Fullarton mentioned in records from the reign of King Robert III of Scotland (c. 1337 – 1406): "Two Sons Went out of the house of Fullarton one of the Name of Lewis and the other James. Lewis went to Arran and was called McLewis or McCloy and he Acquired Lands in Arran holding of the Croun and was made Crouner [chief officer of the Crown] of Arran." Variations including MacLewis or MacLoy are mentioned in records from the 16th century.

However, according to another theory, the same Scots surnames may have Irish origins and not be related to the MacCloys of Arran. This theory derives from a single account originally published in 1923, which states that the surname arose from a mutation of the surname of the Irish MacDunleavy (Gaelic language MacDuinnshléibhe) dynasty, exiled in the 12th century to the Highlands of Scotland, after the English conquest of the Dunleavys lands in Ulaid (modern southeastern Ulster). Previously the Dunleavys were the rulers of Ulaid (which also have rise to the surname Mac an Ultaigh or MacNulty) and the last line of historical Kings of Ulster.

Prominent people with the surname McCloy include:

- Helen McCloy (1904–1994); US mystery writer (under the pseudonym Helen Clarkson)
- Jeff McCloy (1949–2025); Australian politician
- John C. McCloy (1876–1945); US Navy sailor and double-recipient of the Medal of Honor
- John J. McCloy (1895–1989); US lawyer, banker and Assistant Secretary of War
- Peter McCloy; Scottish football player
- Phillip McCloy (1896–1972); Scottish football player
- Randal L. McCloy, Jr; sole survivor of the 2006 Sago Mine disaster

== See also ==
Clan MacLea/Livingstone
