= Caroline Hargrove =

Canadian engineer

Caroline Hargrove CBE FREng
- Born: Caroline Hogue
- Education: Queen's University; University of Cambridge (PhD)
- Scientific career
- Workplaces: Babylon Health; McLaren Applied Technologies
- Thesis: Computer modelling of the motion of granular particles (1993)
- Doctoral advisor: David Newland

Caroline Hargrove CBE FREng (née Hogue, born March 1968) is Chief Technical Officer of Ceres Power. She previously served as CTO at Zedsen, Babylon Health, McLaren Applied Technologies and as a visiting professor at the University of Oxford.

== Early life and education ==
Hargrove is from Montreal, Quebec. She studied mathematics and mechanical engineering at Queen's University, Ontario, which she graduated in 1989. She moved to the University of Cambridge for her postgraduate studies, earning a PhD for research on computer modelling of granular materials supervised by David Newland in 1993.

== Career ==
After her postgraduate studies, Hargrove remained at the University of Cambridge as a Fellow of Sidney Sussex College. She joined McLaren in 1997, where she worked in vehicle dynamics. For ten years she was responsible for the McLaren F1 simulator. She was one of the founders of McLaren Applied Technologies as Programme Director in 2007, then Technical Director in 2013 and CTO in 2018. Her job involved R&D strategy and IP development. She championed the use of big data in motor racing. She helped translate the technology of McLaren to medical services, developing analysis and support tools. She worked with Olympic athletes and the UK track cycling team. She created a data-logger that mounts under the saddle to collect information of speed, power, tilt and torque, then send it to the coach. Her team translated the 3D accelerometers from Formula One cars into sensors for human use, working with GlaxoSmithKline to monitor patient's response to drugs. In 2016 she announced the use of their simulator for testing domestic vehicles.

She was a Visiting Professor in the Nuffield Department of Surgery at Oxford University from 2015-2018.

In 2018 she became the CTO of Babylon Health, focussing on the use of AI to diagnose patients.

In April 2021 she was named as CTO of Zedsen, a UK based startup that provides non-invasive blood sugar monitoring technology.

Later that year she joined Ceres Power (developers of fuel cell and green hydrogen technology) as Chief Technology Officer, having been a non-executive director of the company for the previous three years. She remained as a non-executive at Zedsen.

Hargrove is an advocate for increasing the number of girls and women in engineering through visits to schools and on-site work experience.

=== Awards and honours ===
In 2016 Hargrove was named one of the Women's Engineering Society and The Daily Telegraph's Top 50 Influential Women in Engineering.

She was elected a Fellow of the Royal Academy of Engineering in 2017, and was subsequently profiled in the in-house magazine Ingenia. In the same year she was announced as one of the Top 50 Innovators in the World by Codex.

She was appointed Commander of the Order of the British Empire (CBE) in the 2020 New Year Honours for services to engineering.

In 2023 she was awarded an honorary degree from Queen's University.

=== Media Appearances ===
In 2014 she appeared on BBC Radio 4, where she discussed how Britain became a world leader in Formula One cars.

She was the subject of The Life Scientific on BBC Radio 4 hosted by Jim Al-Khalili on 20 November 2018.

on 6 March 2020 The BBC World Service featured Hogue on their World Wise Web series being interviewed by a 16 year old motor racing fan about the F1 simulator.
