= Jayne Bryant (engineer) =

British software engineer

Jayne Bryant FREng FIET FWES, is Engineering Director for BAE Systems, Applied Intelligence. She has over 40 years’ experience in engineering.

== Early life and education ==
Bryant was educated at Maidstone Girls Grammar School, when she decided on a career in software engineering. She began working for Marconi Avionics as a trainee software engineer, undertaking a day release HNC Computing course at Medway College and after two years was offered the opportunity to do an Advanced Avionics Computing Certificate course, which ran for a further year. By the time Bryant completed her training she has a team of 12 graduates working for her.

== Career ==
Bryant's career as a Software Engineer grew into software management, becoming responsible for a major software development with over 300 engineers before she reached 30. From that point on, her scope increased beyond software and took a more general Engineering and Project Management direction.

Bryant continued to progress through roles with various defence organisations including Chief Engineer at GEC - Marconi Avionics Maritime Aircraft Systems Division; Head of Engineering Strategy and CMMI at SELEX Sensors and Airborne Systems; Engineering Director for BAE Systems, Platform Solutions at Rochester, chair of the EPWG (Engineering Process Working Group) at BAE Systems Performance Excellence and Engineering Director for BAE Systems Defence Information.

Bryant heads up a team of 1400 engineers as Engineering Director for BAE Systems, Applied Intelligence.

Bryant's career is highlighted in the publication "Championing Women Leaders".

== Awards ==
- Fellow of the IET June 2005
- Fellow of WES in May 2015
- Fellow of the Royal Academy of Engineering (FREng) in July 2010
- Served on the IET Board of Trustees.
- Top 50 Influential Women in Engineering in the UK by the Daily Telegraph and Women's Engineering Society (WES) 2016

== Personal life ==
Bryant is married and has adult triplets.
