= Jane Simpson (engineer) =

British engineer

- Education: Coventry University University of Birmingham University of Cambridge
- Employer: Severn Trent
- Known for: Engineering

Jane Simpson is the Head of Asset Creation at Severn Trent Water. She was the first woman to be Chief Engineer at Network Rail.

== Education ==
Simpson grew up in Coventry. She was inspired to become an engineer when she made a light bulb work on the WISE Campaign bus in the 1980s. She was advised to consider a career in teaching or being a nursery nurse. Simpson has been a lifelong member of the Scouts. She gained her Baden-Powell Award as a Guide and her Queen's Scout Award as a Venture Scout. She left school at 16 and started an apprenticeship at General Electric. They went on to sponsor her to complete a degree in Electronics and Communications Engineering at Coventry University. She completed a master's degree in Electrical and Electronic Engineering at the University of Birmingham.

== Career ==
Simpson joined British Rail in Quayside Tower as a graduate in 1996, which was the year of its privatisation. Working in one of the maintenance companies for infrastructure, she became Overhead Line Engineer in 1998. She led the Overhead line between Euston and Rugby. She was the first woman to hold the role, and says that male engineers did not know how to behave in front of her. She worked for Marconi Communications and returned Network Rail in 2004. She joined the Infrastructure Maintenance Department in 2009, and was promoted to Director of Route Asset Management of the London and North Western Railway in 2011. She was responsible for the electrification of train lines in the North of England. She became a Fellow of the Institution of Engineering and Technology in 2014.

She became Chief Engineer in 2015. She was responsible for £600 million of projects, and ensured that money was spent correctly to improve the UK's rail infrastructure. She championed innovation in engineering whilst ensuring the customer saw the value of all investment. These included mechatronics and small track-side robots which could provide intelligent inspection in situ. She led a multimillion-pound project to digitise information systems at Network Rail.

In 2016 she was listed as one of the UK's Top 50 Influential Women in Engineering. She was chosen as one of the 20 Most Inspirational Women in Rail.

She was appointed to Severn Trent in July 2016. Here she is responsible for all above ground infrastructure, including ensuring water is clean, waste water is treated and that renewable energy is explored. She was listed in the Top 100 Women to Watch in the 2017 FTSE Board Report.

Simpson is a campaigner for increased diversity in engineering. At Network Rail, she launched work experience and open evenings to attract more girls into the profession. She is a trustee of The Scout Association.
