= Ailie MacAdam =

British engineer and manager

Ailie MacAdam FICE
- Born: Ailie Jane Comer MacAdam; 6 October 1962 (age 63); Edmonton, London
- Education: University of Bradford
- Known for: Big Dig; CrossRail; Sydney Metro; Channel Tunnel Rail Link; St Pancras railway station
- Awards: Top 50 Influential Women in Engineering (2016)
- Scientific career
- Fields: Civil engineering
- Workplaces: Bechtel
- Website: bechtel.com/about-us/leadership/ailie-macadam

Ailie Jane Comer MacAdam (born 6 October 1962) is a British engineer, a senior vice president of Bechtel Corporation. She was formerly commercial manager for a section of Crossrail.

== Education ==
The eldest of her parents' four children, MacAdam was born in Edmonton, London, the daughter of Gilchrist G. MacAdam, a mechanical engineer, from Milngavie in East Dunbartonshire, north of Glasgow.

She grew up in Chrishall, halfway between the A10 and the M11, a few miles east of Saffron Walden, where she went to primary school. She attended Saffron Walden County High School. Throughout the 1970s to 1990s she played hockey for Saffron Walden, playing centre-half. She studied GCE Advanced Levels in maths, physics and chemistry in sixth form.

She was educated at the University of Bradford, where she was awarded a Master of Science degree in chemical engineering.

== Career ==
MacAdam has worked in a senior capacity on several megaprojects during her career including CrossRail in London, High Speed 1, the Big Dig in Boston, the upgrade of St Pancras railway station into a Eurostar terminal (completed in 2007) and the Sydney Metro in Australia. From July 2014 until March 2015 she was managing director for global rail for Bechtel. In the UK's Network Rail only 5 out of 88 engineers are women.

=== Bechtel ===
She joined Bechtel on a graduate training programme in 1985, in its oil and gas division. She was a director of Bechtel Limited in the UK from June 2014 until April 2017.

=== Channel Tunnel Rail Link ===
From September 2003 to July 2008 she worked with Bechtel on the Channel Tunnel Rail Link, which became known as High Speed 1.

=== Crossrail ===
From April 2009 until July 2014 she was delivery director for the Central Section of Crossrail, with 21 km of twin-tube tunnel and six underground stations. This is Europe's largest engineering project. She was also the bid project manager for the Crossrail project. Bechtel built the central section of Crossrail where it formed one-half of Tube Lines.

=== Awards and honours ===
She was listed in the Top 50 Influential Women in Engineering in 2016 by the Women's Engineering Society. She works with STEMNET. She was elected a Fellow of the Institution of Civil Engineers (FICE) and interviewed by Jim Al-Khalili for The Life Scientific first broadcast in February 2018 on BBC Radio 4.

MacAdam was awarded an honorary degree, DEng (Doctor of Engineering honoris causa) from her alma mater The University of Bradford on 8 December 2022.

== Personal life ==
Her godfather was a chemical engineer and her father was a mechanical engineer. She is married, and has a son and daughter. Both her children were born in Boston, USA. She was married in August 1995 to Ade Sofolarin, a chemical engineer and rugby union player, at Holy Trinity church in Chishall.

Her son, Femi Sofolarin, born 22 January 2000, is a rugby union player, like his father. Femi, educated at Dulwich College when the family lived in Beckenham in south-east London. He played for Scotland in the 2022 Commonwealth Games. Her daughter attended James Allen's Girls' School, competing in the discus at the Aviva English Schools Track & Field Championships in July 2012 at Gateshead, also competing in many other athletics championships, training with Blackheath and Bromley Harriers Athletic Club, alongside sprinter Dina Asher-Smith, then studied Psychology until 2018 at the University of Nottingham, where she played hockey for the university squad.
