= Michèle Dix =

British civil engineer

- Born: 5 February 1955 (age 71)
- Engineering career
- Discipline: Civil
- Institutions: Institution of Civil Engineers
- Awards: Top 50 Influential Women in Engineering (2016)

Michèle Dix CBE (born 5 February 1955) is a British civil engineer. She is the managing director of Crossrail 2 and had previously been the director of planning for Transport for London. In 2016, Dix was named as one of the Top 50 Influential Women in Engineering.

== Early life ==
As Michèle Holland, she attended Cleethorpes Girls' Grammar School.

Dix gained a degree in civil engineering from the University of Leeds before studying for a Doctor of Philosophy degree in transport and land use planning at the university's Institute for Transport Studies which she was awarded in 1982.

== Career ==
She worked for the Greater London Council for six years as a traffic planner developing traffic policies and planning new road schemes. She became a chartered engineer through the council's graduate development scheme.

Dix subsequently joined engineering consultancy Halcrow Fox and became their board director for urban transport planning. She is a fellow of the Institution of Civil Engineers, of the Chartered Institution of Highways and Transportation and of the Chartered Institute of Logistics and Transport.

After 15 years at Halcrow, Dix joined Transport for London in 2000 as co-director of congestion charging, in which role she was responsible for development of the London Low Emission Zone. She was promoted to managing director of planning in 2007 with responsibilities for planning the future transport needs of London, coordinating local plans and developing major transportation schemes.

On 5 February 2015 she was made managing director of Crossrail 2, a proposed £27 billion high-capacity rail line to connect Surrey and Hertfordshire with London and provide additional capacity to the rail network.

Dix was appointed Commander of the Order of the British Empire (CBE) in the 2015 New Year Honours for services to transport in London. She was described as "the best transport planner in Britain" by Sir Peter Hendy and was named as one of the Top 50 Influential Women in Engineering in 2016. Dix has stated that when she retires she would like to "run a tea room – baking cakes and serving teas".

== Personal life ==
She married in 1977, with a son and daughter.
