= Cleethorpes Academy =

Coed secondary school in England

Location
- Grainsby Avenue; Cleethorpes, North East Lincolnshire, DN35 9NX; England
- Coordinates: 53°32′53″N 0°2′19″W

Information
- Type: Academy
- Established: 2010
- Specialists: Mathematics; ICT; Humanities
- Department for Education URN: 136192 Tables
- Ofsted: Reports
- Chief Executive: Martin Brown
- Headteacher: Paul Thundercliffe
- Gender: Coeducational
- Age: 11 to 16
- Houses: Capella, Rigel, Sirius, Antares
- Colours: Purple, Turquoise
- Website: cleethorpesacademy.co.uk

Cleethorpes Academy is a coeducational secondary school with academy status, based in Cleethorpes, North East Lincolnshire, England. The school opened in September 2010, on the site previously occupied by the Lindsey School and Community Arts College. Cleethorpes Academy is owned and operated by Tollbar MAT, an educational trust formed in May 2012 as a group of schools in the Lincolnshire LEA. The decision to close the Lindsey School and open Cleethorpes Academy, came after the former was placed in special measures by Ofsted, the Government appointed schools inspectorate.

== History ==
=== Grammar school ===
The school originated as an amalgamation of 'Cleethorpes Girls' Grammar School' and North Cleethorpes Secondary Modern School, becoming a comprehensive co-educational school in 1973. The grammar school dated back to 1926. Cleethorpes' corresponding former boys' grammar school became known as Matthew Humberstone School, which went comprehensive at the same time, but closed in 2010, and was replaced by St Andrew's College, Cleethorpes.

=== Comprehensive ===
It became a comprehensive in 1973, and had a sixth form, when under the jurisdiction of the Lindsey Education Committee, based in Lincoln (from which it received its name). It merged with North Cleethorpes Secondary School, a secondary modern school, on Elliston Street. A year later it joined the LEA of Humberside County Council, based in Beverley. In the 1980s, when still in Humberside, the school was well-regarded, with a good academic reputation.

=== Closure of sixth form ===
The sixth form was closed in July 2008 which it shared with the Matthew Humberstone C of E School, Cleethorpes' two former grammar schools. It was known as the Cleethorpes Sixth Form. By 2008 it was receiving low A level results.

=== Closure of the Lindsey School ===
In October 2009, headteacher Diane Johnson refused to return to the school, when it was reported unofficially that the school was to be placed in special measures following its Ofsted inspection. Johnson resigned officially a month later, after the OFSTED report was published, confirming the schools special measures status. She was replaced on an interim basis by Jim Cunningham who was drafted in as a result of his experience with other failing schools in the area. In March 2010 however, the schools minister accepted a proposal from Tollbar Edge to replace the Lindsey School with an academy, and it eventually closed at the end of the academic year in July 2010.

== Cleethorpes Academy ==
Cleethorpes Academy opened at the start of the new academic year in September 2010. Since it has turned into Cleethorpes Academy, it has continued to improve with exam results improving year on year, 2012 results saw Cleethorpes Academy moving above the national average for 5+ GCSEs at grades 9-4 including English and Maths. Ofsted in 2012 have also reported that the academy is making good progress to improve.

== Alumni ==
=== Lindsey School ===
- Chris Hargreaves former professional football player, clubs include Grimsby Town, Oxford United and Northampton Town.
- Peter Winn (footballer) a young footballer currently playing for Barton Town F.C.

=== Cleethorpes Girls' Grammar School ===
- Shirley Brasher (née Bloomer), tennis player, married Chris Brasher, and won the French Open in 1957 (defeating Dorothy Knode in straight sets), also winning three Grand Slam titles
- Michèle Dix CBE née Holland, civil engineer, managing director from 2015 to 2021 of Crossrail 2
