= Linda Miller (engineer) =

US civil engineer

- Education: United States Military Academy; University of California, Berkeley
- Employer: Bechtel
- Known for: Crossrail

Linda Jean Miller OBE (born 1961) is an American civil engineer who works for Bechtel. She is currently director of the excavation works for the Sydney Metro project, having recently been in charge of Crossrail's Farringdon Station.

== Education ==
Miller is from Arizona. She has a bachelor's degree in engineering from United States Military Academy in West Point, New York. After graduating, Miller started her career in the United States Army, where she flew helicopters. She earned a master's degree in engineering from the University of California, Berkeley.

== Career ==
Miller has worked at Bechtel for more than 35 years. Throughout her career she has been a champion of engineering projects that leave a positive legacy. While working on the Boston Central Artery, a 161-mile road and tunnel project, she appeared on a PBS documentary. She worked on a new launch project at Cape Canaveral and the Seattle Monorail Project.

She worked on the Connaught Tunnel, a Victorian rail tunnel built in 1878 between Stratford and North Woolwich. At the start the team only had 135 year-old drawings as a guide, and had to use giant props to support the excavation. She described the project as 'open heart surgery'. She thinks it is boom time for tunnelling, with new technology putting the UK at the cutting-edge. She was seconded as project manager of Farringdon station. The station includes platform and concourse tunnels, ticket halls, escalators, and adits built using sprayed concrete lining. In March 2017, Miller left the UK and moved to Australia to begin work on the Sydney Metro.

She encourages all young women she meets to consider careers in engineering; including the children of Crossrail staff. She was selected as one of the Top 50 Influential Women in Engineering in the UK in 2016. That year, she was shortlisted for the WISE Campaign 2016 Woman of the Year Award. She appeared on the BBC Two documentary about Crossrail, The Fifteen Billion Pound Railway. She has been a speaker at the Royal Institution, the Institution of Civil Engineers and Farringdon station. In 2017 she was awarded an OBE in the Queen's Birthday Honours for "services to engineering and to promoting gender equality".
