= Maclay =

Maclay may refer to:

== Institutions ==
- Maclay School, PK–12 private school in Tallahassee, Florida
- Claremont School of Theology, formerly the Maclay School of Theology, Claremont, California
- Maclays Brewery, brewery in Alloa, Scotland

== Places ==
- Alfred B. Maclay Gardens State Park, Tallahassee, Florida
- Maclay Mansion, Tipton, Missouri

== People ==
- Alasdair Maclay (born 1973), English cricketer
- Ally Maclay (born 1984), Hong Kong rugby union player
- Charles Maclay (1822–1890), California State Senator and Methodist minister
- Charles Maclay (anatomist) (1913–1978), Scottish anatomist and surgeon
- Edgar Stanton Maclay (1863–1919), American journalist and historian
- John Maclay, 1st Viscount Muirshiel (1905–1992), Secretary of State for Scotland
- Baron Maclay, peerage. Held by:
  - Joseph Maclay, 1st Baron Maclay (1857–1951), Glasgow shipowner and Minister of Shipping (1916–1921)
  - Joseph Maclay, 2nd Baron Maclay (1899–1969), Scottish peer and Liberal politician
- Kaleo Kanahele Maclay (born 1996), American Paralympic volleyball player
- Margaret Maclay Bogardus (1804–1878), American miniature painter
- Nicholas Miklouho-Maclay (1846–1888), Russian explorer, ethnologist, anthropologist and biologist
- Robert Samuel Maclay (1824–1907), Methodist Episcopal Church missionary, associated with Fuzhou
- Robert Maclay (merchant) (1834–1898), merchant, executive, banker, School Board member
- Robert Plunket Maclay (1820–1903), Confederate States Army officer
- Samuel Maclay (1741–1811), Surveyor from Pennsylvania
- William Maclay (Pennsylvania politician, born 1737) (1737–1804), from Pennsylvania
- William Maclay (Pennsylvania politician, born 1765) (1765–1825), U.S. Representative from Pennsylvania
- William B. Maclay (1812–1882), US Representative from New York
- William Plunkett Maclay (1774–1842), US Representative from Pennsylvania
- William P. Maclay (Medal of Honor) (1877–1943), for heroism during the Philippine–American War

=== Fictional ===
- Tara Maclay, from Buffy the Vampire Slayer

=== Middle name ===
- Robert Maclay Widney (1838–1929), California judge and a founder of the University of Southern California
- Thaddeus Maclay Mahon (1838–1918), soldier, attorney, railroad executive, and Republican U.S. Representative from Pennsylvania
- Maclay Hoyne (1872–1939), American politician and lawyer
- William Maclay Awl (1799–1876), alienist, politician, and mental health hospital administrator from Pennsylvania

== See also ==
- McClay
- McLay (disambiguation)
- Sky Macklay
