= Angela Seeney =

British energy engineer

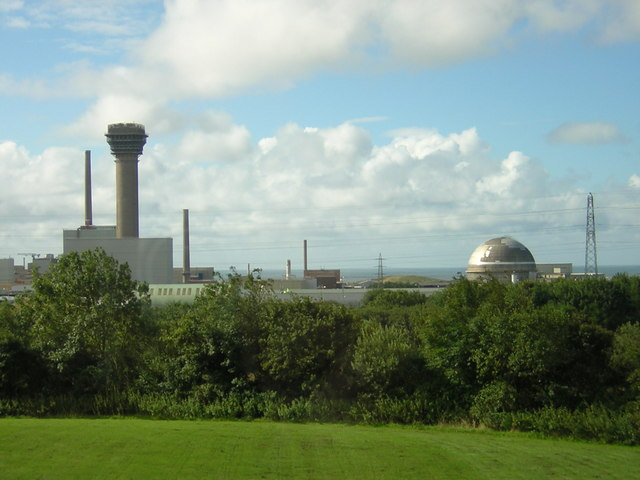
Sellafield

Angela Seeney is a British energy engineer and is Transformation Director at the nuclear decommissioning company Sellafield Ltd.

== Education ==
Seeney has a bachelor's degree from the University of Birmingham (1980), and a Ph.D. (1986) in Corrosion Engineering, Metallurgy and Materials also from Birmingham.

== Career ==
Seeney worked for Shell for some years before 2015 when she was appointed as Director, Technology and Projects of the Oil and Gas Authority, and in 2016 was appointed to lead its Technology, Supply Chain and Data (TSD) directorate.

She is now Transformation Director at Sellafield Ltd.

== Awards ==
In 2016 Seeney was recognised as one of the UK's "Top 50 Influential Women in Engineering" by the Women's Engineering Society and The Telegraph.
