= Phebe Mann =

British engineer

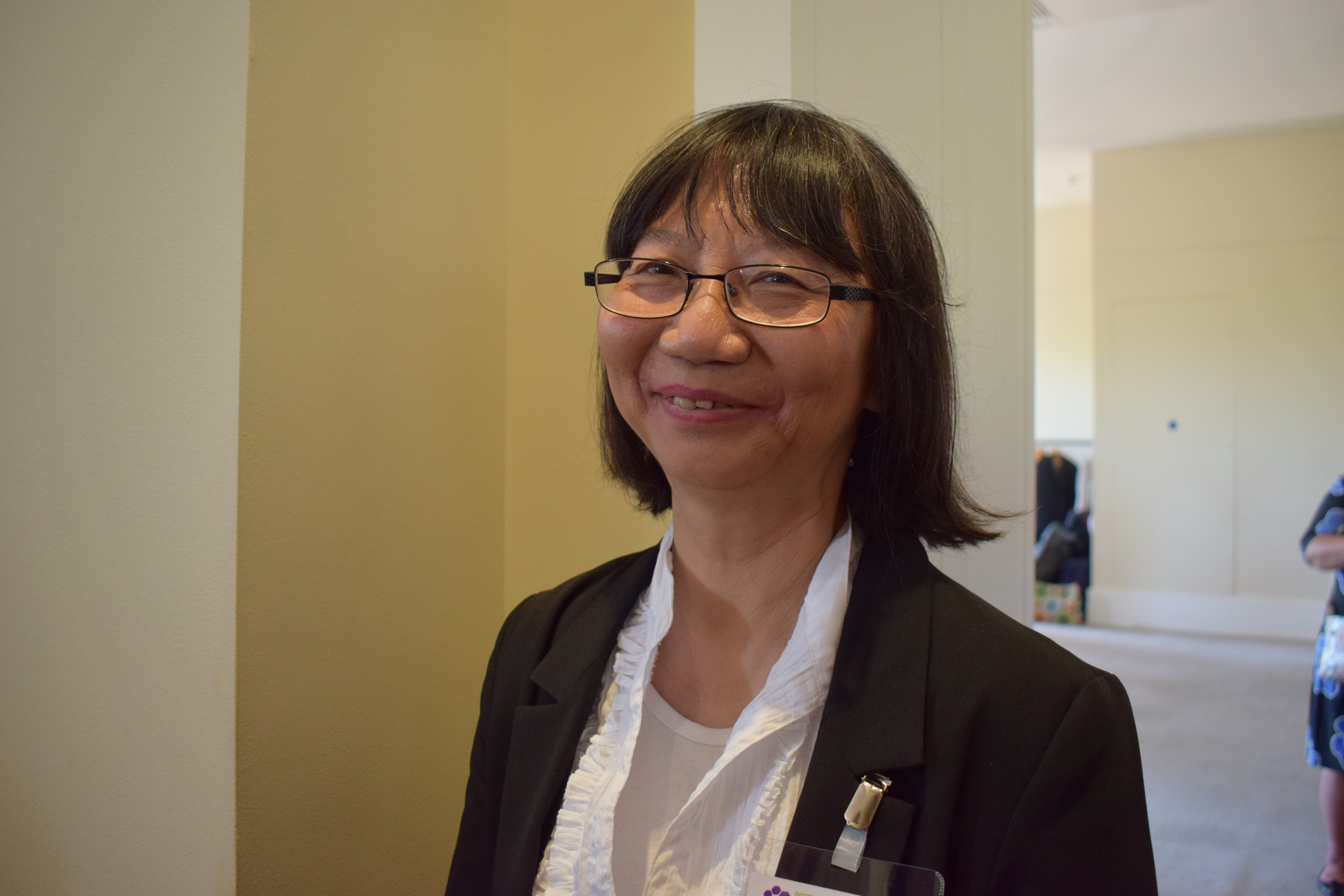
- Education: Loughborough University Cambridge University; City, University of London; Reading University; Surrey University; Robert Gordon University University of Buckingham
- Scientific career
- Workplaces: University of East London; University of Westminster; The Open University; University of Law

Phebe Mann is Deputy Chair of Council, Institution of Civil Engineers (ICE), Chair of the Institution of Civil Engineers London. She is a visiting professor of Construction Law, Management, and Engineering at Loughborough University and was an associate professor in highway and transportation at the University of East London. As a Chartered Civil Engineer, Chartered Surveyor, European Engineer, Chartered Construction Manager, and Fellow of the Chartered Institute of Arbitrators, Mann is the first woman engineer of minority ethnic origin appointed by the Lord Chancellor to the Upper Tribunal (Transport Jurisdiction), General Regulatory Chamber (Transport, Information Rights & Estate Agents Jurisdictions), Tax Chamber and Agricultural Land Tribunal for Wales. Phebe was the winner of the Woman of Outstanding Achievement Tomorrow's Leader Award. Phebe is also the first and only woman to hold eight professional qualifications concurrently in the UK. She has been recognised with a Top 50 Women in Engineering Award (WE50) for her outstanding achievements in engineering. Phebe was an ICE QUEST Scholar for her Interdisciplinary Design of the Built Environment at Cambridge Institute of Sustainability Leadership (CISL).

== Early life and education ==
Mann achieved her City & Guilds Plumbing and Electrical Installation Qualifications with distinctions in all the modules at The College of Haringey, Enfield, and North East London. Mann's father was involved with Scouting. Mann holds many professional qualifications. She earned a master's degree in Computer Science from Hughes Hall, Cambridge. She was in the first ever cohort of University of Cambridge students studying Interdisciplinary Design for the Built Environment. She completed a master's degree in Construction Management at Loughborough University. She also holds a law degree from the University of Buckingham, LLM in Construction Law, Arbitration, and Adjudication from the Robert Gordon University, a Master in Bridge Engineering from University of Surrey, a postgraduate certificate in academic practice from Reading University, and a Masters in Research Methods and PhD in Collaborative Design from the Open University.

== Research and career ==
Mann has made considerable contributions to engineering and legal education. Mann was the first woman to be elected chair of the Leicester Centre of the Chartered Institute of Building Initiation of Civil Engineers London. She completed construction projects for the City of Westminster and Cambridgeshire County Council. As an engineer, Mann worked on the Stump Cross for Four Went Ways, Little Venice and the A1 road. She won the 2011 WISE Campaign’s Women of Outstanding Achievement Tomorrow’s Leader Award. Mann was a member of the Honourable Society of Lincoln's Inn.

In June 2018, Mann completed a Bar Professional Training Course at City, University of London. a Diploma in Legal Practice at De Montfort University. Phebe was called to the Bar at Lincoln's Inn in 2020. She is a consultant at the Open University and Senior lecturer at the University of Westminster, and RICS Programme Director University of Reading. Mann was made an Honorary Fellow of Bradford College in 2013.

She is a Talent2030 Hero. A portrait of Mann was commissioned in 2012 after she won the Tomorrow's Leader award, which she donated to Bradford College in 2012. She was listed as one of the United Kingdom's Top 50 Influential Women in Engineering in 2018. Mann is a warrant leader with the Guide Association, and develops activities based on engineering to develop girls' confidence.
