= Jacqueline Castle =

British aerospace engineer

- Occupation: Engineer
- Engineering career
- Discipline: Aerospace engineering
- Institutions: Airbus

Jacqueline Castle is a British engineer who specialises in aerospace engineering. She currently works for the United Kingdom's Aerospace Technology Institute and is also a professor at the University of Bristol.

== Education ==
Castle studied at the University of Bristol, where she gained an MSc in Aerospace Design.

== Career ==
Castle worked in England for aerospace company, Airbus for around 25 years. She spent part of her time at Airbus as head of landing gear for both the A350 XWB and A380. Castle's most recent position at Airbus as UK Chief Engineer. Her rise up the career ladder at one of the world's leading aerospace companies led to her been awarded many industry awards, including a Top 50 Influential Women in Engineering in the 2016 edition.

Castle's most recent position is Chief Technology Officer at the UK's Aerospace Technology Institute, while also holding an Aegis Professor of Aerospace Technologies professor role at University of Bristol. In 2024, she spoke on a number of occasions about the UK's consortium aiming to develop a functioning hydrogen fuel system for aviation.

== Recognition ==
Castle is a Chartered Engineer and Fellow of the Institution of Mechanical Engineers and the Royal Aeronautical Society. She was elected a Fellow of the Royal Academy of Engineering in 2024.
