= Elizabeth Donnelly (engineer) =

British engineer and executive

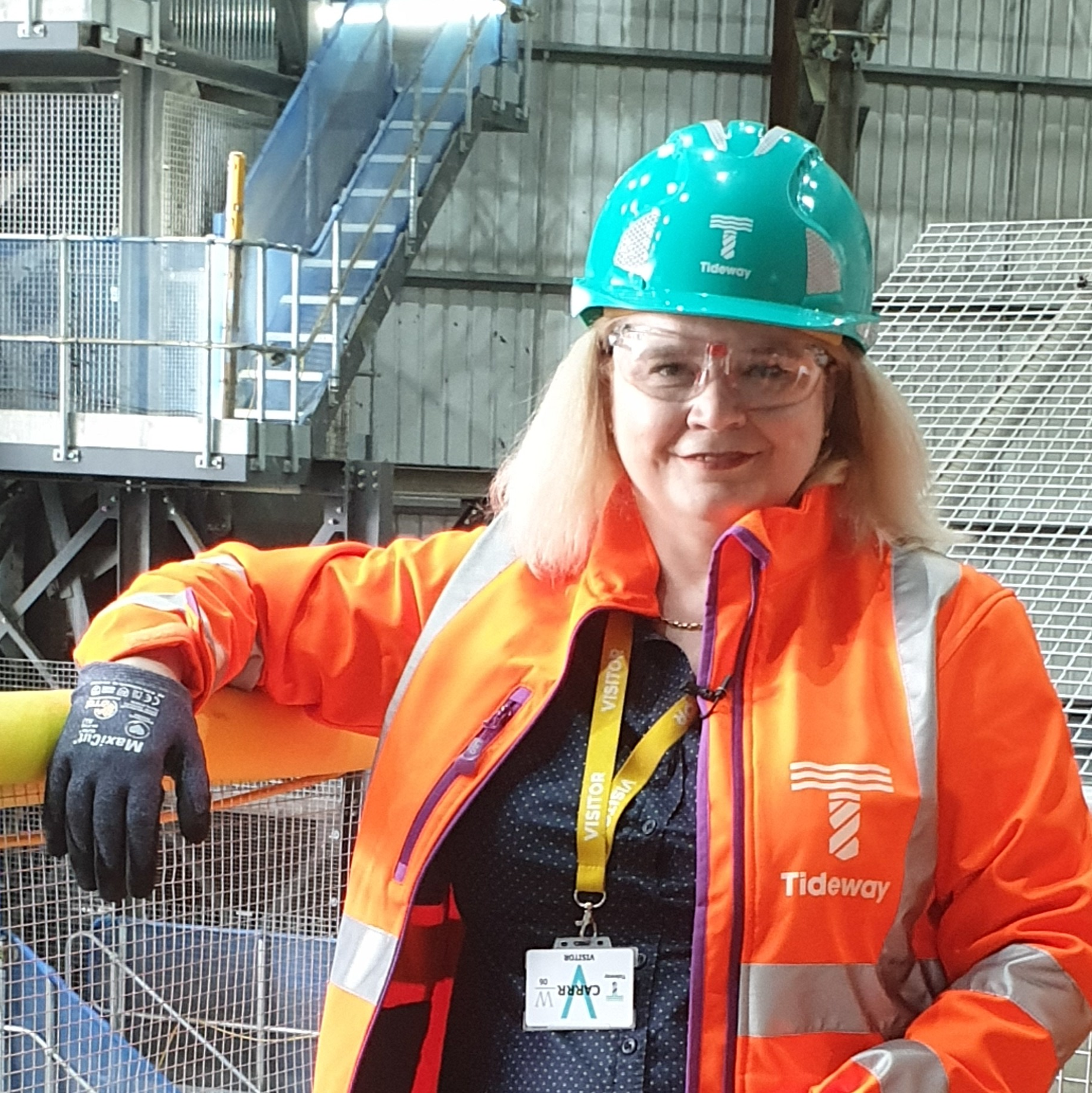
- Elizabeth Donnelly, WES CEO, during the unveiling of a Tunnel Boring Machine named after WES founder Rachel Parsons
- Born: 1968 (age 57–58)
- Education: Open University
- Occupations: Engineer and Executive

Elizabeth Donnelly is a British engineer and executive. She was the chief executive officer of Women's Engineering Society United Kingdom. Donnelly was CEO between 23 August 2018 and December 2024.

A systems engineer by education, Donnelly worked with companies such as Rolls-Royce. She was a founding member of the Royal Aeronautical Society’s (RAeS) Women in Aviation and Aerospace Committee.

== Career ==
Donnelly began her career in Systems Engineering studying Databases and Systems Thinking: Managing Complexity at Open University before she specialized in Systems Thinking and graduated with a Masters in Systems Thinking in Practice. In 2005, she started work with Rolls-Royce as an adviser on lobbying governments to support trade unions. In 2008 Donnelly became a non-executive director of the East Midlands Developments Agency. She worked as Head of Skills to lead skills policy in ADS Group Ltd, the trade organization for aerospace, defence and security in the United Kingdom.

In 2013, Donnelly set up her own company, Pereloquens Ltd. In August 2018, Elizabeth was appointed the chief executive officer of the Women's Engineering Society (WES) to replace Kirsten Bodley.
