= Dawn Childs =

British engineer

Dame Dawn Childs DBE FREng FICE FIMechE FRAeS FWES
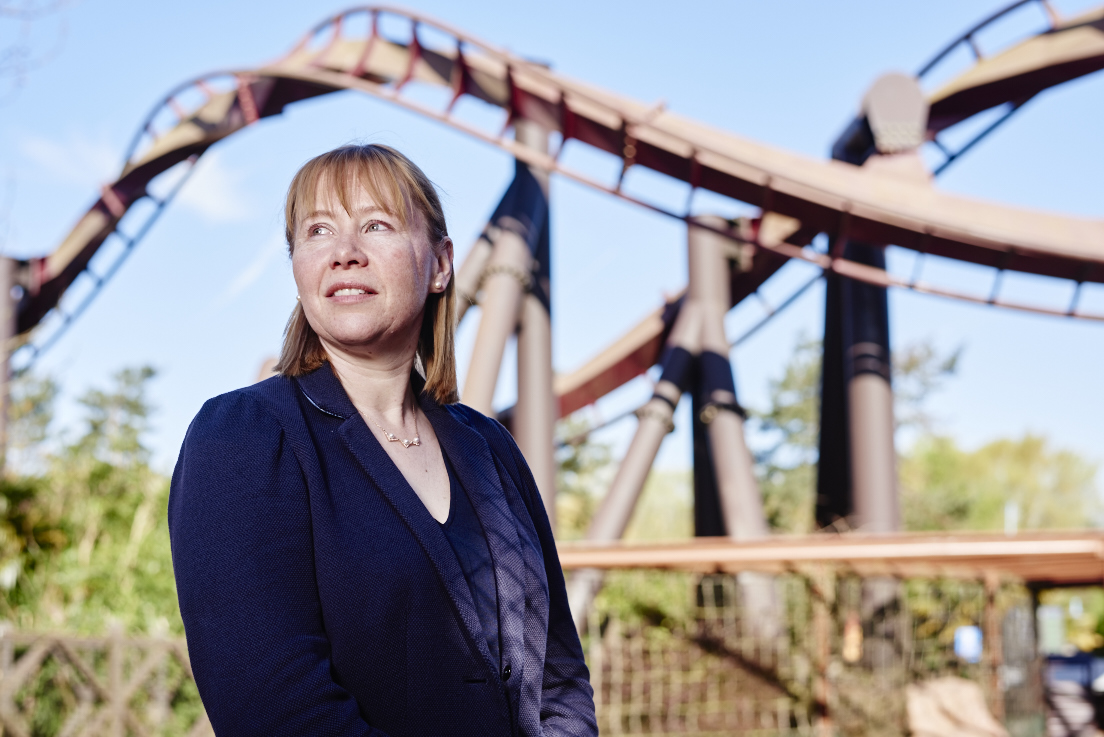
- Childs at Thorpe Park in 2016
- Born: Dawn Elizabeth Elson; 29 November 1970 (age 55)
- Education: Cranfield University; King's College London
- Scientific career
- Fields: Engineer
- Military career
- Branch: Royal Air Force
- Rank: Wing commander

Dame Dawn Elizabeth Childs (née Elson; born 29 November 1970) is a British engineer who has moved between several engineering disciplines including mechanical engineering, aeronautical engineering and civil engineering. She was the first woman engineer in several posts in the Royal Air Force (RAF) and the first female head of engineering at a major international airport. Childs has a track record of developing women within her organisation as well as working to bring more women and girls into the discipline. Childs is currently the chief executive officer of Pure Data Centres Group Ltd, following her role as UK Change Director at National Grid plc.

== Education ==
Childs was educated in Bedgebury Girls School and at the University of Bath where she read mechanical engineering. She continued with higher education on executive courses with a Master of Defence Administration from Cranfield University and a Master of Arts in defence studies from King's College London.

== Career ==
Childs joined the RAF straight from school having been awarded a cadetship as an engineering officer. Whilst reading mechanical engineering at Bath University she was a member of Bristol University Air Squadron before officer training at RAF College Cranwell.

During 23 years of service in the RAF she had numerous postings and was the first female officer to hold many of her appointments. Most notably Childs was the first female Senior Engineering Officer (SEngO) on 216 Squadron and the first female Officer Commanding Engineering Wing (OC Eng Wg) at RAF Waddington where she was responsible for the operational maintenance and logistics of Intelligence, Surveillance, Target Acquisition and Reconnaissance (ISTAR) aircraft based there. Childs left the RAF in 2012 and moved to Gatwick Airport where she was the first female to become the Head of Engineering at a major International airport.

From Gatwick, Childs moved to Merlin Entertainments plc in 2016 and established a new central engineering function covering the governance and standards for the global portfolio of over 120 theme parks and attractions. In 2014 she became an Ambassador for Alton College.

In 2019 Childs departed Merlin Entertainments to take the role of UK Change Director at National Grid. In August 2021 Childs was appointed as the chief executive officer (Operations) at Pure Data Centres Group Ltd and became chief executive officer for the Pure Data Centres Group, a global developer and operator of hyperscale data centres in May 2023. In this role she sits on the Group Board of Directors and has overseen the company’s international expansion, including projects in London, Dublin, Abu Dhabi, Saudi Arabia and Jakarta. Under her leadership, Pure DC has secured planning permission to expand its London campus fourfold, incorporating what has been described as the world’s largest living wall.

== Honours and awards ==
In 1997, Childs was awarded the Barrie Smart Memorial Award for her significant contribution to the RAF community and subsequently gained her pilot's licence. She won the CBI and Real Business First Women Award in Tourism & Leisure in 2013 for being the first female head of engineering at a major International airport. In 2014 she was bestowed with an honorary Doctorate of Science by Staffordshire University in 2014 in recognition of her notable contribution to mechanical and aeronautical engineering in her then-current role at Gatwick and throughout her career with the RAF. It also recognises her dedicated engagement with education by promoting the study of STEM subjects.

Her work to promote STEM subjects and engineering to children and young adults was further recognised in 2015 when she won the Institution of Mechanical Engineers's Alistair Graham-Bryce Award for: "her significant contributions to campaigning for the promotion of engineering to children, students, young adults and particularly women". In 2016, Childs was named as one of the top 50 most influential women engineers in the UK by The Daily Telegraph and Women's Engineering Society.

Childs was a Trustee of World Skills UK from 2015 to September 2023 and became Deputy Chair in 2022.

Childs was the elected President of the Women's Engineering Society, between 2018 and October 2023.

Childs was elected as a Fellow of the Royal Academy of Engineering in September 2020 in recognition of her contributions to the engineering profession and became a Trustee of the academy in September 2023.

She was recognised as the 2022 ‘Inclusion Champion’ for the data centre industry.

She was appointed Dame Commander of the Order of the British Empire (DBE) in the 2023 New Year Honours for services to engineering.

Childs was awarded an Honorary Doctorate of Engineering (DEng) by the University of Bath in 2024, in recognition of her distinguished career as an engineer and operator, her dedication to promoting STEM education for young people across the UK and to addressing the gender imbalance within the world of engineering.

She was awarded Data Centre Dynamics ‘Data Centre Woman of the Year’ in December 2024.
