= Dana Skelley =

British civil engineer

Dana Skelley OBE CCEng
- Born: London, England, UK
- Education: Kingston University; University of Bradford
- Employer: Transport for London Skanska

Danielle Skelley OBE MBA BEng CEng MICE FCIHT, known as Dana, was Managing Director of Grain of Sand Consulting Ltd. Prior to setting up her own consultancy business she was Director of Strategy and Operational Excellence at Skanska. She was a Council Member of the Chartered Institution of Highways and Transportation. She was Director of Asset Management at Transport for London.

She is now retired and living in Dordogne, France.

== Early life and education ==
Skelley was born and raised in London. She studied civil engineering at Kingston University, graduating in 1987. She was the only woman in her class of 150 civil engineers.

== Career ==
Skelley is a Chartered Civil Engineer. She became chartered whilst working on the refurbishment of heritage bridges. She became more interested in the business side of engineering, and completed a Master of Business Administration at the University of Bradford. She was appointed as Head of Consultancy Services at Wandsworth Council in 1989. She joined Transport for London in 2000 as Principal Engineer for the City of London. In 2006 she was promoted to Chief Engineer and became Head of the London-wide Road Network. That year she was named Surveyor and Institution of Civil Engineers Municipals Engineer of the Year. Skelley was made Director of Roads in 2008 and led a team of 500 engineers. At Transport for London, Skelley was responsible for a £4 bn road modernisation plan, which included preparing the capital for the 2012 Summer Olympics, almost all of the Thames crossings and strengthening the Hammersmith flyover. She led a team of 500 engineers. She worked with FM Conway and Arizona Chemical to create environmentally friendly roads for London. She partnered with Costain Group to refurbish the A40 road. Skelley was a judge at the 2012 Institution of Engineering and Technology Young Woman Engineer of the Year award.

Skelley is a champion for making efforts to engage young people with engineering. She was appointed an Officer of the Order of the British Empire in the 2016 New Year Honours, "For services to Transport in the UK". She was included in the inaugural Top 50 Influential Women in Engineering in 2016. In July 2017 Skelley joined Skanska. In 2017 Chartered Institution of Highways and Transportation announced that Skelley had been appointed to the board of trustees. She appeared on their podcast celebrating International Women in Engineering Day. She gave the Worshipful Company of Paviors annual lecture at Imperial College London in 2017.
