= Clan Livingstone =

Highland Scottish clan

- Mac Dhunnshleibhe and Mac an Léigh
- Crest: A demi-man representing the figure of Saint Moluag Proper, his head ensigned of a circle of glory Or, having about his shoulders a cloak Vert, holding in his dexter hand the great Staff of Saint Moluag Proper and in his sinister hand a cross crosslet fitchée Azure.
- Motto: NI MI E MA'S URRAIN DHOMH
- Slogan: CNOC AINGEIL

Profile
- District: Argyll
- Plant badge: Grass of Parnassus

Chief
- The Much Hon. Niall Livingstone of Bachuil
- Baron of the Bachuil By The Grace of God
- Seat: Bachuil, Isle of Lismore

The Clan Livingstone, also known as Clan MacLea, is a Highland Scottish clan, which was traditionally located in the district of Lorn in Argyll, Scotland, and is seated on the Isle of Lismore. There is a tradition of some MacLeas Anglicising their names to Livingstone, thus the Clan Livingstone Society's website also refers to the clan as the Highland Livingstones. The current chief of Clan Livingstone was recognised by Lord Lyon as the "Coarb of Saint Moluag" and the "Hereditable Keeper of the Great Staff of Saint Moluag".

== Origins ==
=== Origin of the names MacLea and Livingstone ===
There are conflicting theories of the etymology of MacLea, MacLay and similar surnames, and they could have multiple origins. The name may be an Anglicisation of Mac an Léigh (Scottish Gaelic), meaning son of the physician. In addition to MacLea, the Gaelic language surname Mac an Léigh is also anglicized to McKinley (surname) and MacNulty. The leading theory today, however, is that the name MacLea was adopted from the patronymic Mac Duinnshleibhe, meaning son of Donn Sléibhe (son of + the brown haired, or chieftain + of the mountain). In 1910 Niall Campbell, 10th Duke of Argyll maintained that the surname MacLea evolved from the name Maconlea, which was originally Mac Dhunnshleibhe. By the eighteenth century the standard form of the name had become MacLea or other forms with similar spellings (MacLeay, McClay, etc.). This is largely a distinction without significance, though, as Mac an Léigh is a nickname surname which was given to the Mac Dhunnshleibhe by the indigenous populations in both Ulster and the Scottish Highlands and which was, eventually, adopted as a substitute surname by the Mac Dhunnshleibhe themselves. The Mac Dhunnshleibhe royals were also one of Ireland's ancient hereditary medical families.

The surname Livingstone/Livingston is derived from the placename, modern Livingston, which is in West Lothian, Scotland. Livingston was in turn named after an individual named Leving who appears in the early twelfth century in the charters of David I of Scotland. This Leving was the progenitor of the powerful aristocratic Livingston family. There are multiple theories of the origin of Leving (Anglo-Saxon, Fleming, Frank, Norman, and even Hungarian).

In the mid seventeenth century James Livingston of Skirling, who was of a branch of these Lowland Livingstons, was granted a nineteen-year lease of the Bishoprics of Argyll and the Isles. Sometime before 1648, James Livingston seems to have stayed at Achanduin Castle on Lismore, and it is thought that around this time that the surname Livingstone would have been adopted by MacLeas on the island.

=== Descent from Dunshleibe ===
The Duke of Argyll wrote that it was possible that the eponymic progenitor of all the Mac(Duns)leves, (MacLeas, highland Livingstones, etc.), of Lismore may be Dunshleibe son of Aedh Alain O'Neill. Aed Alain was the son of the Irish prince Anrothan O'Neill, who traditionally is said to have married a Princess of Dál Riata, inheriting her lands of Cowal and Knapdale. Anrothan in turn was a son of Aodh O'Neill, King of Ailech (r.1030-1033). From him the family would ultimately descend from Niall of the Nine Hostages, High King of Ireland, who reigned in the fifth century, although the O'Neill dynasty actually take their name from his descendant Niall Glúndub, a High King of Ireland living five centuries later. Dunshleibe is also thought to have been the common ancestor of clans in western Argyll including the Lamonts, the MacEwens of Otter, the Maclachlans, the MacNeils of Barra, and the MacSweens.

==== Dunshleibe Ua Eochadha ====
An alternative and the modernly accepted theory, however, is that the MacLea are descended of Ruaidhri Mac Duinnsleibhe, the 54th Christian and last king of Ulidia.

The Coarbs of Saint Moluag are proposed to be closely related to the rigdamnai or Royal Family of Ulster and their use of the name Mac Duinnshleibhe to be a proud reminder and declaration of that fact.

According to Byrne the Ulaid rigdamnai alone used the name Mac Duinnshleibhe

So for instance when after 1137 the Dál Fiatach kingship was confined to the descendants of Donn Sleibe Mac Eochada (slain in 1091), the rigdamnai set themselves apart from the rest of the family by using the name Mac Duinnshleibhe (Donleavy).

— Francis John Byrne, Irish Kings and High-Kings, page 128

It seems as though Ruaidhri Mac Duinnsleibhe was the last king of Ulidia, dying at the end of the twelfth century. Rory, son of Dunsleve, is number 54 on O'Hart's roll of the kings of Ulidia and described as "the last king of Ulidia, and its fifty-fourth king since the advent of St. Patrick to Ireland".

In Irish Pedigrees: The Stem of the Dunlevy Family, Princes of Ulidia, O'Hart says:

Tuirmach Teamrach, the 81st Monarch of Ireland, had a son named Fiach Fearmara, who was ancestor of the Kings of Argyle and Dalriada, in Scotland: this Fiach was also the ancestor of MacDunshleibe and O'Dunsleibhe, anglicised Dunlevy, Dunlief, Dunlop, Levingstone and Livingstone. ...

According to Dr O'Donovan descendants of this family (Cu-Uladh the son the last MacDunshleibe King of Ulidia), soon after the English invasion of Ireland, passed into Scotland, where they changed their name.

== Coarb of Saint Moluag ==
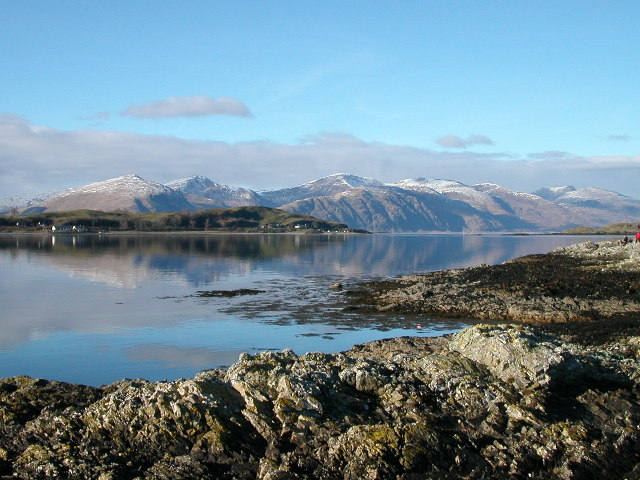
The Isle of Lismore and the hills of Kingairloch beyond

Saint Moluag was a Scottish missionary, and a contemporary of Saint Columba, who evangelised the Picts of Scotland in the sixth century. According to the Irish Annals, in 562 Saint Moluag beat Saint Columba in a race to the large Isle of Lismore. The nineteenth-century historian William F. Skene claimed the Isle of Lismore was the sacred island of the Western Picts and the burial place of their kings whose capital was at Beregonium, across the water at Benderloch.

The Coarb, or successor, of the saint was the hereditary keeper of his pastoral staff. The Great Staff of Saint Moluag, or Bachuil Mor, is thought to be the sixth-century saint's crozier or staff. The Bachuil Mor is a plain wooden staff that is about 38 inches long. There is evidence that the Bachuil Mor was at one time covered with plates of gilt copper of which some remain. On 21 December 1950 on the petition of Livingstone of Bachuil, the Lord Lyon King of Arms ruled that Livingstone was the Coarb of Saint Moluag. Livingstone's ancestor Iain McMolmore Vic Kevir appears in a charter of 1544 as "with keeping of the great staff of the blessed Moloc, as freely as the father, grandfather and great-grandfather and other predecessors of the said Iain".

Since St. Moluag was the founder and head of three schools (Lismore, Rosemarkie and Mortlach) and several subordinate monasteries, he is viewed as a "sovereign lord" by the Lord Lyon. As his successor, the Coarb is the Baron of the Bachuil and is granted a unique chapeau of Gules doubled Vair to place in his coat of arms.

== History ==
Despite claiming ancient heritage the clan was not formally recognised by the Lord Lyon until 2003. The first clan chief of Clan MacLea to be recognised was William Jervis Alastair Livingstone of Bachuil, in 2003. The late chief represented the clan as a member of the Standing Council of Scottish Chiefs. William Jervis Alastair Livingstone of Bachuil died in February 2008 and was succeeded by his son The Much Hon. Niall Livingstone, Baron of Bachuil.

=== Civil War and Jacobite risings ===
During the Scottish Civil War of the 17th century the Livingstones remained loyal to the Crown and as a result their estates suffered, firstly at the hands of the Scottish Covenanters and later at the hands of Oliver Cromwell's Parliamentarians.

During the 18th century the Clan Livingstone supported the Jacobite rising of 1715 and as a result their titles were forfeited. The MacLeas (later referred to as Livingstones) fought in the Appin Regiment at the Battle of Culloden in 1746. Donald Livingstone, Bun-a-mhuilinn, Morvern, was of the Livingstones of Achnacree, Benderloch and was 18 when he fought at Culloden saving the Appin Standard.

=== Clan battles ===
Battle of Bealach na Broige
This battle was fought between various north-western highland clans from the lands of Ross, against the Earl of Ross and his followers. Though the date of the battle is obscure, what is known is that the rising consisted of the "Clan-juer" (Clan Iver), "Clantalvigh" (Clan-t-aluigh, i.e. Clan Aulay), and "Clan-leajwe" (Clan-leaive, i.e. Clan Leay). The Munroes and Dingwalls pursued and overtook the rising clans at Bealach na Broige, where a bitter battle ensued, fed by old feuds and animosities. In the end, the MacIvers, MacAulays and MacLeays were almost utterly extinguished and the Munroes and Dingwalls won a hollow victory, having lost many men including their chiefs.
Achnacree. 1557
The McLeays of Achnacree were almost wiped out, losing 80 men supporting the MacDougalls of Lorn against the Clan Campbell of Inverawe in a clan battle. McLea Manuscript, Highland Papers, Vol. IV, 1296 to 1752, third Series, Scottish History Society, pp 94 to 103.
Dunaverty. 1647
Many of the clan MacLea seem to have been killed when they took the side of the Clan MacDougall against the Campbells of Inverawe, a conflict exemplified by the Dunaverty Massacre. Placed prominently at the top of the second column of a list of those massacred at Dunaverty, 1647, supporting the MacDougalls were these McLeas: Iain Mc Iain Vc ein dui alias Mc onlea, Dunsla M'ein Vc onlea and Iain M'onlea, his brother, (Highland Papers, II, p. 257).

== Clan profile ==
=== Crest badge, clan badge and clan chief ===
- Crest badge: (Note: the crest badge is made up of the chief's heraldic crest and motto.)
  - Chief's crest: A demi-man representing the figure of Saint Moluag Proper, his head ensigned of a circle of glory Or, having about his shoulders a cloak Vert, holding in his dexter hand the great Staff of Saint Moluag Proper and in his sinister hand a cross crosslet fitchée Azure, and in an Escrol over the same this Motto CNOC AINGEIL.
  - Chief's motto (slogan): CNOC AINGEIL (translation from Scottish Gaelic: "Hill of fire"). Note: this motto or slogan is derived from a Pictish burial mound behind the chief's house at Bachuil.
  - Chief's motto (alternative, not used in crest badge): NI MI E MA'S URRAIN DHOMH (translation from Scottish Gaelic: "I shall do it if I can"). This motto is said to be a play on words of the unrelated Livingston's heraldic motto: Si Je Puis (French: "If I can").
- Clan badge: The Flower of the Grass of Parnassus.
- Clan chief: The Much Hon. Niall Livingstone of Bachuil, Baron of Bachuil By The Grace of God, Coarb of St Moluag, Abbot of Lismore

== Tartans ==
Tartan image	Notes
	Modern Livingstone tartan. Livingstone Sett, or Livingstone. Although the Livingstones or MacLeas are associated with the Buchanans, MacDougalls and the Stewarts of Appin, the tartan sett does not resemble that of any of these clans. The tartan most closely resembles the MacDonell of Keppoch tartan.
	Livingston Dress tartan. Livingstone Dress, also known as Livingston Dress.
	Livingstone or MacLay tartan. Livingstone / MacLay. This tartan is based upon the MacLaine of Lochbuie tartan which dates before 1810. The Maclaine of Lochbuie tartan dates before 1810 and was first published in 1886.

== See also ==
- Maclay (disambiguation)
