= Kerrine Bryan =

Engineer and author

Kerrine Bryan is an engineer and author from the United Kingdom. She is the founder of Butterfly Books and currently lives in New York with her husband and two daughters. Bryan is a volunteer mentor for the IET and a STEM Ambassador, with a passion for educating youngsters on careers for women in STEM.

== Early life and background ==
Bryan is a third generation Jamaican. Bryan's grandparents moved to England in the 1950s as part of the Windrush Generation. Bryan was brought up in Birmingham, England. Bryan said: "Being one of very few black children in my school, my mother always told me that I would need to work twice as hard to get half the success of my friends. This thought has been with me throughout my entire life, and has pushed me to always give a little bit extra at school and at work, and to be the best I can be."

== Education and early career ==
Bryan landed into engineering by accident. Bryan was advised by teachers that accountancy was the best job for a woman who was adept at maths. During her A-levels, Bryan's maths teacher suggested she consider Engineering. He encouraged her to apply for the engineering residential at Glamorgan University (Headstart Scheme), which is now run by the Engineering Trust. After a year of experience in the industry, she decided to pursue a degree in Engineering. Bryan graduated from the University of Birmingham in 2005 after a 4-year master's degree in Electronic Engineering with German. Bryan then directly secured a place on a graduate scheme at a large oil and gas contractor.

== Advocacy for gender equality in STEM and publishing career ==
Bryan decided to volunteer doing talks about her job across the country to children. It was then that she got the idea to develop a range of children's books that could tackle some of the misconceptions about the profession, which she argues begin from a very early age.

"Picture books and rhyme are a brilliant way of communicating to children a positive message about all kinds of professions, especially STEM careers that are suffering skill gaps and diversity issues," said Bryan. "It’s important both children and parents understand that these jobs are available and accessible to them – no matter what gender they are or what background they come from – and that the opportunity is there for the taking if they apply themselves, work hard and want it enough. The world is their oyster." Bryan became a mother to a little girl in 2016. Bryan then founded Butterfly Books with her brother Jason Bryan. The aim of these books were to create stories that will be a helpful teaching resource enabling children to see the opportunities available to them and eventually help close skills gaps and reduce gender bias in professions. Bryan has published five books as of 2019 under Butterfly Books, these include, My Mummy is an Engineer, My Mummy is a Plumber (2015), My Mummy is a Scientist (2016), My Mummy is a Farmer (2018) and her most recent My Mummy is a Soldier (2019).

== Personal life ==
Kerrine lives in New York with her husband and two daughters. She is a current fellow of the Institution of Engineering and Technology

== Awards ==
In 2014 Bryan was listed by Management Today Magazine and The Sunday Times as one of the UK's top 35 women in business under the age of 35, which highlighted her work as a lead engineer for a large North Sea Offshore oil platform project. Bryan is the 2015 PRECIOUS Award winner for outstanding woman in STEM. In 2016 Bryan was listed We are the City Rising Star Award Winner. In 2017 Bryan was listed by The Telegraph under the Top 50 Influential Women in Engineering.

Bryan has won multiple awards as an author. In 2015 in The Wishing Shelf Book Awards Bryan won a Bronze Medal in the category "Pre-school picture books" for My Mummy is an Engineer. In 2016 Shelf Unbound Notable 100 Winner (My Mummy is an Engineer). Bryan was also listed in the 2017 Purdue University Engineering Gift Guide for My Mummy is an Engineer.
