= Luiza C. Campos =

Brazilian British engineer

Professor Luiza C. Campos
- Employer: University College London
- Known for: Gold Medal by the Institution of Civil Engineers for outstanding contributions to engineering excellence (2023) Top 50 Women in Engineering by the Women's Engineering Society (2024)
- Website: https://profiles.ucl.ac.uk/3882-luiza-c-campos

Luiza C. Campos is an engineer and Professor of Environmental Engineering at the Department of Civil, Environmental & Geomatic Engineering in the Faculty of Engineering Sciences at University College London.

She is known for her work in the fields of water and sanitation, water management technologies, environmental engineering and engineering for international development.

She won the Institution of Civil Engineers Gold Medal Award in 2023 and has been Chair of the Sanitation and Water Management in Developing Countries Specialist Group for the International Water Association since 2022.

She was interviewed by New Scientist in August 2023.

== Biography ==
She gained her Bachelor of Engineering from the Catholic University of Goias in 1989, Master of Science from the University of Sao Paulo in 1992 and her Doctor of Philosophy degree from Imperial College in 2002.

Prior to joining UCL in 2007, she was Postgraduate Programme Director for Environmental Engineering and Assistant Professor at the Federal University of Goias Department of Civil Engineering.

Before beginning her academic career, Campos worked for 10 years at a state water and wastewater company in Brazil on the operation and maintenance of large urban water systems and community water treatment optimisation programmes. She was a member of the Board of Councillors of the Regional Chamber of Engineers, Architects and Agriculture of the State of Goiás, Brazil (1995-1997, 2005-2006) and the Board of Directors of the Brazilian Environmental Engineering Association, State of Goiás, Brazil (1993-1997, 2005-2006).

== Recognition ==
- Associate Editor, Water Journal (MDPI)

- Editorial Board Member, Journal of Water Process Engineering (Elsevier)

- Editorial Board Member, UCL Open: Environment

- Fellow of the Institution of Civil Engineers (FICE)

- Fellow of the Royal Society of Chemistry (FRSC)

- Editorial Board Member, Municipal Engineer (ICE)

- Head of the Water Management Research Group at University College London

- Co-Director of the Centre for Urban Sustainability and Resilience at University College London

- Chair of Sanitation and Water Management in Developing Countries Specialist Group for the International Water Association since 2022.

== Awards ==
- Winner of the Institution of Civil Engineers Gold Medal Award in 2023

- Named as one of the Top 50 Influential Women in Engineering in 2024.

== Publications ==
See her full list of academic publications here.

Her H-Index is 24 as of 2023.
