= Faye Banks =

British engineer

Faye Banks is a British engineer, visiting Professor at the Royal Academy of Engineering, former apprentice of Wakefield College, an Open University alumna and a Sheffield Hallam University Doctor of Business Administration graduate.

Banks won the UK Young Woman of the Year in 2004, National Higher Educational Gold Award in 2005, became the youngest fellow of the Institute of Engineering and Technology's (IET) in 2015 and was featured in the Telegraph's Top 50 UK Female Engineers in 2016.

== Early life and education ==
Banks grew up in Barnsley (England) in a family of four girls and after a turbulent childhood was taken into care in aged nine, spending five years living in children's homes and with several different foster families.

After leaving school at 16 with no formal qualifications, Banks started living in their own council flat and claiming for job seekers allowance before securing a low skilled manual job in a manufacturing plant packing meat into containers.

Tired and frustrated due to her limited career options, Banks had a lightbulb moment when she observed an engineer fixing the faults on a machine that broke down resulting in production being completely stopped. Inspired by this episode, Banks decided to become an engineer but due to her lack of formal qualifications she had to return to education and eventually gained 10 As at GCSE the following year. This allowed her to start an advanced apprenticeship in Electrical Engineering in the manufacturing sector at Wakefield College.

Banks is an Open University alumna where she studied for a BSc in Engineering, MBA, MSc and MEng and a Sheffield Hallam University Doctor of Business Administration graduate.

== Career ==
Banks gained asset management, operational and commercial experience throughout the water, electrical transmission and distribution sectors leading major capital projects including extra-high voltage substation design and build contracts.

As a Technical Consultant for the Department of Business, Energy and Industrial Strategy, Banks undertook review of the UK engineering standards, work that led to future governmental policies being set.

Banks has more than 30 years' experience in the energy sector. She has worked as Head of Customer Services in Digital Grid at Siemens, Director of Energy & Asset Management at Vital Energi Utilities Limited, and as a Senior Consultant and Delivery Lead at Enzen Global Limited. She has also held the positions of Director of Electrical Transmission & Distribution at Turner & Townsend and North-East Electrical Transmission and Asset Manager at National Grid. Banks has contributed to the Royal Academy of Engineering and to The Open University's Industrial Advisory Board.

Additionally, Banks represented the UK Energy Policy Committee with the Institute of Engineering and Technology and was elected onto the Institute of Engineering and Technology's UK Communities Together Project team as well as the National Apprenticeship Working Group.

=== Awards and honours ===
- 2004 UK Young Woman of the Year
- 2005 National Higher Educational Gold Award
- 2015 Institute of Engineering and Technology's (IET) Youngest Fellow
- 2016 Telegraph's Top 50 UK Female Engineers feature
