= Isobel Pollock-Hulf =

British academic

- Born: Isobel Anne Pollock; 10 November 1954 (age 71); Ballymoney, Northern Ireland
- Spouses: Graham Ramsden (m. 1980; died 1997); Robin Hulf (m. 2015; died 2015)
- Awards: OBE; FIMechE; FCGI

Academic background
- Education: Imperial College, London

Academic work
- Discipline: Engineering management

Isobel Anne Pollock-Hulf (born 10 November 1954) is visiting professor in Engineering and Design at the University of Leeds.

== Early life ==
Pollock is the daughter of Wilson and Margaret Pollock, she was educated at Dalriada School, Ballymoney, Northern Ireland and then attended Imperial College in London graduating in 1976. Subsequently, she became a Chartered Engineer (CEng) in 1981.

== Industrial career ==
Pollock worked for ICI in Huddersfield for 10 years before moving to Leeds company DuPont Howson and then Rotherham company Beatson Clark

== Professional career ==
A long time member of the Institution of Mechanical Engineers Pollock has held several roles within the institute and was elected as a Fellow of the Institution (FIMechE) in 1991 before becoming President of the Institution in 2012–2013. Pollock was chair of the Institution's Heritage Committee when it was founded in 2007 and was responsible for relaunching the Engineering Heritage Awards.

Since 2006 Pollock has been the Royal Academy of Engineering Visiting professor in Engineering and Design at the University of Leeds.

Pollock has been a member of the Science and Technology Advisory Council which provides independent strategic advice, challenge and support to the National Physical Laboratory since 2015.

Pollock is a patron of the Women's Engineering Society and was Master of the Worshipful Company of Engineers for 2016–17

== Recognition ==
For services to mechanical engineering Pollock was appointed an Officer of the Order of the British Empire in the 2014 Queen's Birthday Honours.

As well as being a Fellow of the Institution of Mechanical Engineers, Pollock is also a Fellow of City and Guilds of London Institute (FCGI) and has been a Freeman of the City of London since 2002.

Pollock has been awarded Honorary doctorates from the University of Huddersfield in 2004 and the University of Leeds in 2016. She was awarded the Sir Harold Hartley medal by the Institute of Measurement and Control in 2013. Pollock was awarded Honorary Fellowship of the Institution of Engineering and Technology in 2016.
