= David McLay =

Scottish footballer

Personal information
- Full name: David Shanks McLay
- Date of birth: 18 May 1898
- Place of birth: Gorbals, Scotland
- Position: Goalkeeper

Senior career*
Years	Team	Apps	(Gls)
1915–1923	Queen's Park	12	(0)
- * Club domestic league appearances and goals

David Shanks McLay was a Scottish amateur footballer who played as goalkeeper for Queen's Park in the Scottish League and served as a corporal for the Gordon Highlanders in the First World War.

== Career statistics ==
Appearances and goals by club, season and competition
Club	Season	League			Scottish Cup		Other		Total	
Club	Season	Division	Apps	Goals	Apps	Goals	Apps	Goals	Apps	Goals
Queen's Park	1915–16	Scottish First Division	1	0	—		0	0	1	0
Queen's Park	1920–21	Scottish First Division	3	0	0	0	1 (Note: Appearance in Glasgow Merchants Charity Cup)	0	4	0
Queen's Park	1921–22	Scottish First Division	7	0	0	0	1 (Note: Appearance in Glasgow Cup)	0	8	0
Queen's Park	1922–23	Scottish First Division	1	0	0	0	0	0	1	0
Career total			12	0	0	0	2	0	14	0
