= Dawn Bonfield =

Engineer, engineering advocate and educator

Dawn Bonfield MBE FREng FICE FIStructE FIMMM FWES
- Born
- Occupation: Materials engineer

Dawn Bonfield is a materials engineer and founder and director of Towards Vision, a company which aims to work towards a vision of diversity and inclusion in engineering. She is past president and former chief executive of the Women's Engineering Society (WES), and in 2018 was an ambassador for the Year of Engineering, promoting engineering careers through a roadshow aimed at meeting parents.

== Career ==
A materials engineer by profession, training and experience - having studied materials science at Bath University - Bonfield has worked at AERE Harwell, Citroen Research Centre (Paris), British Aerospace (Bristol), MBDA (Stevenage), and the Institute of Materials, Minerals and Mining (London).

In 2017, Bonfield was appointed a Visiting Professor of Inclusive Engineers at Aston University, developing undergraduate content on inclusive engineering to equip the next generation of engineers with the skills and competencies they need to be inclusive. She also co-founded IncEng in 2017, a platform to bring together under-represented groups in engineering.

== Activism ==
Bonfield joined the council of the Women's Engineering Society in 2011 and was elected president in 2014. She then became CEO in 2015. Bonfield was the founder of National Women in Engineering Day in 2014 and in 2015 established the inaugural 50 Women in Engineering List with the Daily Telegraph. She established and still runs the "Magnificent Women" schools outreach project and website, and the Sparxx project to support STEM (science, technology, engineering and mathematics) students. She is a STEM ambassador who regularly promotes engineering and materials in schools.

== Awards ==
In 2015 Bonfield won a WISE Award and an Association Congress Award for the INWED campaign, and in 2016 she won the SEMTA Skills Diversity Award. In 2016 she was a Finalist in the Airbus GEDC Diversity Award, and in 2017 she won the Women's Business Council STEM 'Starting Out' award.

She was made MBE in the 2016 Queen's Birthday Honours list for 'Services to the promotion of diversity in engineering'.

== Membership of groups ==
Bonfield has been a member of the following groups:

- T Level panel member: Design, Development and Control
- Member of the Department of Education Technical Education Inclusivity Working Group
- Member of the Royal Academy of Engineering Diversity and Inclusion Leadership Group on Measurement
- Member of Bath University Court
- Patron at Alton Convent School, Hampshire
- External Athena Swan Advisory Group Member, City University
- Member of the Royal Academy of Engineering Visiting Professors' Management Group
- Member of the Women’s Business Council STEM Starting Out Subgroup
- Member of Women in Materials Committee of Institute of Materials, Minerals & Mining
