= Andy McClay =

Scottish footballer

Personal information
- Full name: Andrew McClay
- Date of birth: 26 November 1972 (age 53)
- Place of birth: Glasgow, Scotland
- Position: Midfielder

Team information
- Current team: Rutherglen Glencairn

Senior career*
Years	Team	Apps	(Gls)
1998–2002	Clyde	67	(3)
- * Club domestic league appearances and goals

Andrew McClay (born 26 November 1972) is a Scottish footballer who plays for Rutherglen Glencairn.

== Career ==
McClay began his career with junior side Maryhill. He spent six seasons at Lochburn Park. In the summer of 1998, he was part of the Junior revolution which swept through Clyde, being one of eleven players coming from the junior ranks to join the Bully Wee. He was captain of the team which won the Scottish Second Division championship in 2000. McClay was a fans favourite at Clyde, but he was very injury prone, playing only 18 games in his final three seasons with the club.

McClay left Clyde in January 2003, and returned to former club Maryhill, before joining Pollok. By 2015, McClay had reached five Scottish Junior Cup semi finals, and lost on each occasion.

McClay was selected for the Scotland Junior team as well.

== Honours ==
Clyde

- Scottish Second Division: 1999–2000
