= Baron of the Bachuil =

Title of nobility in the Baronage of Scotland

Barony of the Bachuil
- Arms of Livingstone, Barons of the Bachuil: Quarterly, First Or, a lion rampant Gules, Second and Third Argent, a dexter hand couped at the wrist Gules, holding a cross crosslet fitchée Azure, Fourth Or, in chief a salmon naiant Proper, in base three bars wavy Azure
- Creation date: 9th century
- Creation: Baronage of Scotland
- Present holder: The Much Hon. Niall Livingstone of Bachuil, Baron of Bachuil 'By The Grace of God', Coarb of St Moluag, Abbot of Lismore, Head of Clan Livingstone
- Heir presumptive: Catriona, The Maid of Bachuil
- Seat: Bachuil House

Styles of The Baron of Bachuil
- Reference style: The Baron
- Spoken style: Baron

Baron of the Bachuil is a title of nobility in the Baronage of Scotland. It is regarded as the oldest aristocratic title in the country and ecclesiastical (church) office, predating even the Archbishop of Canterbury, with origins tracing back to Saint Moluag, a Celtic saint who established 120 monasteries.

== Brief history ==
Isle of Lismore is a small island located in the Firth of Lorn, off the west coast of Scotland. It lies within the district of Lorne and the historic sheriffdom of Argyll, opposite the town of Oban. The island is approximately 10 miles long and 1 mile wide on average. Geologically, Lismore is characterised by a limestone formation, with some whin and trap dykes traversing the island. An ancient sea-margin surrounds much of the island, extending up to 100 yards wide in places.

In the early medieval period, Saint Moluag is said to have founded a monastery on Lismore. When the medieval Diocese of Argyll was established, Lismore was selected as the seat of the new bishopric, and a cathedral on the island was chosen as the seat.

The Livingstones of Bachuil were appointed as hereditary custodians of the bishop's pastoral staff (bachuill), granting them the title of "Baron of the Bachuil". This family played a prominent role in the island's history for centuries. In the 16th century, Sir Donald Campbell of Airds falsely accused the Livingstones of stealing a sheep and seized their lands south of Fuaran Frangaig.

On his deathbed, Sir Donald is said to have repeatedly called for the Baron of the Bachuil, but his wife prevented the Baron from coming to him. The Livingstones also had a long-standing association with the Stewarts of Appin. They risked their lives to recover the body of their friend, a Stewart of Appin, after he was killed by the Macleans of Duart.

The famous explorer and missionary Dr David Livingstone was a descendant of the Livingstones of Bachuil on Lismore. The gravestone of the Barons of the Bachuil can still be seen in the old burial ground of Lismore Cathedral, next to the site of the original medieval church. The earliest known charter granting lands and custody of the bishop's staff to the Barons of the Bachuil dates to 1544, though it refers to an even earlier charter establishing their position.

== Arms ==
Coat of arms of Baron of the Bachuil
Crest A demi-man representing the figure of Saint Moluag Proper, his head ensigned of a circle of glory Or, having about his shoulders a cloak Vert, holding in his dexter hand the great Staff of Saint Moluag Proper and in his sinister hand a cross crosslet fitchée Azure Helm A helm befitting his degree (baron) Escutcheon Quarterly, First Or, a lion rampant Gules, Second and Third Argent, a dexter hand couped at the wrist Gules, holding a cross crosslet fitchée Azure, Fourth Or, in chief a salmon naiant Proper, in base three bars wavy Azure Supporters On either side a bulk Proper each gorged with a chain pendant therefrom a portcullis Or. Motto NI MI E MA'S URRAIN DHOMH' (Scottish Gaelic for 'I shall do it if I can') Other elements Behind the Shield are placed in saltire two Bachuils within their cases Or, jewelled Gules behind which is draped his baronial mantle Gules doubled of silk Argent, fur-edged of miniver and collar Ermine and fastened on the right shoulder by five spherical buttons Or; above the Shield is placed a chapeau Gules furred Vair (in respect of the Barony of the Bachuil the tenure of which is analogous to "par le grâce de Dieu") (Note: The chapeau gules furred vair is a unique privilliage of the Baron of the Bachuil. No other baron is entitled to such a hat.) Slogan CNOC AINGEIL (Scottish Gaelic for 'Hill of fire')

== See also ==
- Clan Livingstone
