= Louise Kingham =

Louise Kingham CBE FEI
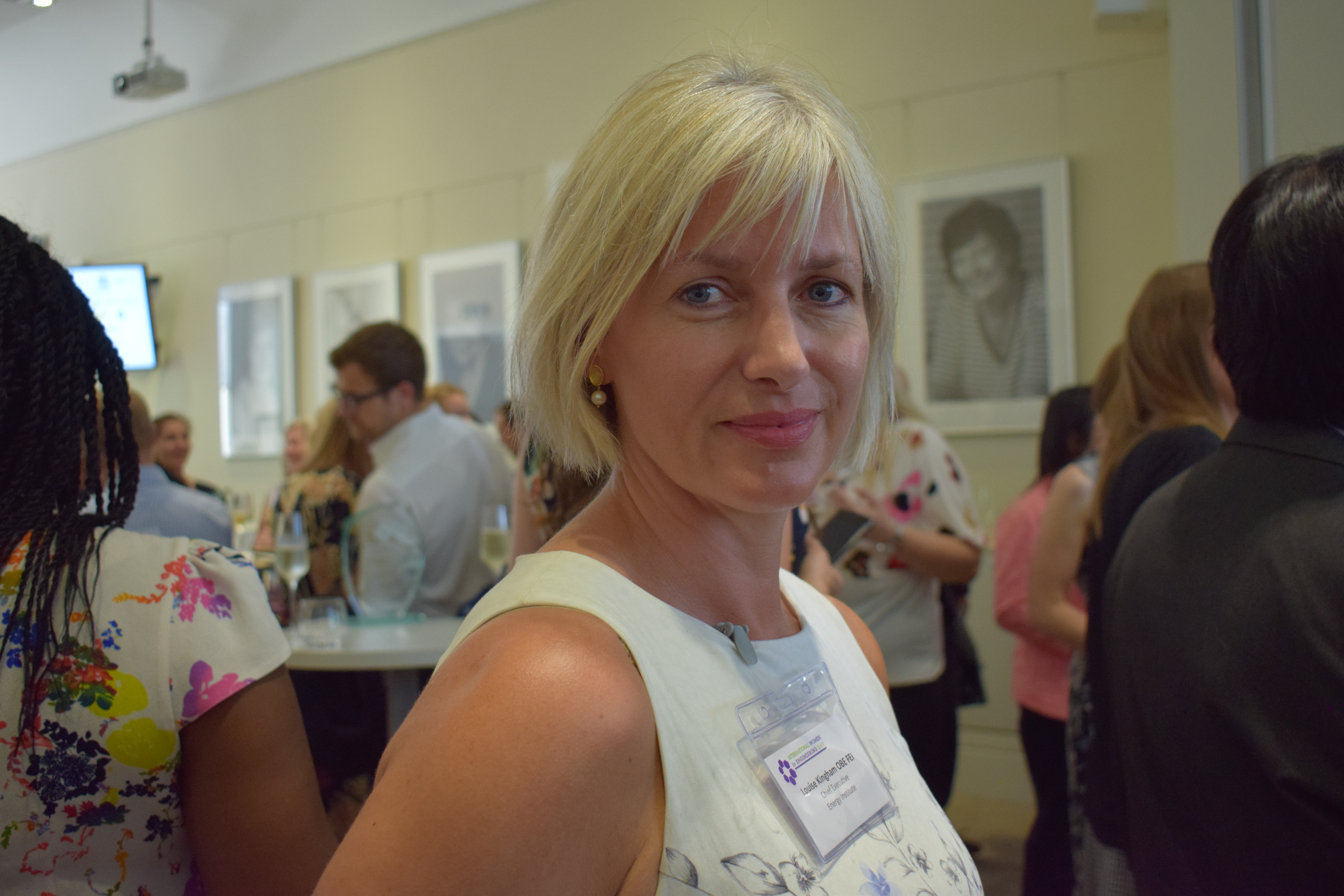
- Education: University of London
- Employer: Energy Institute, BP

Louise Anne Kingham, CBE is the senior vice president, Europe and head of country at bp. She was awarded an honorary doctorate of science from the University of Bath in 2017. She was previously the chief executive at the Energy Institute from 2003 to 2021.

== Early life and education ==
Kingham as born and educated in Surrey. She completed undergraduate and postgraduate studies at the University of London.

== Career ==
Kingham worked for Guinness Brewery and Thompson Publishing Group. From 1999 to 2002 she worked at the Institute of Energy. Kingham served as Director General of the Institute of Petroleum from 2002. She was appointed chief executive at the Energy Institute in 2003. In 2003 the Energy Institute was incorporated by the Royal charter, and now works with 120 countries worldwide. She was won the Global Leadership in Energy Award in 2006. She is a board member of the POWERful Women initiative. In 2009 Kingham was appointed Deputy Chair of the UK Engineering Technology Board's Professional Panel.

She was appointed Officer of the Order of the British Empire (OBE) in the 2011 Birthday Honours for services to energy and Commander of the Order of the British Empire (CBE) in the 2022 New Year Honours for services to the energy industry.

She has acted as President of the Energy Industries Club. She is interested in the future of energy supply and finding sustainable ways to combat climate change.
