= First Women =

The First Women awards programme was created by Real business 2005 in United Kingdom.

First Women was supported by the Confederation of British Industry. Henrietta Jowitt, Deputy Director-General, Commercial at the CBI gave the keynote speech at the 2016 First Woman Awards.

The First Women Young Achiever Award was celebrated by Emma Hagan, chief risk officer at Silicon Valley Bank, aged 24, and Amanda White, who headed up the HS3 rail project.

Jan Flawn CBE was the first Woman of business services who launched her business at the age of 50 after raising her children, uses her First Women platform to advocate for women across the country.

== Charity ==
First Women has partnered with Keep a Girl in School Project to create awareness and help towards promoting education for girls in Uganda and The Washroom Project to raise funds that will support the education of at least 500 girls.

== See also ==
- List of women's firsts
