= Cathy McClay =

British engineer

Catherine Isabel McClay
- Education: Imperial College London; University of Cambridge
- Scientific career
- Workplaces: Sembcorp; National Grid; EDF Energy; Edison Mission Energy
- Thesis: Efficiency Improvement of Cage Induction Motors. (1996)

Catherine Isabel McClay is a British engineer who is the Head of Futures at the National Grid. She is focussed on the energy transition and decarbonisation. She was elected Fellow of the Royal Academy of Engineering in 2019 and appointed Order of the British Empire in 2021.

== Early life and education ==
McClay grew up in Northern Ireland and went to Limavady_Grammar_School. She applied to study electrical engineering after a recommendation from her teacher, and eventually attended Imperial College London. In 1990, she was appointed President of the City and Guilds College Union, the first woman to hold such a responsibility. She was a doctoral researcher at the University of Cambridge, where she studied ways to improve the efficiency of cage induction motors. After graduating, McClay returned to Imperial College London, where she worked as lecturer.

== Research and career ==
McClay started a career in industry in 1999. She first joined Edison Mission Energy, where she worked on business modelling and strategy. In 2006 she moved to British Energy. She joined EDF Energy in 2009. At EDF, McClay was responsible for portfolio management. In 2015 McClay was appointed Head of Commercial at National Grid.

McClay worked on systems operation at the National Grid. In particular, McClay works on future markets and the transition to zero carbon. She was interested in demand side response (DSR), which provides electricity to people as and when they need it. She believes this approach can provide power at times it is more abundant and clean. McClay was elected a Fellow of the Royal Academy of Engineering in 2019.

In 2019, McClay moved to Sembcorp as Optimisation Director, where she focussed on flexible asset operation in the British market.

== Awards and honours ==
- 2016: Top 50 Influential Women in Engineering
- 2019: Fellow of the Royal Academy of Engineering
- 2022: Order of the British Empire
