= Science, Technology, Engineering and Mathematics Network =

UK educational charity

The Science, Technology, Engineering and Mathematics Network (STEMNET) is an educational charity in the United Kingdom that seeks to encourage participation at school and college in science and engineering-related subjects (science, technology, engineering, and mathematics) and (eventually) work.

== History ==
It is based at Woolgate Exchange near Moorgate tube station in London and was established in 1996. The chief executive is Kirsten Bodley. The STEMNET offices are housed within the Engineering Council.

== Function ==
Its chief aim is to interest children in science, technology, engineering and mathematics. Primary school children can start to have an interest in these subjects, leading secondary school pupils to choose science A levels, which will lead to a science career. It supports the After School Science and Engineering Clubs at schools. There are also nine regional Science Learning Centres.

== STEM ambassadors ==
To promote STEM subjects and encourage young people to take up jobs in these areas, STEMNET have around 30,000 ambassadors across the UK. these come from a wide selection of the STEM industries and include TV personalities like Rob Bell.

== Funding ==
STEMNET used to receive funding from the Department for Education and Skills. Since June 2007, it receives funding from the Department for Children, Schools and Families and Department for Innovation, Universities and Skills, since STEMNET sits on the chronological dividing point (age 16) of both of the new departments.

== See also ==
- The WISE Campaign
- Engineering and Physical Sciences Research Council
- National Centre for Excellence in Teaching Mathematics
- Association for Science Education
- Glossary of areas of mathematics
- Glossary of astronomy
- Glossary of biology
- Glossary of chemistry
- Glossary of engineering
- Glossary of physics
