= Physiological Society Annual Review Prize Lecture =

Learned society award lecture

Annual Review Prize Lecture
- Sponsored by: The Physiological Society
- Location: London
- Presented by: The Physiological Society
- Website: www.physoc.org/supporting-you/prize-lectures/annual-review-prize-lecture/

The Physiology Society Annual Review Prize Lecture is an award conferred by The Physiological Society. First awarded in 1968, it is one of the premier awards of the society.

== Recipients ==
Recipients of the prize, and their lectures, have included:

- 1968: William D.M. Paton
- 1969: Geoffrey Harris (neuroendocrinologist)
- 1970: W. A. H. Rushton – Pigments and signals in colour vision
- 1971: Henry Barcroft – An enquiry into the nature of the mediator of the vasodilatation in skeletal muscle in exercise and during circulatory arrest
- 1972: John Eccles – The cerebellum as a computer: patterns in space and time
- 1973: Andrew F. Huxley – Muscular contraction
- 1974: A. A. Harper
- 1975: Hugh Davson – The blood–brain barrier
- 1976: Alan Lloyd Hodgkin – Chance and design in electrophysiology: an informal account of certain experiments on nerve carried out between 1934 and 1952
- 1977: Raymond Michael Gaze
- 1978: K. W. Cross – La Chaleur Animale and the infant brain (lecture delivered 1979)
- 1979: Geoffrey Burnstock – Neurotransmitters and trophic factors in the autonomic nervous system
- 1980: Peter Matthews (physiologist) – Evolving views on the internal operation and functional role of the muscle spindle
- 1981: H. H. Loeschke – Central chemosensitivity and the reaction theory (Loeschche was unable to deliver his lecture owing to ill-health, but it was published)
- 1982: Geoffrey S. Dawes – The central control of fetal breathing and skeletal muscle movements
- 1983: Denis Noble – The surprising heart: a review of recent progress in cardiac electrophysiology
- 1984: Roger C. Thomas – Experimental displacement of intracellular pH and the mechanism of its subsequent recovery
- 1985: Daniel J. C. Cunningham – Studies on arterial chemoreceptors in man
- 1986: David M. Armstrong – The supraspinal control of mammalian locomotion
- 1987: Christopher C. Michel – Capillary permeability and how it may change
- 1988: Pierre Dejours – From comparative physiology of respiration to several problems of environmental adaptations and to evolution
- 1989: J. V. G. A. Durnin
- 1990: Olga Hudlická – What makes blood vessels grow?
- 1991: Ole H. Petersen – Stimulus-secretion coupling: cytoplasmic calcium signals and the control of ion channels in exocrine acinar cells
- 1992: Ian M. Glynn – All hands to the sodium pump
- 1993: Kenneth M. Spyer – Central nervous mechanisms contributing to cardiovascular control
- 1994: C. B. Wollheim
- 1995: Colin Blakemore
- 1996: Michael J. Berridge – Elementary and global aspects of calcium signalling
- 1997: Lily Yeh Jan – Voltage-gated and inwardly rectifying potassium channels
- 1998: Nancy J. Rothwell – Cytokines – killers in the brain?
- 1999: Richard Alan North
- 2000: Francisco Bezanilla
- 2001: Stephen O'Rahilly
- 2002: John Sulston
- 2003: Frances M. Ashcroft
- 2004: Robin F. Irvine – Inositide evolution – towards turtle domination?
- 2005: Graham J. Dockray
- 2006: M. Fishman (Fishman was unable to deliver his lecture)
- 2007: T. B. Bolton
- 2008: Robert G. Edwards (Edwards was unable to deliver his lecture)
- 2009: Stephen G. Waxman
- 2010: Roger Y. Tsien
- 2011: Carla J. Shatz
- 2012: Peter J. Ratcliffe – Oxygen sensing in animals
- 2013: Eric Gouaux – The molecular mechanisms of signaling at chemical synapses
- 2014: Richard W. Tsien – Excitation-transcription coupling: novel mechanisms and implications for brain disease
- 2015: Annette Dolphin – From trafficking of neuronal voltage-gated calcium channels to neuropathic pain
- 2016: John O'Keefe – The Cognitive Map Theory of Hippocampal Function: An update
- 2017: David Eisner – Ups and downs of calcium in the heart
- 2018: Juleen Zierath – Interplay between diet, exercise and the molecular circadian clock in orchestrating metabolic adaptations of adipose tissue
- 2019: Silvia Arber
- 2020: David Attwell
- 2022: Gero Miesenbock
- 2023: Anant Parekh
- 2024: Jens Juul Holst
- 2025: Lucilla Poston
- 2026: Susan Wray

== See also ==
- Joan Mott Prize Lecture
