= The Physiological Society =

International learned society for physiologists

- Formation: 1876
- Purpose: Support the advancement of physiology
- Headquarters: London, England
- President: Mike Tipton
- Chief Executive: Dariel Burdass
- Website: www.physoc.org

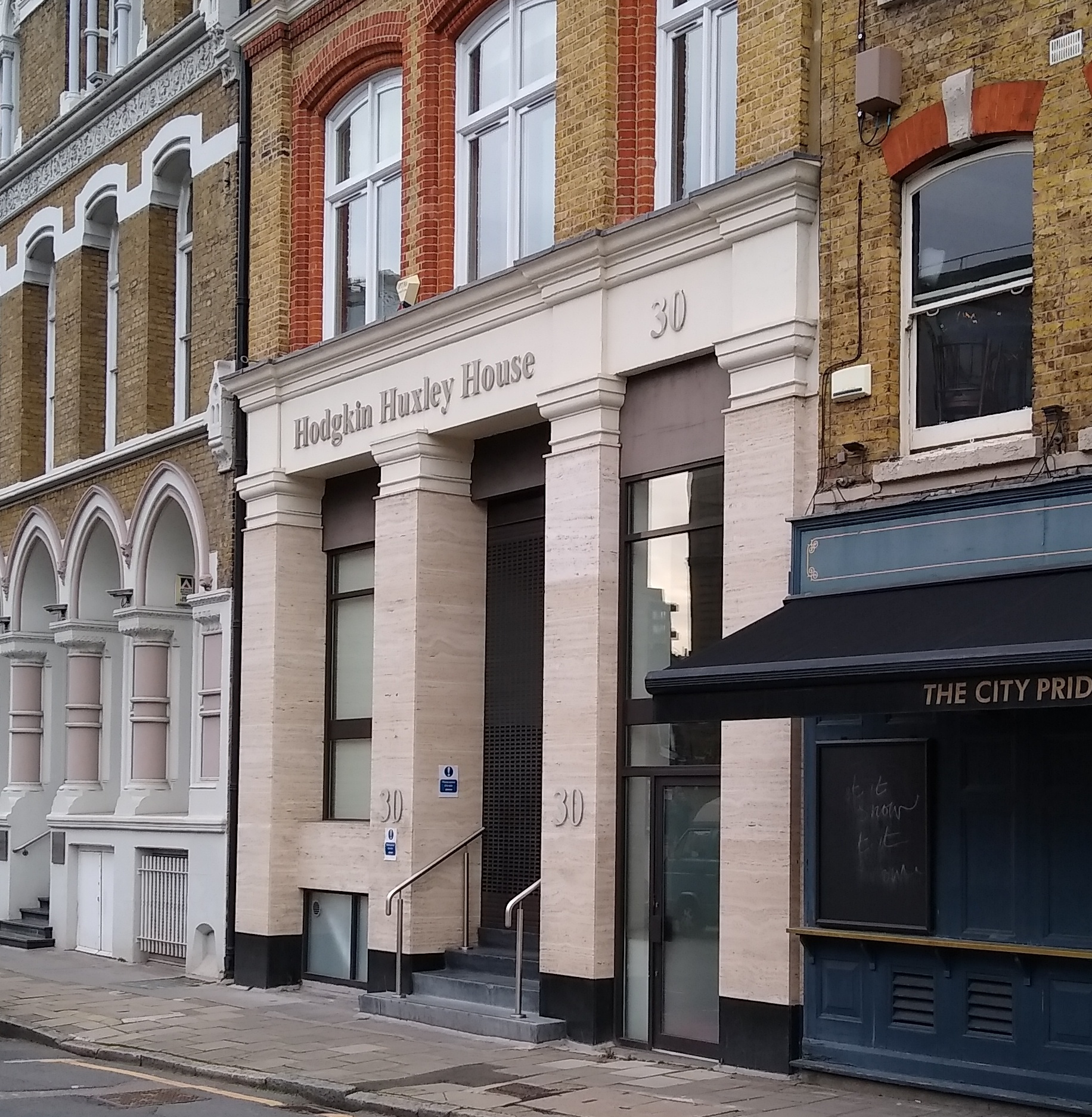
30 Farringdon Lane, location of the Physiological Society

The Physiological Society, founded in 1876, is an international learned society for physiologists with headquarters in the United Kingdom and Ireland.

== History ==
The Physiological Society was founded in 1876 as a dining society "for mutual benefit and protection" by a group of 19 physiologists, led by John Burdon Sanderson and Michael Foster, as a result of the 1875 Royal Commission on Vivisection and the subsequent 1876 Cruelty to Animals Act. Other founding members included: William Sharpey, Thomas Huxley, George Henry Lewes, Francis Galton, John Marshall, George Murray Humphry, Frederick William Pavy, Lauder Brunton, David Ferrier, Philip Pye-Smith, Walter H. Gaskell, John Gray McKendrick, Emanuel Edward Klein, Edward Schafer, Francis Darwin, George Romanes, and Gerald Yeo. The aim was to promote the advancement of physiology. Charles Darwin and William Sharpey were elected as the society's first two Honorary Members. The society first met at Sanderson's London home. The first rules of the society offered membership to no more than 40, all of whom should be male "working" physiologists. Women were first admitted as members in 1915 and the centenary of this event was celebrated in 2015.

Michael Foster was also founder of The Journal of Physiology in 1878, and was appointed to the first Chair of Physiology at the University of Cambridge in 1883.

The archives are held at the Wellcome Library.

== Present day ==
The Society is the oldest and largest network of physiologists in Europe, consisting of members from over 60 countries. The Society’s membership has included at least 61 Nobel laureates, in Physiology or Medicine (n=55), Chemistry (n=5) or Peace (n=1). The majority of members are engaged in research, in universities or industry, into how the body works in health and disease and in teaching physiology in schools and universities. The Society also facilitates communication between scientists and with other interested groups.

The Physiological Society publishes the academic journals The Journal of Physiology and Experimental Physiology, and with the American Physiological Society publishes the online only, open access journal Physiological Reports. It also publishes the membership magazine Physiology News.

In August 2024 The Society announced its first new wholly owned journals in over 100 years, with the launch of The Journal of Precision Medicine: Health and Disease and The Journal of Nutritional Physiology.

The Physiological Society is the convenor of the Global Climate and Health Summit, an international conference that brings together researchers, policymakers, health professionals, and community leaders to address the health impacts of climate change. Held in London, the Summit focuses on translating scientific evidence - particularly from physiology - into practical solutions in areas such as heat resilience, air pollution and sustainable nutrition. It aims to build cross-sector partnerships, foster policy engagement, and shape actions that protect both human health and the planet.

The society is based at Hodgkin Huxley House in Farringdon, London, named after Alan Hodgkin and Andrew Huxley.

== Presidents ==
The post of president was established in 2001, and the society's current president is Mike Tipton. Past holders include:

- 2001–2003: Colin Blakemore
- 2003–2006: Richard A. North
- 2006–2008: Ole Holger Petersen
- 2008–2010: Clive H. Orchard
- 2010–2012: Kenneth M. Spyer
- 2012–2014: Jonathan Ashmore
- 2014–2016: Richard Vaughan-Jones
- 2016–2018: David A. Eisner
- 2018–2020: Bridget Lumb
- 2020–2022: David Paterson
- 2022 – 2024: David Attwell
- 2024 - 2025: Annette Dolphin
- 2025 - Mike Tipton

== Prizes ==
The Society awards a number of prizes for meritorious achievement.

=== Annual Review Prize Lecture ===
The society considers its Annual Review Prize Lecture, first awarded in 1968, to be its premier award.

=== International Prize Lecture ===
- 2001: Nicholas B. Standen
- 2002: David I. Cook
- 2003: Jonathan F. Ashmore
- 2004: David J. Beech
- 2005: Simon C. Gandevia
- 2006: Mark J. Dunne
- 2007: David Allen
- 2010: David Attwell
- 2011: Giovanni E. Mann
- 2013: Richard Vaughan-Jones
- 2014: Kenneth M. Spyer

=== Bayliss-Starling Prize Lecture ===
Named for William Bayliss and Ernest Starling. Originally awarded every three years, since 2015 it is awarded annually alternating between established and early-career physiologists.

- 1963: Charles Lovatt Evans
- 1966: Ivan De Burgh Daly
- 1969: Archibald Hill
- 1973: Roderic Alfred Gregory
- 1976: Henry Barcroft
- 1979: David Whitteridge
- 1982: J R Pappenheimer
- 1985: Bernard Katz
- 1988: John Zachary Young
- 1991: James Black
- 1994: John Vane
- 1997: David A. Brown
- 2000: Salvador Moncada
- 2004: Gerhard Giebisch
- 2006: Roderick Flower
- 2009: Gero Miesenböck
- 2011: Jerome A. Dempsey
- 2013: Graham J. Dockray
- 2014: Steven Bloom
- 2015: Kim Barrett – Endogenous and exogenous control of gastrointestinal epithelial function: building on the legacy of Bayliss and Starling
- 2016: Lisa Heather - Cardiac metabolism in disease: All fuels are equal, but some fuels are more equal than others.
- 2017: Helen E. Raybould
- 2018: Patrick Lewis – Leucine rich repeat kinase 2: From pathology to physiology and back again
- 2020: Maria Fitzgerald

=== Biller Prize Lecture ===
Named in memory of Kathy Biller. Given to a worker in the field of renal or epithelial physiology, under 35 years old. It has now been discontinued.

- 2002: Louise Robson
- 2006: Matthew Bailey
- 2004: Donald T. Ward
- 2008: Gavin Stewart

=== G L Brown Prize Lecture ===
Named for George Lindor Brown. These lectures are delivered at various institutions and intended to stimulate an interest in physiology.

- 1975: G S Brindley and R J Linden
- 1976: P F Baker and Patrick A. Merton
- 1977: Eric Neil
- 1983: John Nicholls
- 1984: John S. Gillespie
- 1985: Michael de Burgh Daly
- 1986: Graham J. Dockray
- 1987: Semir Zeki
- 1988: Anthony Angel
- 1989: Colin Blakemore
- 1990: Nicholas B. Standen
- 1991: Roger N. Lemon
- 1992: Jonathan F. Ashmore
- 1993: Annette Dolphin
- 1994: Richard Vaughan-Jones
- 1995: Stuart Cull-Candy
- 1996: Frances M. Ashcroft
- 1997: Ian D. Forsythe
- 1998: Peter Lipp
- 1999: David J. Paterson
- 2000: Stephen Brendan McMahon
- 2001: Chris Peers
- 2002: Mark J. Dunne
- 2004: Michael J. Rennie
- 2005: Godfrey L. Smith
- 2006: C. A. Richard Boyd
- 2007: Nina Balthasa
- 2009: J Graham McGeown
- 2010: Lucilla Poston
- 2011: James Deuchars
- 2012: Anant Parekh
- 2013: David A. Eisner
- 2014: Mike Tipton
- 2015: Molly Stevens
- 2016: Rachel Tribe
- 2017: Andrew Parker
- 2018: Pamela Shaw

=== G W Harris Prize Lecture ===
Named in memory of Geoffrey Harris. Now discontinued.

- 1987: George Fink
- 1990: Ernest M. Wright
- 1993: Graham J. Dockray
- 1996: Iain C. A. F. Robinson

=== Hodgkin–Huxley–Katz Prize Lecture ===
Named after Alan Hodgkin, Andrew Huxley and Bernard Katz, and normally awarded to a physiologist from outside the UK or Ireland.

- 2000: Roderick MacKinnon
- 2002: Bert Sakmann
- 2004: Denis Noble
- 2006: Thomas J. Jentsch
- 2008: Eric Kandel
- 2010: Roger Nicoll
- 2012: Cori Bargmann
- 2013: Erin M. Schuman
- 2015: Karin Sipido – Calcium microdomains in cardiac myocytes
- 2017: Jack L. Feldman
- 2019: Stephen Traynelis

=== Joan Mott Prize Lecture ===
Named for Joan Mott.

=== Michael de Burgh Daly Prize Lecture ===
Named for Michael de Burgh Daly.

- 2002: Janice M. Marshall
- 2005: James F X Jones
- 2007: Michael J. Joyner
- 2009: Colin A. Nurse
- 2011: Tobias Wang
- 2013: Peter Carmeliet
- 2016: Nanduri R. Prabhakar
- 2018: Katrin Schröder
- 2020: F Gribble

=== Otto Hutter Teaching Prize ===
Named for Otto Hutter, and awarded to teachers of undergraduate physiology.

- 2010: Mary Cotter
- 2011: Neil Morris
- 2012: Eugene Lloyd
- 2014: Dave Lewis
- 2015: Judy Harris – Engaging students and valuing teachers
- 2016: Prem Kumar
- 2017: Louise Robson
- 2018: Julia Choate
- 2019: James Clark
2026: Derek Scott (physiologist)

=== The President's Lecture ===
Initiated in 2017, the President’s Lecture is awarded by the President of The Society to a recipient of their choosing. This prestigious lecture is awarded at the discretion of The Society’s President.

- 2019: James Pawelczyk
- 2020: Jeffrey M. Friedman
- 2021: Jessica U. Meir
- 2022: Sir Patrick Vallance

=== R Jean Banister Prize Lecture ===
Named for R Jean Banister. Awarded to an early-career physiologist and delivered at various institutions.

- 2016: Alicia D'Souza – Getting excited about pacemaking in the athletic heart: interplay of transcription factors and microRNAs in pacemaker electrophysiology.
- 2017: Nathalie L Rochefort – Decoding the visual cortex
- 2018: Bethan Phillips – Physiological adaptations to traditional and novel exercise interventions as a function of age
- 2019: Marie Holt

=== The Paton Lecture ===
Named for William D.M. Paton, and given on a historical aspect of physiology.

- 1994: John Wendell Severinghaus
- 1995: Hans Ussing
- 1996: Patrick D. Wall
- 1997: Vernon B. Mountcastle
- 1998: Daniel P. Todes
- 2005: John H. Coote
- 2007: Denis Noble
- 2008: Kenneth M. Spyer
- 2009: Diethelm W. Richter
- 2010: Murray Esler
- 2011: John B. West
- 2012: Jere Mitchell
- 2013: Geoffrey Burnstock
- 2014: Peter Sleight
- 2015: Tilli Tansey
- 2016: Bert Sakmann
- 2017: Tom Kirkwood
- 2018: Josephine Arendt
- 2019: Kevin Fong
- 2020: Semir Zeki

=== Annual Public Lecture ===
Intended to raise awareness and understanding of physiology among the general public and schools.

- 2005: Julian F. R. Paton
- 2006: David Attwell
- 2008: Peter Weissberg
- 2009: Stephen O'Rahilly
- 2010: Nancy J. Rothwell
- 2011: Russell Foster – How your body clock makes you tick
- 2012: Gareth Leng – The loving brain
- 2013: Russell Foster
- 2014: Robert Winston
- 2015: Sophie Scott – The science of laughter
- 2016: John F. Cryan
- 2018: Daniel Martin – From mountains to the bedside: Lessons learnt from Everest
- 2019: Lora Heisler

=== Sharpey-Schafer Lecture and Prize ===
Named after Edward Albert Sharpey-Schafer. Awarded alternating between established and early-career physiologists.

- 1983: Torsten Wiesel
- 1986: David Attwell
- 1989: Bertil Hille
- 1992: Graham Collingridge
- 1995: Judah Folkman
- 1998: Julian F. R. Paton
- 2002: Erwin Neher
- 2005: Neville H. McClenaghan
- 2008: Walter Boron
- 2011: Walter Marcotti
- 2013: William A. Catterall
- 2016: Emma Hart
- 2019: Roger Smith

=== Wellcome Prize Lecture ===
Awarded to young physiologists (under 40). Now discontinued.

- 1986: Kevin A. C. Martin
- 1988: David A. Eisner
- 1990: Andrew J. King
- 1992: Hugh R. Matthews
- 1994: Wolf Reik
- 1996: Stewart O. Sage
- 1998: Leon Lagnado
- 2000: Daniela Riccardi
- 2002: Anant Parekh
- 2004: Alexander V. Gourine
- 2006: Helen Kennedy
- 2008: Andrew W. Trafford

=== GSK Prize Lecture ===
Awarded to early-career physiologists. Now discontinued.

- 2010: Josef Kittler
- 2011: Not awarded
- 2012: Holly Shiels
- 2013: Mala Shah
