= Institute of Naval Medicine =

- INM
- Location within Hampshire

General information
- Type: Military medical training facility
- Location: Crescent Road, Gosport, Hampshire, PO12 2DL
- Coordinates: 50.78°N 1.142°W
- Elevation: 10 m (33 ft)
- Current tenants: Royal Navy Medical Service
- Construction started: 1969
- Completed: 1969
- Inaugurated: 26 September 1969
- Client: Ministry of Defence
- Owner: Royal Navy

Technical details
- Floor count: 2

Website
- Institute of Naval Medicine - Royal Navy

The Institute of Naval Medicine is the main research centre and training facility of the Royal Navy Medical Service. The Institute was established in Alverstoke, Gosport, in 1969.

The Institute today offers 'specialist medical training, guidance and support from service entry to resettlement', and provides 'extensive research, laboratory and clinical facilities' for use across the armed services.

== History ==
=== Royal Naval Medical School ===
First established at Royal Naval College, Greenwich in 1912, the Royal Naval Medical School provided induction training for new-entry medical officers, and promotion training for the rank of Fleet Surgeon (later Surgeon Lieutenant Commander). The initial course provided prospective naval surgeons with the skills to function as a sole practitioner at sea; subjects taught included naval hygiene, dentistry, radiography, anaesthetics and tropical medicine. It was from the start a research-focused institution, which in its early decades played a key role in the production of vaccines and sera. Clinical training took place initially at the Dreadnought Seamen's Hospital, then (after the First World War) at the London Hospital; courses prior to the Second World War were validated by the University of London.

In the early 1930s induction training moved to Haslar, but other teaching and research work continued to be based at Greenwich; by that time the RMNS was engaged in 'a very large amount of highly technical work of the greatest importance to the health of the Navy', including research, analytics, pathological examinations, tropical disease investigations and vaccine making.

The Royal Naval Medical School was removed from Greenwich to Clevedon at the start of World War II, where it remained until 1948. During the war its work continued: in the back garden of a house on Elton Road, Clevedon, in 1942 the RNMS constructed the world's first fully functional factory for the mass production of penicillin.

In 1948 the Royal Naval Medical School was relocated to Monckton House, Alverstoke. The [[Royal Naval Physiological]Laboratory]] had been established here in 1942, a joint project of the RN Scientific Service and the RN Medical Service.

In the 1960s short courses were offered in atomic, underwater and tropical medicine. At the same time, the RNMS began to undertake increasingly specialised medical research in support of the Polaris submarine-launched nuclear weapons programme. Specialised research, training and radiological protection facilities were built in the grounds of Monckton House, and in 1969 the establishment was renamed the Institute of Naval Medicine.

=== Institute of Naval Medicine ===
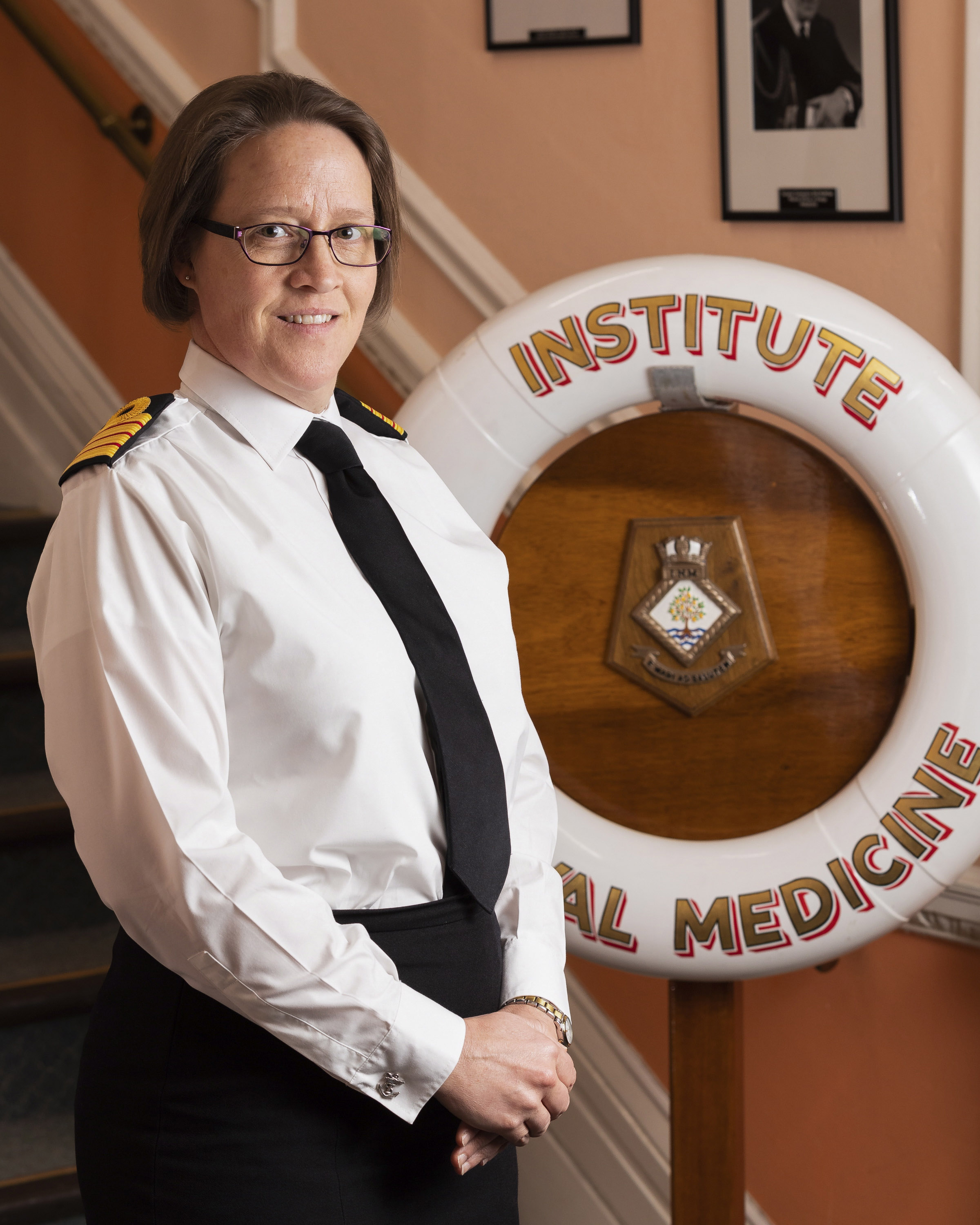
Surgeon Captain Beth Crowson, CO of the Institute of Naval Medicine 2019-2022.

At a safety conference on Saturday 25 March 1972 at the University of Birmingham, organised by the National Council of British Mountaineering, with around five hundred climbing experts present, Surgeon Commander Duncan Walters (August 1927 - August 2021) showed a film entitled Give Him Air, about a swimmer in Malta that was accidentally speared in the lung by a harpoon gun. The film showed the gruesome after-effects of the harpoon incident, which caused eight conference attendees to faint, and had to be carried outside. The film was on the subjects of mountaineering injuries, and expedition medicine. The conference chairman was Sir Jack Longland. It was recommended that walkers on mountains in North Wales were guided by someone with the Mountain Leadership Certificate. In 1970, 43% of those injured on mountains in North Wales were aged 15 to 20.

In November 1973 a £200,000 environmental medical centre opened, which simulated life inside a submarine. From 12 November 1973, four sailors (medical ratings) were shut inside this for thirty days, to test atmospheric pollution.

J and P Engineering Reading Ltd developed a photo-sensitive radiation detector for the institute, later sold to the National Radiological Protection Board (NRPB) in Oxfordshire and for CERN.

At a conference in Aberdeen in September 1988, Surgeon Captain Ramsay Pearson, head of undersea medicine, said that recreational diving in the UK had too many accidents, due to decompression computers, which he claimed did not have built-in safety factors. The National Hyperbaric Centre in Aberdeen (built by the government in 1987) agreed with him.

In August 2000 the site sent four doctors and two staff to the Kursk submarine disaster in a team of twenty-seven from the UK.

As of 2005 the Institute's mission statement was 'to improve the operational capability of the Royal Navy by promoting good health and safety and maximising the effectiveness of personnel'. Its five 'principal business areas' were:

- Scientific advice on maritime and military health and safety
- Operationally deployable specialist medical and scientific staff (principally focusing on diving, submarine and radiation medicine)
- Specialist training
- Research and equipment testing
- Corporate services (including medico-legal advice, medical resettlement, libraries and biostatistics).

=== Sports and survival medicine ===
The Channel 5 documentary Survivor featured the institute, and surviving cold temperatures on the Cascade Range, on Wednesday 28 January 1998. Sir Ranulph Fiennes visited on Monday 11 October 1999, when he was put in an immersion tank.

The British Olympic coxless four men's rowing team had medical tests, with a vitalograph for lung function in 2008, later winning the gold medal in August 2012.

== Activity ==
=== Training ===
It trained medical staff for the Naval Emergency Monitoring Team at three sites at Gare Loch, Portsmouth and Plymouth, which worked with the Nuclear Accident Response Organisation (NARO) at the Clyde Submarine Base (HMNB Clyde)

In 1970s, nurses in the navy trained at the navy hospitals in Gosport and Plymouth; the Royal Naval School of Nursing began around 1962, in Gosport. There is longer a navy site at Plymouth, but there is a Ministry of Defence Hospital Unit - MODHU at Plymouth hospital; all medical assistants would complete 22 weeks of training at the RN Hospital in Gosport, followed by another 32 weeks at the RN hospitals at Gosport or Plymouth for naval (ship) medical assistants. Submarine medical assistants (MASM) would be trained at the institute, such as in radiation decontamination.

Medical assistants are trained at the Defence Medical Academy in Whittington, Staffordshire, with nuclear training at the Nuclear Department at HMS Sultan in Gosport, which will move to Scotland. The Department of Nuclear Science and Technology moved from London in October 1998.

=== Research ===
==== Drowning ====
The site has done much research into drowning, which kills 700–1000 a year in the UK, with a third being males aged 15–35. Surgeon Commander Frank Golden (5 June 1936 - 5 January 2014), the Director of Research in the 1980s, conducted many important investigations. Many able swimmers died, no more than 10 yards from refuge, from effects of cold water. Frank Golden later worked with Professor Mike Tipton at the University of Surrey Robens Institute. Together they wrote the book Essentials of Sea Survival in 2002. (ISBN 9780736002158)

So-called 'dry drowning' is caused by the shock of cold water. A possible cause is cold water causing the larynx to spasm. Animals have a 'diving response', but humans hyperventilate, and the heart beats too quickly due to a chemical imbalance.

Drowning is the third most common form of accidental death in the UK after road accidents and home injuries. It is often competent swimmers in canals, rivers or flooded quarries in spring or early summer, and there has not been much research on this form of drowning. Most deaths occur in the first three minutes, and those who last 15 minutes mostly last to 30 minutes. Admiral Frank Golden in the 1990s thought that the deaths were linked to the gasp reflex as found in cold showers. There is a big increase in blood pressure and heart rate. Uncontrolled rate breathing makes swimming impossible due to the cold shock response. Work had neen carried out with the University of Leeds on 'immersion hypothermia'.

==== Diving ====
In the 1990s, Surgeon Commander James Francis found 'nitrogen narcosis' below 30m of water depth. James Francis became Head of Undersea Medicine and left the Navy in 1996.

The INM works with The Physiological Society, and staff have given lectures at the Society in London.

=== Exposure and cold temperatures ===
Surgeon Commander Jim Sykes, the Professor of Naval Occupation Medicine, researched exposure.

Surgeon Commander Howard Oakley researched exposure in the 1990s, and drowning, and premature junctional contraction.

==== Seasickness ====
In November 1979 the site tested a new seasickness pill on HMS Broadsword, called cinnarizine, with reference to the previous medication hyoscine (scopolamine), and worked with the MRC

==== Women submariners ====
In 2010 the USA allowed women on its submarines but women submariners were not allowed in the UK as carbon dioxide in a submarine's atmosphere could damage a foetus.

In December 2011 women were allowed on submarines, with officers first then all women from 2015. All women would serve on the Astute class submarines from 2016. Women had been on surface ships since 1990. There are around 3420 females in the Royal Navy, about 9%.

== Structure ==
It is situated in the south of Gosport. The Medical Officer-in-Charge is also the Dean of Naval Medicine.

=== Departments ===
- Diving and Hyperbaric Medicine, when known as the Undersea Medicine Department, it worked with the Submarine Escape Training Tank and HMS Reclaim
- Submarine and Radiation Medicine; the Naval Radiological Protection Service became the Defence R P S in 1982 which became DERA Radiation Protection Services
- Environmental and Industrial Hazards Laboratories, investigates drinking water
- Environmental Medicine and Science; the EMU - Environmental Medicine Unit had a Fitness Anthropometric Clinic
- Applied Physiology and Human Factors, investigates nutrition and supports the Defence Nutrition Advisory Service
- Acoustics and Vibration, has worked with the Institute of Sound and Vibration Research at the University of Southampton; the Royal Navy has an exemption from the Control of Vibration at Work Regulations 2005
- Cold Injury Clinic
- RNMS School, works with the Resuscitation Council UK on first aid

=== Medical Officers in Charge ===
- Surgeon Rear Admiral Sir James Watt 1969–72
- Surgeon Rear Admiral A. O'Connor 24 July 1972 - 1975
- Surgeon Rear Admiral Sir John Rawlins 1975–77
- Surgeon Rear Admiral Sir John Harrison 30 March 1977 - 1981
- Surgeon Rear Admiral R. J. A. Lambert 1981-1983
- Surgeon Captain E. P. Beck 1983-1985
- Surgeon Commodore J. W. Richardson 1985-1987
- Surgeon Captain R. W. F. Paul 1987-1989
- Surgeon Captain A. Craig 1989-1990
- Surgeon Captain J. W. Davies 1991-1993
- Surgeon Rear Admiral A. Craig 1993-1994
- Surgeon Commodore F Reed OBE - 2005
- Surgeon Commodore Jim Sykes 2005-2008
- Surgeon Captain D.C. Brown 25 September 2008 - 2011
- Surgeon Captain N.P. Butterfield August 2011 - 2012
- Surgeon Captain M.A. Howell September 2012 -

== See also ==
- Diving Diseases Research Centre – British hyperbaric medical organization in Devon
- Diving disorders – Physiological disorders resulting from underwater diving
- RAF Centre of Aviation Medicine – Organisation conducting aerospace medicine research in the UK in Bedfordshire
- Institut de recherche biomédicale des armées, military medical research site in France
- The Extreme Environments Laboratories, at the University of Portsmouth
