= Susan Wray =

Cellular and molecular physiologist

Sue Wray FMedSci FRCOG MAE
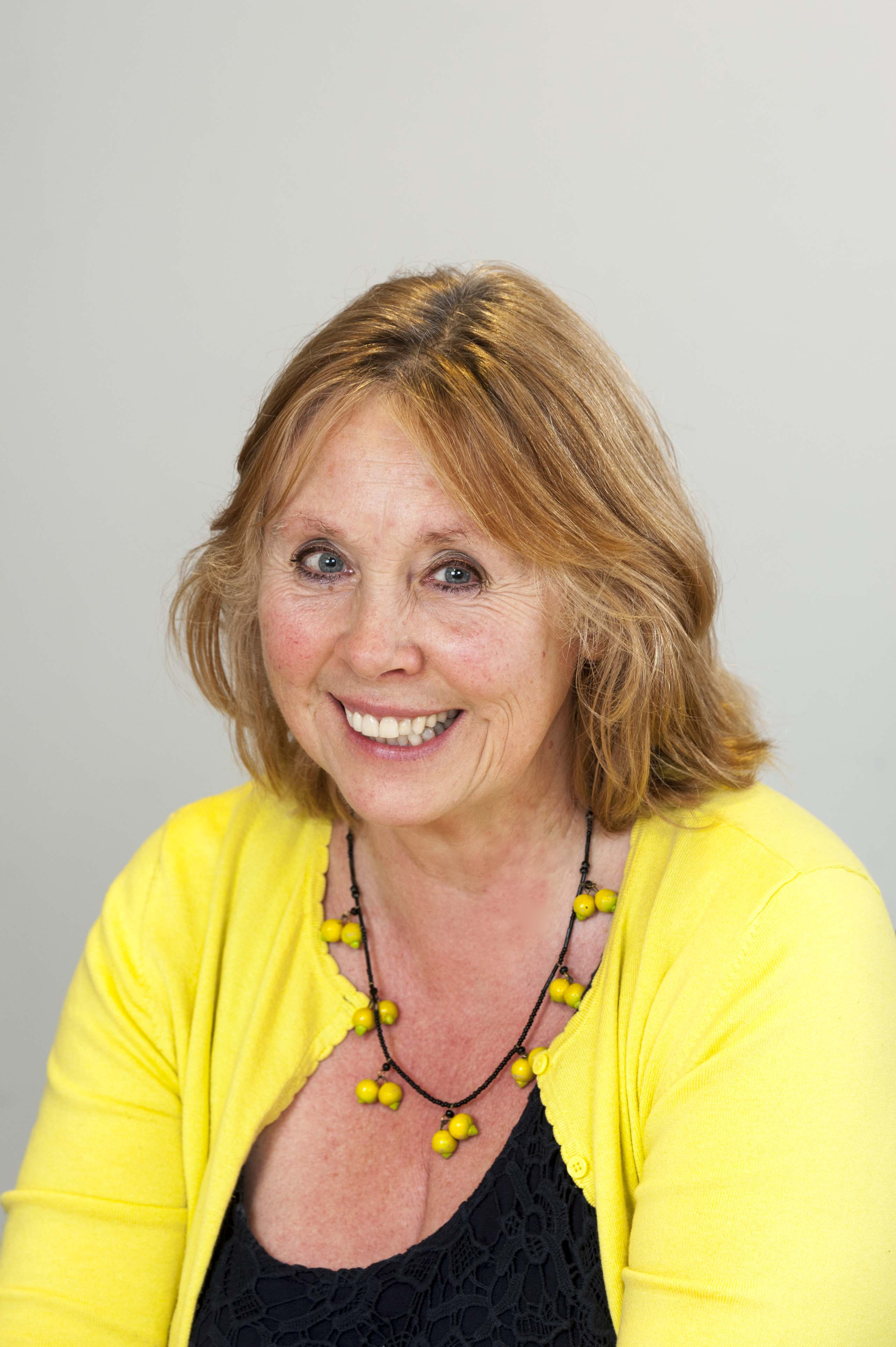
- Born: Susan C. Wray
- Education: Chadderton Grammar School for Girls
- Alma mater: University College London (BSc, PhD)
- Awards: Joan Mott Prize Lecture (2006)
- Scientific career
- Fields: Smooth muscle physiology Reproduction; Cell signalling
- Institutions: University College London; University of Liverpool
- Thesis: Factors controlling involution of connective tissue in the uterus (1980)
- Doctoral advisor: Robert Harkness
- Website: https://susanwray.co.uk/

Susan C. Wray FMedSci FRCOG MAE is professor of cellular and molecular physiology at the University of Liverpool. She has served as the President of the International Union of Physiological Sciences (IUPS) and as President of the Federation of European Physiological Societies (FEPS). She was the founding editor-in-chief of Physiological Reports. and is the first editor-in-chief of Current Research in Physiology. She directed the centre of better births in Liverpool Women's Hospital which was opened in 2013 with funding of £2.5 million with the objective of basic scientists working together with clinicians on problems during pregnancy. Along with Zarko Alfirevic, she led the Harris wellbeing preterm birth centre. Wray is the director of the University of Liverpool Athena SWAN and team leader for the institute of translational medicine. Her primary research interests are in smooth muscle physiology, reproductive medicine and cell signalling.

== Education ==
After attending the local authority-run Chadderton Grammar School for Girls, Wray received her Bachelor of Science degree in physiology and, in 1979, her PhD from University College London for research investigating gestational changes in the connective tissue of the uterus.

== Career and research ==
After postdoctoral research at UCL she moved to the University of Liverpool in 1990 where she was promoted to professor in 1996 and served as head of the department of physiology from 2004 to 2008. Wray's early research focused on changes of connective tissue in the uterus during and after pregnancy. She then helped develop spectroscopic methods to characterize metabolism in human neonates. Since moving to Liverpool, she has focused on the relationship between metabolism and function in smooth muscle. In particular, she has elucidated the effects of pH on contractility. In order to elucidate the underlying mechanisms, she performed some of the first measurements of intracellular calcium in smooth muscle. Subsequent work into the relationship between calcium and excitability led to new understanding of the origin of the refractory period in the ureter. Her translational work has led to measurements of lactate to predict labour outcome and to the use of bicarbonate to increase the pH of the mother and thereby increase the strength of uterine contractions, reducing the requirement for caesarean sections. She has also shown that problems of labour experienced by obese mothers can be explained by impaired smooth muscle contractility. In 2015, she demonstrated a novel mechanism whereby repetitive, transient episodes of hypoxia increase uterine contractions during labour. Her work has also investigated the use of plant-derived cyclotides as well as modifications to the natural hormone oxytocin to serve as templates for novel compounds to accelerate labor. Some of her research can be seen in a video of one of her lectures.

=== Women in Science ===
Wray has been engaged with gender equality and mentoring throughout her career. She is an academic champion for the Higher Education Foundation AURORA Women in Leadership Scheme. She gave the inaugural Athena Swan Lecture at Edge Hill University in 2016. She also worked on the SUSTAIN initiative for women in science. With Tilli Tansey she co-edited the book Women physiologists: centenary celebrations and beyond for The Physiological Society which includes forewords by Julia Higgins and Susan Greenfield. This book has been used as a source to encourage the writing of more Wikipedia articles about women physiologists. Wikipedia:Meetup/UK/University of Manchester Women in Physiology, October 2019

=== Awards and honours ===
Wray was elected a Fellow of the Academy of Medical Sciences (FMedSci) in 2002, an honorary fellow of the Royal College of Obstetricians and Gynaecologists (FRCOG) in 2006 and a member of the Academia Europaea (MAE) in 2008. She was awarded the Joan Mott Prize Lecture by The Physiological Society in 2006 and the Annual Review Lecture in 2026. She was also elected as an honorary member of the Physiological Society in 2015. She has been honoured with the Christian Bohr Lifetime Achievement Award by The Scandinavian Physiological Society. In 2012 she was nominated a knowledge hero by the Liverpool Echo'.
