= Stephen Brendan McMahon =

British neuroscientist (1954–2021)

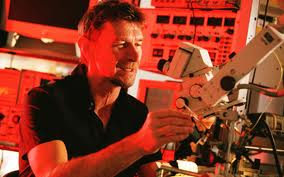
- Born: 21 December 1954; London, United Kingdom
- Died: 9 October 2021 (aged 66)
- Education: University of Leeds (BSc); University of Leeds (PhD)
- Known for: Pain research
- Awards: Bonica IASP, British Neuroscience Association 2019 Outstanding Contribution of Neuroscience
- Scientific career
- Fields: Neuroscience; Physiology
- Workplaces: University of Leeds (BSC, PhD); University College London (Lecturer); St. Thomas' Hospital (Lecturer); King's College London (Professor)

Stephen "Mac" McMahon (21 December 1954 – 9 October 2021) was the Sherrington Professor of Physiology in the Wolfson Centre for Age-Related Diseases at King's College London, and Director of the Wellcome Trust.

McMahon was also an editor of the 5th and 6th editions of Wall and Melzack’s Textbook of Pain, and published more than 300 research articles.

== Education ==
McMahon studied at the University of Leeds where he earned a BSc (Hons) degree in 1973 and a PhD in Physiology in 1979. His thesis, An electrophysiological study of spinal neurons activated by stimulation of the abdominal viscera, focused on visceral sensory processing and was supervised by John F B Morrison.

== Career and research ==
Stephen McMahon joined Patrick Wall's group at University College London in 1981, and trained with him throughout the 1980s. In 1984, he started his own research group at St. Thomas' Hospital Medical School. McMahon led a research laboratory at the Wolfson Centre in central London from 1985 to 2021. He became the Sherrington Professor of Physiology in the Wolfson Centre for Age-Related Diseases at King's College London in 1996.

The McMahon laboratory used a wide range of techniques to understand basic pain physiology on both systemic (pain pathways) and molecular (pain mediators and receptors) levels. This included molecular biology, in-vivo and ex-vivo electrophysiology, behavioural studies in animal models, in vivo imaging, RNA-seq, and genome profiling in human patients. Additionally, McMahon's research worked to translate basic pain mechanisms to the clinic, contributing to research on GDNF, NGF and P2RX3 receptors. This work lead to several phase I, II and III clinical trials for pain treatment.The McMahon lab also contributed to neuroregeneration following spinal cord injury and peripheral nerve damage.

Major contributions of the McMahon research group include:

- Mapping activity-induced changes in the receptive fields of spinal neurons.
- Demonstrating that neurotrophic factors such as nerve growth factor (NGF) and brain-derived neurotrophic factor (BDNF) can act as pain mediators.
- Demonstrating that the enzyme chondroitinase ABC can be used to promote growth and functional recovery after spinal cord injury. His work on the role of P2X3 receptors in the periphery and spinal cord contributed to the development of P2X3 and P2X2 inhibitors as treatments for chronic pain and cough treatment.
- Adapting the technique of in viva calcium imaging for use in peripheral sensory neurons. This technique visualizes the activity of large numbers of neurons at once.

McMahon was the editor of the 5th and 6th editions of Wall and Melzack’s Textbook of Pain. He published more than 300 research articles in scientific journals including Nature, Nature Medicine, Science Translational Medicine, Nature Neuroscience, Cell, Neuron, and the Journal of Neuroscience, with an H-index of 98.

Some researchers who trained with Stephen McMahon went on to become professors, including Gary Lewin, Andrew Rice, Elizabeth Bradbury, and David Bennett.

== Awards and Honors ==
McMahon received a number of awards for his research, including:

- Outstanding Contribution to Neuroscience Award from the British Neuroscience Association (2019),
- The Patrick Wall Lecture from the Australian Pain Society (2018),
- The John J. Bonica Distinguished Lecture Award from the International Association for the Study of Pain (2016),
- The GL Brown Lecturer Award from the Physiological Society (2001).

He was elected a Fellow of the Academy of Medical Sciences (FMedSci) in 1999.

== Wellcome Trust Pain Consortium and collective efforts ==
Among many individual prizes and grants, McMahon was involved with large collaborative efforts to understand pain pathophysiology. McMahon directed the Wellcome Trust Pain Consortium (previously known as the London Pain Consortium). He was an academic lead on Europain, an EU-IMI consortium and Deputy Chair of the MRC Neuroscience and Mental Health Board. He was a Principal Investigator for the BonePain: European Training Network to Combat Bone Pain.

== Death ==
Stephen McMahon died from cancer at age 66.
