= Jack Feldman =

Jack Feldman may refer to:

- Jack L. Feldman, American neuroscientist
- Jack M. Feldman, American psychologist
- Jack Feldman (songwriter), American lyricist

== See also ==
- John Feldmann (born 1967), American musician and producer
