= Annette Dolphin =

British scientist (1951–2026)

Annette Dolphin FRS FMedSci
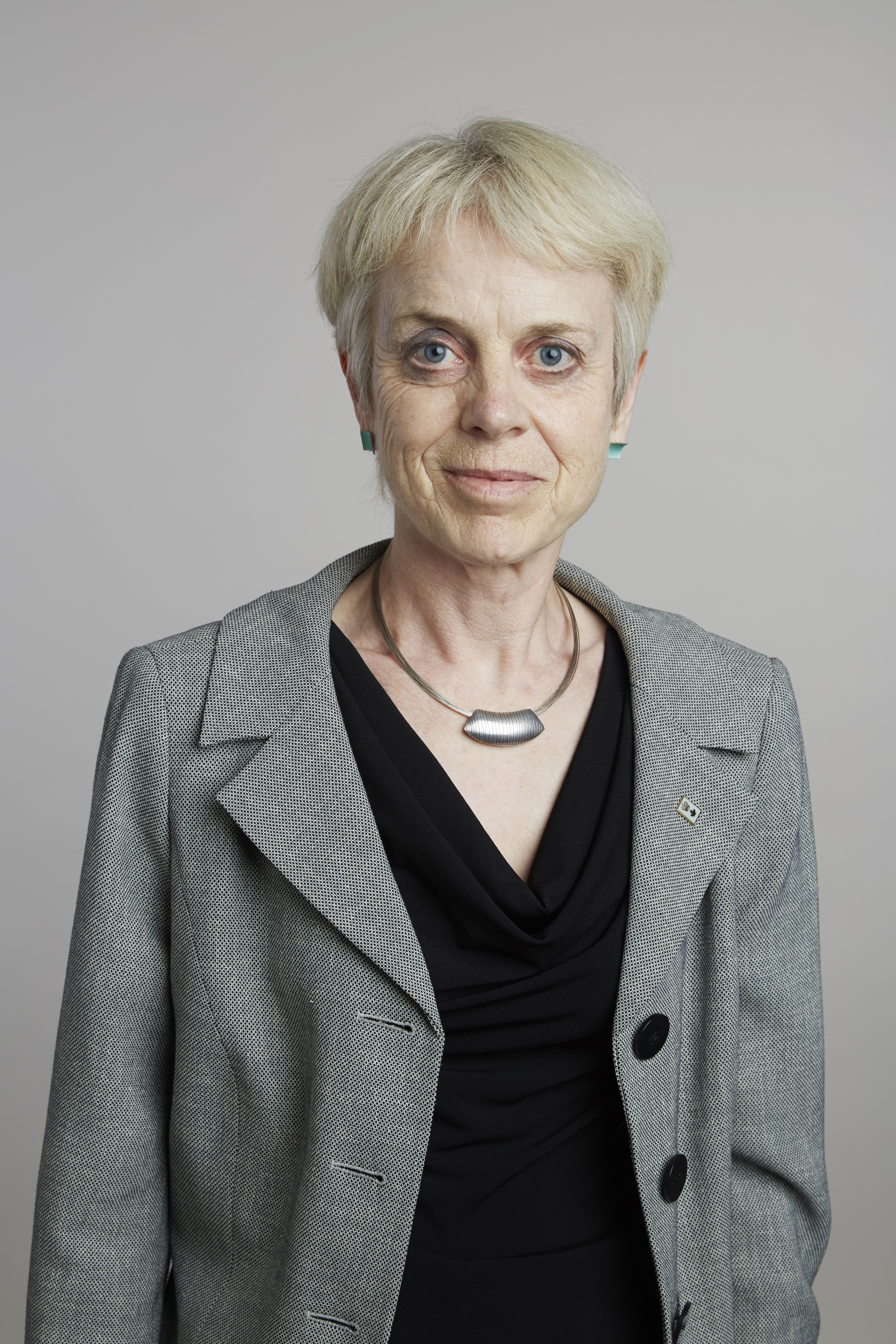
- Dolphin in 2015
- Born: Annette Catherine Dolphin; 1951; Maidenhead, Berkshire, England
- Died: 26 January 2026 (aged 74)
- Education: University of Oxford (BA); King's College London (PhD)
- Awards: Physiological Society Annual Review Prize Lecture (2015)
- Scientific career
- Fields: Neuroscience; Calcium channels; Pharmacology
- Workplaces: University College London; Collège de France; Yale University; National Institute for Medical Research (NIMR); St George's Hospital Medical School; Royal Free Hospital School of Medicine
- Thesis: Behavioural and Biochemical Consequences of Cerebral Noradrenaline Receptor Stimulation (1977)
- Website: ucl.ac.uk/~ucklado

Annette Catherine Dolphin (1951 – 26 January 2026) was a British scientist who was professor of pharmacology in the Department of Neuroscience, Physiology and Pharmacology at University College London (UCL).

== Early life and education ==
Dolphin was born in Maidenhead, Berkshire, England in 1951. She was educated at the University of Oxford, where she was awarded a Bachelor of Arts degree in biochemistry in 1973, and the Institute of Psychiatry at King's College London where she was awarded a PhD in 1977 for research on noradrenaline receptors.

== Career and research ==
Dolphin was a leader in the field of neuronal voltage-gated calcium channels. She was distinguished for her work on the regulation of calcium channel trafficking and function, and the modulation of that function by activation of G-protein coupled receptors. Her work on the control of calcium channel trafficking by auxiliary calcium channel subunits was particularly influential. She elucidated the topology and processing of this family of proteins.

She held appointments at the Collège de France, Yale University, the National Institute for Medical Research, St George's, University of London and the Royal Free Hospital School of Medicine. She joined University College London as a professor in the Department of Neuroscience, Physiology and Pharmacology in 1997.

== Death ==
Dolphin died of cancer on 26 January 2026, aged 74. She inherited Lynch syndrome and was treated for three previous cancers throughout her life. She died due to a fourth, duodenal cancer.

== Awards and honours ==
Dolphin received a number awards for her research, including the British Pharmacological Society (BPS) Sandoz Prize and the Pfizer Prize in Biology. She was also awarded prize lectures such as the G. L. Brown Prize Lecture of The Physiological Society, the Julius Axelrod Distinguished Lecture in Neuroscience of the University of Toronto, the BPS Gary Price Memorial Lecture and, most recently, the Mary Pickford Lecture of the University of Edinburgh and the Physiological Society Annual Review Prize Lecture in 2015.

She was elected a Fellow of the Academy of Medical Sciences (FMedSci) in 1999 and a Fellow of the Royal Society (FRS) in 2015.

Dolphin held the Presidency of the British Neuroscience Association from 2019 to 2021, leading the Association through the challenging years of the COVID-19 pandemic and facilitating its ongoing growth. In 2022 she was elected to become the 2024–2026 President of The Physiological Society. She was also elected to the Council of the Royal Society (2023–25).

== Selected work ==
- Dolphin, A. C.; Errington, M. L.; Bliss, T. V. P. (1982). "Long-term potentiation of the perforant path in vivo is associated with increased glutamate release". Nature. 297 (5866): 496–497. Bibcode:1982Natur.297..496D. doi:10.1038/297496a0. ISSN 0028-0836. PMID 6123949. S2CID 4255128.
- Dolphin, A. C. (1998). "Mechanisms of modulation of voltage-dependent calcium channels by G proteins". The Journal of Physiology. 506 (1): 3–11. doi:10.1111/j.1469-7793.1998.003bx.x. PMC 2230712. PMID 9481669.
- Dolphin, Annette C. (2003). "Subunits of Voltage-Gated Calcium Channels". Journal of Bioenergetics and Biomembranes. 35 (6): 599–620. doi:10.1023/B:JOBB.0000008026.37790.5a. ISSN 0145-479X. PMID 15000522. S2CID 1425656.
- Field, M. J.; Cox, P. J.; Stott, E; Melrose, H; Offord, J; Su, T. Z.; Bramwell, S; Corradini, L; England, S; Winks, J; Kinloch, R. A.; Hendrich, J; Dolphin, A. C.; Webb, T; Williams, D (2006). "Identification of the alpha2-delta-1 subunit of voltage-dependent calcium channels as a molecular target for pain mediating the analgesic actions of pregabalin". Proceedings of the National Academy of Sciences. 103 (46): 17537–42. Bibcode:2006PNAS..10317537F. doi:10.1073/pnas.0409066103. PMC 1859964. PMID 17088553.
