= Nathalie L. Rochefort =

Neuroscientist

- Born: Paris, France
- Education: University Paris 7; École Normale Supérieure; Ruhr-Universität-Bochum
- Scientific career
- Fields: Neuroscience
- Workplaces: University of Edinburgh
- Website: rochefortlab.co.uk

Nathalie L. Rochefort (born about 1979) is a Professor of Neuroscience at the University of Edinburgh who researches neural networking processes and their implications for disorders such as intellectual disabilities, as well as how restricted caloric intake affects sensory processing.

== Education ==
Rochefort earned a bachelors degree in life sciences, with high honours, at University Paris 7 from 1995–1997. From 1997–2001, Roquefort took a masters in biology and biochemistry, at Ecole Normale Supérieure, Paris, with honours, and a masters in Epistemology and History of Sciences, University Paris 7, with high honours. Rochefort completed a Ph.D. in the International Graduate School of Neuroscience at Ruhr-Universität Bochum in 2007. Rochefort's summa cum laude dissertation, Functional specificity of callosal connections in the cat visual cortex, was supervised by Chantal Milleret and Ulf Eysel.

== Career ==
Rochefort joined the University of Edinburgh in 2013 as a Chancellor's Fellow at the Centre for Integrative Neurophysiology. There, Rochefort was on the team that developed a hair-thin fiber endoscope for studying brain activity. According to Physics World, "Rochefort, the co-supervisor of the project, believes that one of the future applications of this new minimally invasive approach would be to observe neuronal activities in deep-brain structures in behaving animals. This way, neuroscientists will hopefully be able to investigate the many remaining knowledge gaps regarding memory formation and sensory perception, for instance."

Within the Simons Initiative Developing Brain Center, Rochefort leads the laboratory's focus on understanding neural networking in visual information processing, and implications for disorders such as intellectual disabilities and autism spectrum disorders. Rochefort's research has demonstrated that restricted caloric intake impacts sensory processing in male mice, and also has demonstrated the protected status of the brain during reduced caloric intake. Quanta Magazine reported that Rochefort, "thinks that the newly observed changes in how cortical neurons operate when food is scarce could affect learning and memory processes."

Rochefort also chairs the Wellcome Trust Brain and Behavioural Sciences Early-Career Advisory Group that shortlists candidates for Wellcome Early-Career Awards.

== Awards and grants ==
- 2024: Women in Neuroscience UK Leading Researcher: Cognition and Neurodevelopment Winner
- 2019: European Research Council (ERC) Consolidator Grant, for "SweetVision – a project Envisioning the Reward: Neuronal circuits for goal-directed learning"
- 2019: EMBO Young Investigator Award
- 2017: The Physiological Society R Jean Banister Prize
- 2014 – 2021: Sir Henry Dale fellowship from the Wellcome Trust and the Royal Society
- 2013 – 2022: Chancellor's Fellow, University of Edinburgh, UK
- 2013: Schilling Research Award of the German Neuroscience Society 2013
- 2011: Bernard Katz Lecture Award, Alexander von Humboldt Foundation
- 2006: Research prize from the French national association for the blind and visually–disabled people (FAF)

== Selected publications ==
Note: According to Google Scholar, as of June 2026, the first publication below has been cited more than 100 times, and the rest of the publications have been cited between 331–620 times.

- Padamsey, Zahid; Katsanevaki, Danai; Dupuy, Nathalie; Rochefort, Nathalie L. (19 January 2022). "Neocortex saves energy by reducing coding precision during food scarcity". Neuron. 110 (2): 280–296.e10. doi:10.1016/j.neuron.2021.10.024. ISSN 0896-6273. PMC 8788933. PMID 34741806.
- Turtaev, Sergey; Leite, Ivo T.; Altwegg-Boussac, Tristan; Pakan, Janelle M. P.; Rochefort, Nathalie L.; Čižmár, Tomáš (2018-11-21). "High-fidelity multimode fibre-based endoscopy for deep brain in vivo imaging". Light: Science & Applications. 7 (1): 92. doi:10.1038/s41377-018-0094-x. ISSN 2047-7538. PMC 6249210.
- Jia, Hongbo; Rochefort, Nathalie L.; Chen, Xiaowei; Konnerth, Arthur (April 2010). "Dendritic organization of sensory input to cortical neurons in vivo". Nature. 464 (7293): 1307–1312. Bibcode:2010Natur.464.1307J. doi:10.1038/nature08947. ISSN 1476-4687. PMID 20428163.
- Chen, Xiaowei; Leischner, Ulrich; Rochefort, Nathalie L.; Nelken, Israel; Konnerth, Arthur (July 2011). "Functional mapping of single spines in cortical neurons in vivo". Nature. 475 (7357): 501–505. Bibcode:2011Natur.475..501C. doi:10.1038/nature10193. ISSN 1476-4687. PMID 21706031.
- Rochefort, Nathalie L.; Konnerth, Arthur (August 2012). "Dendritic spines: from structure to in vivo function". EMBO Reports. 13 (8): 699–708. doi:10.1038/embor.2012.102. ISSN 1469-3178. PMC 3410382. PMID 22791026.
- Turtaev, Sergey; Leite, Ivo T.; Altwegg-Boussac, Tristan; Pakan, Janelle M. P.; Rochefort, Nathalie L.; Čižmár, Tomáš (2018-11-21). "High-fidelity multimode fibre-based endoscopy for deep brain in vivo imaging". Light: Science & Applications. 7 (1): 92. arXiv:1806.01654. Bibcode:2018LSA.....7...92T. doi:10.1038/s41377-018-0094-x. ISSN 2047-7538. PMC 6249210. PMID 30479758.
- Rochefort, Nathalie L.; Garaschuk, Olga; Milos, Ruxandra-Iulia; Narushima, Madoka; Marandi, Nima; Pichler, Bruno; Kovalchuk, Yury; Konnerth, Arthur (September 2009). "Sparsification of neuronal activity in the visual cortex at eye-opening". Proceedings of the National Academy of Sciences. 106 (35): 15049–15054. Bibcode:2009PNAS..10615049R. doi:10.1073/pnas.0907660106. PMC 2736444. PMID 19706480.
- Pakan, Janelle MP; Lowe, Scott C; Dylda, Evelyn; Keemink, Sander W; Currie, Stephen P; Coutts, Christopher A; Rochefort, Nathalie L (23 August 2016). "Behavioral-state modulation of inhibition is context-dependent and cell type specific in mouse visual cortex". eLife. 5 e14985. doi:10.7554/eLife.14985. ISSN 2050-084X. PMC 5030095. PMID 27552056.
