= Henry Colecraft =

American biophysicist

Henry M. Colecraft
- Education: King's College London; University of Rochester
- Scientific career
- Workplaces: Johns Hopkins University
- Thesis: Signal transduction mechanisms underlying muscarinic receptor-mediated stimulation of the heartbeat in single cultured neonatal rat ventricular mycocytes (1995)

Henry M. Colecraft is an American Biophysicist, the John C. Dalton Professor and Associate Vice Chair of the Department of Physiology and Cellular Biophysics at Columbia University Irving Medical Center.

== Early life and education ==
Colecraft was born in Ghana. He moved to Boston as a child so his father could attend graduate school, and moved to England as a teenager, where he attended secondary school. was an undergraduate student in physiology at King's College London. He moved to the University of Rochester for his doctoral research, where he studied signal transduction mechanisms that impact muscarinic receptor mediated stimulation. He was a postdoc Johns Hopkins University, where he was recruited as an assistant professor. Here he established the Ion Channel Physiology & Disease Lab.

== Research and career ==
Colecraft was appointed associate professor at Johns Hopkins University in 2007. He looks to understand the molecular mechanisms that underpin ion channel regulation. In particular, Colecraft has studied ubiquitin, a protein that regulates ion channels. He created a biophysical tool he calls "enDubs"; GFP and YFP-targeted deubiquitinases. These are deubiquitinases where the catalytic domain is fused to fluorophore-specific nanobodies. He is also interested how mutations in ion channels can cause disease in the cardiovascular, neurological and respiratory systems.

== Select publications ==
- Henry M Colecraft; Badr Alseikhan; Shoji X Takahashi; et al. (2002). "Novel functional properties of Ca(2+) channel beta subunits revealed by their expression in adult rat heart cells". The Journal of Physiology. 541 (Pt 2): 435–452. doi:10.1113/jphysiol.2002.018515. PMC 2290333. PMID 12042350. Wikidata Q24642102.
- Ting-Ting Hong; James W P Smyth; Danchen Gao; et al. (2010). "BIN1 localizes the L-type calcium channel to cardiac T-tubules". PLOS Biology. 8 (2) e1000312. doi:10.1371/journal.pbio.1000312. PMC 2821894. PMID 20169111. Wikidata Q27324852.
- Yong Geng; Lidia Mosyak; Igor Kurinov; et al. (2016). "Structural mechanism of ligand activation in human calcium-sensing receptor". eLife. 5. doi:10.7554/elife.13662. PMC 4977154. PMID 27434672. Wikidata Q29465814.
