= Physiological Reports =

- Discipline: Physiology
- Language: English
- Edited by: Jo Adams

Publication details
- History: 2013–present
- Publisher: Wiley-Blackwell on behalf of The Physiological Society and the American Physiological Society
- Frequency: Upon acceptance
- Open access: Yes
- License: Creative Commons Attribution

Standard abbreviations
- ISO 4: Physiol. Rep.

Indexing
- CODEN: PRHEJ2
- ISSN: 2051-817X
- OCLC no.: 850253075

Links
- Journal homepage; Online access; Online archive; Journal page on publisher's website

Physiological Reports is a peer-reviewed open access online-only scientific journal covering original research in all areas of physiology. It is published by Wiley-Blackwell on behalf of The Physiological Society and the American Physiological Society. The journal was established in 2013. Susan Wray (University of Liverpool) was the first editor-in-chief until 2017 . As well as receiving direct submissions, the journal has manuscripts "cascaded" to it from the journals of its owner societies (American Journal of Physiology, Experimental Physiology, and The Journal of Physiology). Since 2015 it has also received papers cascaded by Acta Physiologica, a publication of the Scandinavian Physiological Society. The journal is abstracted and indexed in Index Medicus/MEDLINE/PubMed.
