= Pamela Shaw =

British neurologist

Dame Pamela Shaw DBE FMedSci
- Born: Pamela Jean Shaw; 1955 (age 70–71); Rothbury, Northumberland, England
- Education: University of Newcastle
- Awards: Wellcome Senior Fellowship in Clinical Science; Fellow of the Academy of Medical Sciences; Dame Commander of the Order of the British Empire; G. L. Brown Prize Lecture
- Scientific career
- Fields: Neurology
- Workplaces: University of Sheffield; National Institute for Health Research (NIHR) Sheffield Biomedical Research Centre

Dame Pamela Jean Shaw (born 1955) is a British consultant neurologist and professor of neurology at the University of Sheffield. She is the founder and director of the Sheffield Institute for Translational Neuroscience, and in 2019 was appointed to lead the National Institute for Health Research (NIHR) Sheffield Biomedical Research Centre.

== Early life and education ==
Shaw was born in Rothbury, Northumberland, England in 1955 and is one of four children. Her mother was a Nurse and her father was a Captain in the Merchant Navy. She has said due to his naval voyages, he did not meet her until she was 6 months old.

Shaw lived in Kuwait as a child due to her father's career and was a member of the Kuwait Brownies. Shaw has said she decided she wanted to go to medical school after a school trip to the local Hospital.. She attended the Anglo-American School in Kuwait but returned to Northumberland for Secondary School and attended a Boarding School.

In 1979 Shaw graduated with first class honours in Medicine from the University of Newcastle and was awarded several prizes during her undergraduate degree. She subsequently undertook further training in neurology at Newcastle, worked towards the award of Membership of the Royal Colleges of Physicians of the United Kingdom and was awarded an Doctor of Medicine degree in 1988. Her doctoral work was on the neurological and neuropsychological complications of coronary artery bypass surgery.

== Research and career ==
She specialises in the "molecular mechanisms of neurodegeneration and neuroprotection in disorders of the motor system (MND and HSP)".

Since 1991, long-term funding from the Wellcome Trust has supported her research group to study the source of neurodegenerative disorders of the human motor system. They have been able to implicate various subcellular pathways and cellular features in susceptibility. In addition, they have screened candidates for potential treatment for these disorders. This work contributed to evidence underpinning the use of riluzole in motor neurone disease.

In 1997 she was appointed Professor of Neurological Medicine at the University of Newcastle and in 2000 she moved to the University of Sheffield as Professor of Neurology. She developed training and research in clinical neuroscience at Sheffield, building on the excellent clinical expertise in the department. She is the founder and director of the Sheffield Institute for Translational Neuroscience, and in 2019 was appointed to lead the National Institute for Health Research (NIHR) Sheffield Biomedical Research Centre.

Shaw has been chair of the Clinical Research and Academic Committee of the Association of British Neurologists.

In August 2026, she was the guest for BBC Radio 4's Desert Island Discs. Her music choices included the "Hallelujah Chorus" from Handel's Messiah and Joni Mitchell's "Both Sides, Now".

== Awards ==
Shaw held a Wellcome Senior Fellowship in Clinical Science from 1991–2000 and she is currently a Senior Investigator at the NIHR. She was elected a Fellow of the Academy of Medical Sciences in 2007.

In 2014 she was made a Dame Commander of the Order of the British Empire.

In 2019 she was awarded the G. L. Brown prize lecture by The Physiological Society.

== Personal Life ==
She has a husband and a daughter.

She met her husband, Paul, at medical school.
