= David Paterson (physiologist) =

New Zealand-born British physiologist and academic (born 1959)

David J. Paterson MAE Hon FRSNZ
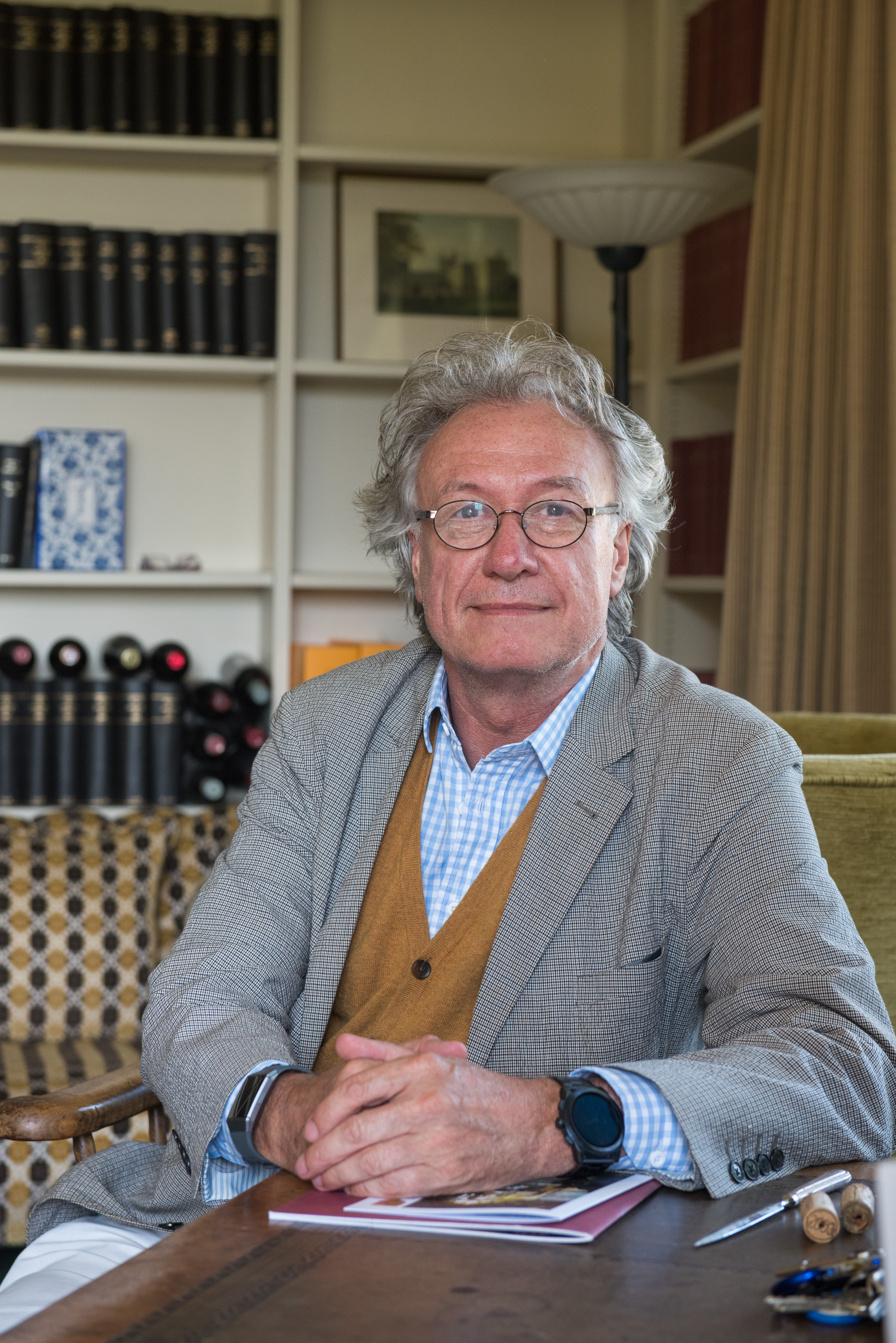
- Born: 21 April 1959 (age 67)
- Awards: Rolleston Memorial Prize (1989); GL Brown Prize Lecture (2000); Carl Ludwig Distinguished Lecturer (2018); Honorary Doctor of the University of Western Australia (HonDUniv) (2023); Honorary Doctor of Laws University of Otago (HonLLD) (2025)

Academic background
- Education: University of Otago; University of Western Australia; University of Oxford

Academic work
- Sub-discipline: Cardiac neurobiology

David James Paterson (born April 21, 1959) is a New Zealand-born British physiologist and academic. He is a Fellow of Merton College, Oxford and Professor of Cardiovascular Physiology in the Department of Physiology, Anatomy & Genetics at the University of Oxford where he was Head of Department from 2016-2026, (QS World ranked 1^{st} in Anatomy & Physiology for nine years during his tenure), and past president of The Physiological Society of the United Kingdom and Republic of Ireland.

Paterson is best known for his work in cardiac neurobiology, linking the nervous system to heart rhythm, which was featured in the 2012 BBC Four documentary Heart v Mind: What Makes Us Human?, and associated interviews on RNZ National Science programme Heart v Mind. In 2018 he co-authored with Neil Herring the text book Levick's Introduction to Cardiovascular Physiology, 6th edition.

== Early life and education ==
Paterson was born in Timaru, New Zealand on 21 April 1959. He attended Otago Boys' High School and the University of Otago before training as a secondary teacher. He was awarded a Master of Science degree in 1985 from the University of Western Australia, and won a Hackett scholarship to New College, Oxford and completed a DPhil thesis, in 1989, on the control of breathing and chemoreception from the University Laboratory of Physiology. In 2005, he was awarded a Doctor of Science degree by examination from the University of Western Australia.

== Career ==
Paterson was elected to a Junior Research Fellowship at Christ Church, Oxford from 1988 to 1991. He switched fields when appointed to a British Heart Foundation Lectureship in 1991 in cardiovascular physiology at Oxford. In 1994, he was made a University Lecturer in association with a Tutorial Fellowship at Merton College, Oxford, and then, in 1998, a Reader in Physiology and in 2002, Professor of Cardiovascular Physiology. In 2008 he was appointed Associate Head then Deputy Head and Vice Dean of the Division of Medical Sciences at Oxford (2008–16). In 2016, Paterson was then appointed Head of the Department of Physiology, Anatomy and Genetics at Oxford until 2026. From 2018-22 he was President-elect then President of The Physiological Society. During his tenure he rolled out a national blue plaque scheme in British and Irish Universities celebrating discovery in physiology and championed the awarding of Royal Charter of the Society. . Paterson was the editor-in-chief of Experimental Physiology from 2006 to 2011 and of The Journal of Physiology from 2011 to 2016. He is a Fellow of the Royal Society of Biology and in 2014 was elected an Honorary Fellow of The Royal Society of New Zealand. In 2016 he delivered the Brookhart Award Lecture in Oregon. He was elected as an inaugural Fellow of The Physiological Society in 2017. In 2018 he delivered the Carl Ludwig Distinguished Lecture for the American Physiological Society at Experimental Biology. In 2019 he was elected a Fellow of the American Physiological Society. In 2020 he was appointed as a core member of the UKRI-BBSRC Bioscience Advisory Panel for an Integrated Understanding of Health Strategy and in 2021 elected a member of Academia Europaea During 2021–22 he chaired the controversial 10-year review of Oxford's Employer-Justified Retirement Age (EJRA). The group made wide-ranging recommendations and concluded that the EJRA was justified for some academic grades based on one of the university's legitimate aims regarding equality and intergeneration fairness. All recommendations were accepted by Council and Congregation. In 2023 Paterson was made an Honorary Fellow of The Physiological Society and received an honorary degree from the University of Western Australia (Hon DUniv in Medical Sciences). In 2024 he was elected to the Academy of Fellows of the International Union of Physiological Sciences Fellows of IUPS Academy 2024 In 2025 he delivered the graduation address and was awarded an honorary Doctor of Laws from the University of Otago, New Zealand. . In the same year he was awarded the 5th Annual Robert Lieberman Distinguished Lecturership, University of Nebraska Medical Center.

=== Research ===
Paterson is best known for his studies on potassium, chemoreception and respiratory control, and more recently for his discovery linking peptides and the gaseous messenger nitric oxide to cyclic nucleotide coupled cardiac autonomic neurotransmission. His work has contributed to the understanding of how the nervous system modulates cardiac excitability in health and disease. Paterson leads a research team in the area of cardiac neurobiology. They are interested in how both branches of the cardiac autonomic nervous system communicate at the end organ level and established that oxidative stress plays a major role in uncoupling pre-synaptic and post synaptic signalling. The endogenous gas nitric oxide is a key intermediary in cardiac inter/intracellular signalling, where it regulates several ion channels that control cardiac excitability. His group has developed methods for targeting the enzyme involved in making nitric oxide-cGMP using a gene transfer approach involving cell specific viral vectors and FRET sensors to study the physiology of this messenger in normal and diseased hearts. More recently using human iPSC 2D and 3D organoid models of cardiac-neural regulation his team have discovered that a cardiac channelopathy is also a disease of the sympathetic neuron innervating the heart.
