= John H. Coote =

British physiologist

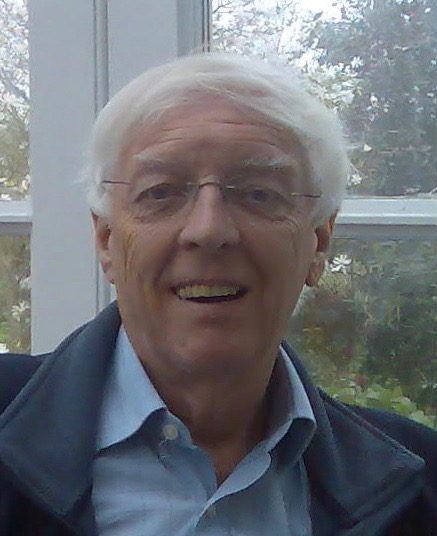
- Professor John Coote (2007)
- Born: 5 January 1936; London
- Died: 27 November 2017 (aged 81)
- Education: University College London
- Scientific career
- Fields: Physiology
- Workplaces: University of Birmingham

John Haven Coote FBPhS FRSB FRGS (5 January 1936 – 27 November 2017) was a British physiologist. He was the Bowman Professor of Physiology (1983–2003) then Professor Emeritus at the University of Birmingham. He was a visiting professor at University of Leicester and a Consultant in Applied Physiology, Royal Air Force Institute of Aviation Medicine.

He was a scientist interested in the autonomic control of the cardiovascular system with a special interest in exercise and high-altitude physiology, and was a keen mountain-climber.

== Biography ==
John H. Coote was born in London, the son of a minister in the Pentecostal Church, who had an electrical engineering background. He was evacuated during the second World War to South Wales where his mother's family were miners. After the cessation of hostilities Coote returned to London and attended Enfield Grammar School. He won a place to read Medicine at University College London in 1954, and was called up for national service shortly afterwards. It was likely that he would have been able to defer time away from his studies, but on the advice of his father Coote chose to register as a pacifist and became a conscientious objector. He was sentenced to three years agricultural and hospital work. In 1958 when Coote returned to Medicine, his passion for physiology developed leading to an intercalated BSc in 1962 and a PhD in 1964 under Charles B. B. Downman at the Royal Free Hospital. Although Coote briefly returned to his medical studies in 1964, the draw of research was too strong and he was appointed to a lectureship in 1967 in Birmingham.

== Climbing ==
University brought with it a passion for climbing, the University of London Graduate Mountaineering Club was in its infancy in the 1950s and the young John Coote was an early member. In the late 50s and 60s Coote climbed extensively in Britain and the European Alps, and he used this experience to lead outdoor activities with the Reverend Bob Shepton and the Cambridge University Mission. A thirst for exploration took him on expeditions to Morocco, Kenya, Greenland, and the Andes. The early 1970s saw Coote barely survive an accident near the summit of Pico Bolivar that costs the lives of both his climbing companions but it also brought with it marriage and children. Coote's passion in climbing and mountaineering started to overlap with his physiological interests in the 1980s and he undertook expeditions to Rupina La (Nepal), Karakorum (Pakistan), Cerro de Pasco (Peru) and Everest (Nepal) to study the effects of high altitude on human performance.

== Science ==
Coote was an autonomic physiology who maintained active hands on research for nearly 60yrs until his sudden death. He was particularly known for:

- how exercise increase blood pressure
- how the brain influences the heart
  - how the vagus nerve influence in the heart, which is of particular relevance for the therapeutic field of vagal nerve stimulation
- how the brain influence kidney function, particularly in the context of hypertension and kidney failure
- early work on the how changes in breathing could affect the function of the heart and the rest of the cardiovascular system.
- the benefits of acetazolamide prophylaxis to reduce the incidence of altitude sickness, as part of the Birmingham Medical Research Expeditionary Society.

=== Editorial work ===
Coote was chairman of the Editorial Board of Experimental Physiology from 2000 to 2006, and a Guest editor for Autonomic Neuroscience: Basic and Clinical.

=== Awards ===
- Paton Prize of the Physiological Society (2005)
- Carl Ludwig Distinguished Lectureship of the American Physiological Society (2003)

== Timeline ==
Substantive posts include:

- Lecturer in Department of Physiology, University of Birmingham (1967), Senior Lecturer (1970), Reader (1977)
- Professor of Physiology, Bowman Professor and Head of Department of Physiology, University of Birmingham (1983-2003)
- Head of School of Basic Medical sciences, University of Birmingham 1988-91
- Emeritus Professor 2003-17
- Visiting Professor Tokyo 1974, Chicago 1988, Shanghai 1989, Heidelberg 1992, Nankai 2004
- Visiting Professor in cardiology, Glenfield Hospital, University of Leicester (2003–17), in biomedical sciences at University of Warwick (2003-?)
- Honorary consultant in physiology NHS Dudley 1978-82
- Chairman of the Ethics Committee for DERA and QinetiQ 1998-2008
- Council of the British Heart Foundation 1998-2003
- Defence Science Advisory Council 2003-?
- Consultant in Applied Physiology RAF
- Fellow of Royal Society of Biology (1988), Fellow of Royal Geographical Society (2004), Honorary Fellow of British Pharmacological Society (2012)

== Publications ==
High-impact publications (more than 100 citations) include:

- Coote, JH; Hilton, SM; Perez-Gonzalez, JF (July 1971). "The reflex nature of the pressor response to muscular exercise". The Journal of Physiology. 215 (3): 789–804. doi:10.1113/jphysiol.1971.sp009498. PMC 1331914. PMID 5090995.
- Coote, JH; Macleod, VH (September 1974). "The influence of bulbospinal monoaminergic pathways on sympathetic nerve activity". The Journal of Physiology. 241 (2): 453–75. doi:10.1113/jphysiol.1974.sp010666. PMC 1331042. PMID 4548438.
- Taylor, EW; Jordan, D; Coote, JH (July 1999). "Central control of the cardiovascular and respiratory systems and their interactions in vertebrates". Physiological Reviews. 79 (3): 855–916. doi:10.1152/physrev.1999.79.3.855. PMID 10390519. S2CID 11155853.
- Pyner, S; Coote, JH (2000). "Identification of branching paraventricular neurons of the hypothalamus that project to the rostroventrolateral medulla and spinal cord". Neuroscience. 100 (3): 549–56. doi:10.1016/S0306-4522(00)00283-9. PMID 11098118. S2CID 23769898.
- Coote, JH; Sato, Y (June 1977). "Reflex regulation of sympathetic activity in the spontaneously hypertensive rat". Circulation Research. 40 (6): 571–7. doi:10.1161/01.RES.40.6.571. PMID 858180.
