= Richard W. Tsien =

American neuroscientist

Richard Tsien
- Born: Richard Winyu Tsien 錢永佑; 3 March 1945 (age 81); Dading, Guizhou, China
- Education: Massachusetts Institute of Technology (BS, MS); University of Oxford (DPhil)
- Spouse: Julia Shiang
- Children: 3
- Father: Hsue-Chu Tsien
- Relatives: Roger Y. Tsien (brother)
- Scientific career
- Awards: Member of the National Academy of Sciences (1997); Physiological Society Annual Review Prize Lecture (2014)
- Fields: Electrical engineering Neurobiology
- Workplaces: New York University Medical Center; Stanford University
- Thesis: The kinetics of conductance changes in heart cells (1970)
- Doctoral advisors: Denis Noble
- Other academic advisors: Julian Jack, Jean Banister
- Doctoral students: Karl Deisseroth
- Website: med.nyu.edu/faculty/richard-tsien
- Website: https://med.nyu.edu/research/tsien-lab/

Richard W. Tsien
- Traditional Chinese: 錢永佑
- Simplified Chinese: 钱 永 佑
Transcriptions
Standard Mandarin
- Hanyu Pinyin: Qián Yǒngyòu

Richard Winyu Tsien (born 3 March 1945), is a Chinese-born American electrical engineer and neurobiologist. He is the Druckenmiller Professor of Neuroscience, former Chair of the Department of Physiology and Neuroscience, and former Director of the Neuroscience Institute at New York University Medical Center, and also an emeritus faculty member of Stanford University School of Medicine.

== Early life and education ==
Tsien was born in Dading, Guizhou, China and is a descendant of King of Wuyue Qian Liu (Tsien Liu). Soon after his birth, Tsien's family moved to the United States. Tsien received his Bachelor of Science degree in 1965 and Master of Science degree in 1966, both in electrical engineering from the Massachusetts Institute of Technology. Tsien then won a Rhodes Scholarship and went to study in the UK at Wadham College, Oxford, from 1966 to 1969. Tsien obtained a Doctor of Philosophy (DPhil) degree in biophysics from the University of Oxford in 1970.

== Career and research ==
From 1968 to 1970, Tsien was a Weir Junior Research Fellow at University College, Oxford. From 1969 to 1970, Tsien was a teaching fellow at Balliol College, Oxford.

In 1970, Tsien went back to the United States, and became an assistant professor in the Department of Physiology at Yale University School of Medicine from 1970 to 1974. From 1974 to 1979, Tsien was an associate professor in the same department, and was promoted to full professor in 1979.

In 1988, Tsien went to Stanford and founded the Stanford University Department of Molecular and Cellular Physiology, where he also served as the first chairman. From 1991 to 2001, Tsien was the Silvio Conte Director - National Institutes of Mental Health Center for Neuroscience Research. From 1988 to 2011, Tsien was the George D. Smith Professor at the Department of Molecular and Cellular Physiology. From 2000 to 2011, Tsien served as Co-Director for the Stanford Brain Research Center.

Tsien did important work on calcium channels, their mechanisms and roles in cell signaling pathways. Tsien's research also helps us understand the long-term plasticity of synapses.

From 1987 to 1988, Tsien served as president of the Society of General Physiologists. In August 2000, Tsien also served the Section Chair of Neurobiology of the United States National Academy of Sciences.

=== Selected honors & awards ===
- 1985, Kenneth S. Cole Award (for contributions to membrane biophysics)
- 1991, 1995, 1999, Kaiser Award for Outstanding and Innovative Teaching, from Stanford University
- 1993, Magnes Prize, from Hebrew University, Jerusalem
- 1994, elected to the United States Institute of Medicine
- 1996, awardee "Perspectives in Physiology: Walter B. Cannon Memorial Lecture", from the American Physiological Society
- 1996, elected to the Academia Sinica
- 1997, elected a member of the United States National Academy of Sciences (NAS)
- 1998, elected to the American Academy of Arts and Sciences
- 2000, elected Fellow of the Biophysical Society
- 2014 Bard Lecture, Johns Hopkins University

== Personal life ==
Tsien's youngest brother Roger Y. Tsien, a biochemist, won the 2008 Nobel Prize in Chemistry.
