= Elisabeth Klein =

Hungarian-born Danish classical pianist (1911–2004)

Elisabeth Klein (23 July 1911 – 11 October 2004) was a Hungarian-Danish pianist.

== Biography ==
Elisabeth Klein was born in Trencsén (now Slovakia) and lived in Budapest, Hungary from the age of 3. At any early age she demonstrated a strong aptitude for playing the piano. After graduating from the Franz Liszt Academy of Music in Budapest, she studied privately with Béla Bartók from 1934–1936.

She came to Denmark at the outbreak of Second World War and remained there in Copenhagen for the longest part of her life. She married Jørgen Petersen (1916–1986), a Royal Danish Naval Officer, on 21 December 1941, and their first son, Ole Holger Petersen, was born in 1943. After the War, during which Jørgen was exiled in Scotland, their second son, Nils Holger Petersen, was born in 1946. The family spent some years stationed with NATO in Oslo, Norway, and in Kiel, West Germany.

Elisabeth Klein worked for many years with the Royal Danish Opera in Copenhagen, the Royal Danish Academy of Music in Copenhagen, Denmark and the Norwegian Academy of Music, Oslo, Norway.

From her early interest in Contemporary music in the 1960s, she became a particular champion of and specialist in the performance of Contemporary Scandinavian piano music.

She also had an interest in International Women's Contemporary music. She performed concerts and recordings throughout Scandinavia, many countries in Europe, U.S., Israel, China, and Mexico. Her discography includes works of Bartók, Berg, Stockhausen and many contemporary Scandinavian composers. A good number of works for piano were also dedicated to her by various composers.

In 1980 after her husband retired as a rear admiral from the Royal Danish Navy, they moved to Oslo, Norway where Elisabeth Klein continued to teach at the Norwegian Academy of Music until the age of 70. She spend her final years in Liverpool, UK still actively performing and teaching piano.

Elisabeth Klein was awarded the Music Prize of Danish Radio in 1966, made an honorary artist of the Norwegian Composers Association in 1976, and became an honorary member of Women in Music in 1992.
