= Denis Noble =

British biologist (born 1936)

Denis Noble CBE FRS FMedSci MRCP MAE
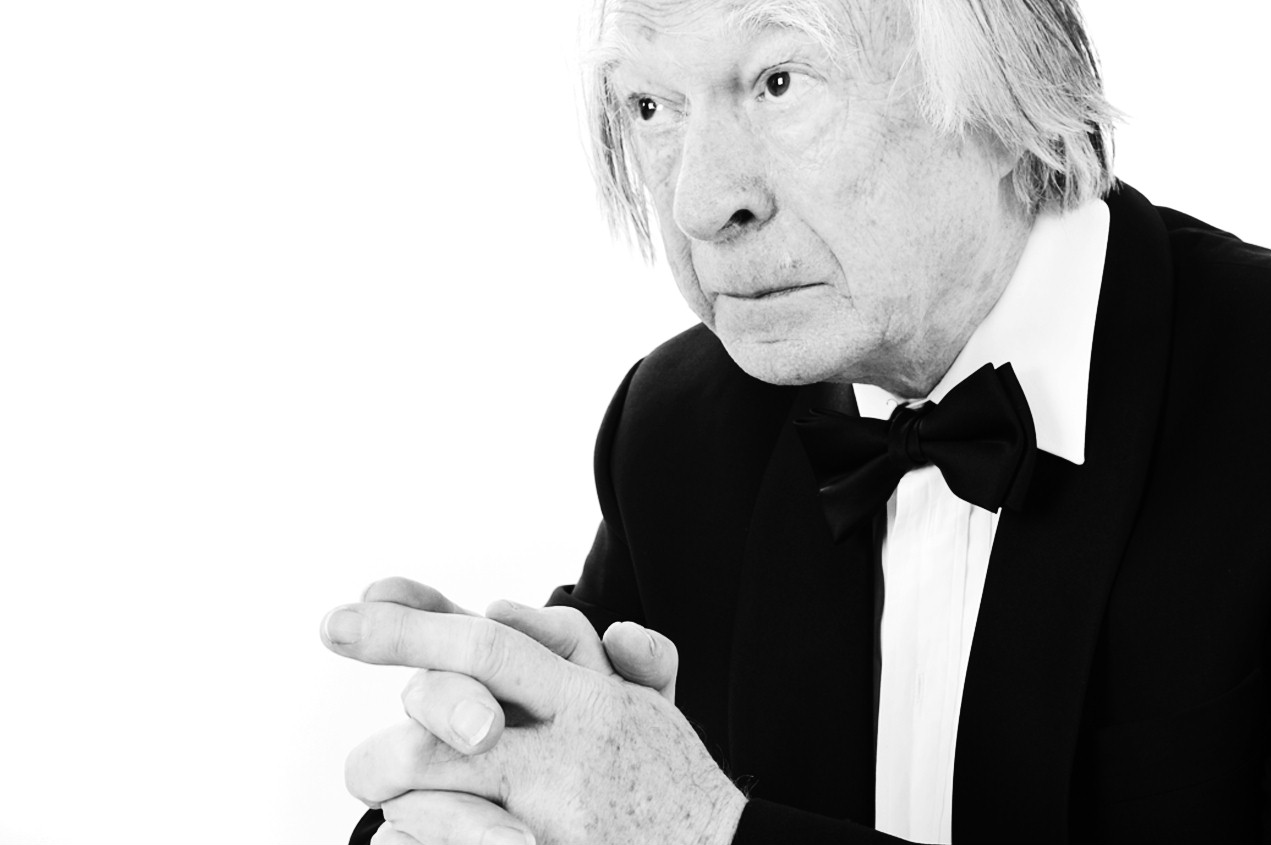
- Born: 16 November 1936 (age 90)
- Education: Emanuel School; University College London (BSc, MA, PhD)
- Spouse: Susan Jennifer Barfield (m. 1965; died 2015)
- Children: 2
- Awards: Physiological Society Annual Review Prize Lecture (1983); Lomonosov Gold Medal (2022)
- Scientific career
- Fields: Systems biology; Physiology; Computational biology; Evolutionary biology
- Workplaces: University of Oxford
- Thesis: Ion conductance of cardiac muscle (1961)
- Doctoral advisor: Otto Hutter
- Doctoral students: Richard W. Tsien
- Website: web.archive.org/web/20210120095348/https://www.denisnoble.com/

Denis Noble (born 16 November 1936) CBE FRS FMedSci MRCP MAE is a British physiologist and biologist who held the Burdon Sanderson Chair of Cardiovascular Physiology at the University of Oxford from 1984 to 2004 and was appointed professor emeritus and co-director of computational physiology. Since 2025, he has served as a Distinguished Chair Professor at Daegu-Gyeongbuk Institute of Science and Technology (DGIST).

In 2014, Noble established The Third Way of Evolution (TWE) project with James A. Shapiro which rejects natural selection as the primary cause of evolution and predicts that the entire framework of the modern synthesis of evolution will be replaced, though these claims have not gained support from mainstream evolutionary biology, and TWE has been described as a "fringe movement".

== Education ==
Noble was privately educated at Emanuel School followed by University College London (UCL). In 1958 he began his investigations into the mechanisms of heartbeat. This led to two seminal papers in Nature in 1960 giving the first experimentally-based mathematical simulation of the electrical rhythm of the heart. In 1961 he obtained his PhD working under the supervision of Otto Hutter at UCL.

This work was subsequently developed extensively with Richard Tsien in 1975, and with Dario DiFrancesco in 1985, forming the foundations of modern electrophysiology of the heart. The 1985 article was included in 2015 in the Royal Society's 350-year celebration of the publication of Philosophical Transactions.

== Career and research ==
Noble began his career as an assistant lecturer in physiology at University College London, also serving as vice-warden at the University of London. In 1963, he joined Balliol College, Oxford as a fellow and tutor, later becoming head of its graduate centre and vice-master.

From 1984 to 2004, he served as Burdon Sanderson Professor of Cardiovascular Physiology at the University of Oxford and a professorial fellow at Balliol College, Oxford. He subsequently became emeritus professor and continued as director of computational physiology. He also held appointments at Xi'an Jiaotong University and Osaka University.

Alongside his academic work, he led major research programmes, co-founded Save British Science, and served as editor-in-chief of Progress in Biophysics and Molecular Biology. He later served as president of the International Union of Physiological Sciences and held editorial roles at Interface Focus and the Oxford Longevity Project.

Noble's research focuses on using computer models of biological organs and organ systems to interpret function from the molecular level to the whole organism. Together with international collaborators, his team has used supercomputers to create the first virtual organ, the virtual heart.

As secretary-general of the International Union of Physiological Sciences 1993–2001, he played a major role, together with Peter Hunter, in launching the Physiome Project, an international project to use computer simulations to create the quantitative physiological models necessary to interpret the genome, and he was elected president of the IUPS at its world congress in Kyoto in 2009.

Noble is also a philosopher of biology, with many publications in journals and books of philosophy. In a review of The Music of Life, a book discussing systems biology, a colleague has stated that "by challenging the foundations of current biological sciences, he questions the central dogma, its unidirectional view of information flow, and its imposition of a bottom-up methodology for research in the life sciences."

The introduction to the 2023 book Evolution "On Purpose": Teleonomy in Living Systems, co-edited by Noble along with Addy Pross, Peter Corning, Stuart Kauffman, James A. Shapiro and Richard I. Vane-Wright, concludes with the claim that "Teleonomy in living systems is not, after all, only "apparent". It is a fundamental fact of life."

=== Reductionism ===
Noble's 2006 book The Music of Life examines some of the basic aspects of systems biology, and is critical of the ideas of genetic determinism and genetic reductionism. He points out that there are many examples of feedback loops and "downward causation" in biology, and that it is not reasonable to privilege one level of understanding over all others.

Noble argues that "the paradigms for genetic causality in biological systems are seriously confused" and that "The metaphors that served us well during the molecular biological phase of recent decades have limited or even misleading impacts in the multilevel world of systems biology. New paradigms are needed if we are to succeed in unravelling multifactorial genetic causation at higher levels of physiological function and so to explain the phenomena that genetics was originally about."

=== The Third Way of Evolution (TWE) ===
Noble has rejected natural selection as the primary mechanism of evolution, contrary to the longstanding consensus of evolutionary biologists, and has called for an extended evolutionary synthesis, known as The Third Way of Evolution (TWE), as a replacement for the modern synthesis.

He has argued that from research in epigenetics, acquired characteristics can be inherited and in contrast to the modern synthesis, genetic change is "far from random" and not always gradual. He has also claimed that the central dogma of molecular biology has been broken as an "embodiment of the Weismann Barrier", and a new synthesis will integrate research from physiology with evolutionary biology.

Noble and James A. Shapiro established The Third Way of Evolution (TWE) project in 2014. The TWE which is also known as the "Integrated Synthesis" shares many similarities with the extended evolutionary synthesis but is more radical in its claims. The TWE consists of a group of researchers who provide a "Third Way" alternative to creationism and the modern synthesis. The TWE predicts that the modern synthesis will be replaced with an entirely new evolutionary framework. Similar to the extended evolutionary synthesis (EES), advocates of TWE cite examples of developmental bias, genetic assimilation, niche construction, non-genetic inheritance, phenotypic plasticity and other evolutionary processes. The concept of natural genetic engineering, a process which Shapiro proposed to account for novelty created in biological evolution, is also important for the TWE. The difference between the extended synthesis and the TWE is that the latter calls for an entire replacement of the modern synthesis rather than an extension.

In 2023, evolutionary biologist Erik Svensson commented that "to date, there are few leading evolutionary biologists who have openly embraced the TWE" and it is unlikely that an entire replacement of the modern synthesis will occur as there has been little visibility of such a forthcoming paradigm shift during the past decade, and described TWE as a "fringe movement outside mainstream evolutionary biology" that is ideologically adjacent to Lamarckism. Svensson described Noble's claims as based on "biased and historically misleading characterizations" of the modern evolutionary synthesis, conflating it with both the earlier "Neo-Darwinism", as well as later developments such as the selfish gene hypothesis. Svensson also criticised Noble's claim that genetic mutations were directed and purposeful, contrary to the mainstream consensus that mutations are entirely random. Noble had, in Svensson's view, failed to present a viable alternative to natural selection, with Svensson stating it was "unclear if [Noble's proposed mechanism for evolution] is even a scientific one".

=== Publications ===
Noble has published over 700 articles in peer reviewed scientific journals, including Nature, Science, Proceedings of the National Academy of Sciences of the United States of America, Journal of Physiology, Progress in Biophysics & Molecular Biology, and many articles in the national press. He is the (co-)author and/or editor of many books, including:

- The Initiation of the Heartbeat. Oxford: Clarendon Press. 1975. ISBN 978-0-19-857154-4. OCLC 569495557 – via Internet Archive.
- Jack, J. J. B.; Noble, Denis; Tsien, R. W. (1975). Electric Current Flow in Excitable Cells. Oxford: Clarendon Press. ISBN 978-0-19-857365-4. OCLC 1633990.
- Noble, Denis; Powell, Trevor (1987). Electrophysiology of Single Cardiac Cells. London: Academic Press. ISBN 978-0-12-520040-0. OCLC 20692607.
- Allen, T. Jeff A.; Noble, Denis; Reuter, Harald (1989). Sodium-Calcium Exchange. Oxford [England]: Oxford University Press. ISBN 978-0-19-854735-8. OCLC 610553885 – via Internet Archive.
- Noble, Denis; Earm, Yung E. (1993). Ionic Channels and Effect of Taurine on the Heart. Developments in Cardiovascular Medicine. Vol. 141. Boston, MA: Springer US. doi:10.1007/978-1-4615-3074-9. ISBN 978-1-4613-6342-2. OCLC 852789046.
- Boyd, C. A. R.; Noble, Denis (1993). The Logic of life : the challenge of integrative physiology. Oxford: Oxford University Press. ISBN 978-0-19-262417-8. OCLC 27975536.
- Noble, Denis; Vincent, Jean Didier; Ádám, György (1997). The Ethics of Life. Paris: UNESCO. ISBN 978-92-3-103422-0. OCLC 39358856.
- The Music of Life: Biology beyond the Genome. Oxford University PressOxford. 8 June 2006. doi:10.1093/oso/9780199295739.001.0001. ISBN 978-0-19-929573-9. OCLC 1406782814. Partial preview from Google Books.
- The Selected Papers of Denis Noble CBE FRS: A Journey in Physiology Towards Enlightenment. London, Singapore: Imperial College Press; Distributed by World Scientific Publishing. 2012. ISBN 978-1-84816-842-8. OCLC 769546978.
- Noble, Denis (2017). Dance to the tune of life: biological relativity. Cambridge; New York: Cambridge University Press. ISBN 978-1-107-17624-9.
- Edelstein, Larry; Smythies, John R.; Quesenberry, Peter J.; Noble, Denis; et al., eds. (2019). "Exomes, gemmuls, pangenesis and Darwin". Exosomes: a Clinical Compendium. San Diego: Elsevier Science & Technology. ISBN 978-0-12-816054-1. OCLC 1127115445. Partial preview from Google Books.
- Montefiore, Alan; Noble, Denis, eds. (2023). "Scientific Introduction," "Intentional Action and Physiology," and "What do Intentions do?". Goals, No Goals and Own Goals: A Debate on Goal-Directed and Intentional Behaviour. London: Routledge. doi:10.4324/978100318555 (inactive 13 August 2026). ISBN 978-1-000-41499-8. OCLC 1420169188.
- Rattigan, Benedict; Noble, Denis; et al., eds. (2023). "The Interdependence of Order and Disorder: How Complexity Arises in the Living and the Inanimate Universe". The Language of Symmetry. Boca Raton: CRC Press, Taylor & Francis Group. ISBN 978-1-003-30698-6. OCLC 1350435643. Partial preview from Google Books.
- Noble, Raymond; Noble, Denis (2023). Understanding Living Systems. Cambridge, United Kingdom: Cambridge University Press. ISBN 978-1-009-27739-6. OCLC 1378603076.
- Noble, Denis; Noble, Raymond (2023). "How Purposive Agency Became Banned from Evolutionary Biology". In Corning, Peter A.; Kauffman, Stuart A.; Noble, Denis; et al. (eds.). Evolution "On Purpose": Teleonomy in Living Systems. Cambridge, Massachusetts: The MIT Press. ISBN 978-0-262-37601-3. OCLC 1348644515. Partial preview from Google Books.
- Sloan Wilson, David; Barham, James A.; Noble, Denis (2025). Is neo-Darwinism enough? the Noble-Wilson dialogue on evolution. Lexington: Inkwell Press. ISBN 979-8-9917040-2-1.
- Noble, Denis (2026). The pacemaker channels of the heart: from reductionism to systems biology. London: World Scientific Publishing Europe Ltd. ISBN 978-1-80061-811-4.

=== Awards and honours ===
Noble's major invited lectures include the Darwin Lecture for the British Association in 1966, the Nahum Lecture at Yale University in 1977 and the Ueda lecture at Tokyo University in 1985 and 1990. He was President of the Medical Section of the British Science Association 1991–92. Many further invited lectures during his election as Secretary-General (1993–2001) and President (2009–2017) of IUPS.

In 1979 he was elected a Fellow of the Royal Society (FRS). His nomination for the Royal Society reads:

Distinguished for the discovery of slowly activated potassium currents in the heart and a quantitative analysis of their role in controlling repolarization and pacemaker activity; the discovery of the ionic mechanisms by which adrenaline increases heart rate. He has shown that therapeutic levels of cardiac glycosides may increase, rather than decrease, potassium gradients in the heart, and has published an analytical treatment of membrane excitation theory and cable theory that provides a modern basis for the concepts of safety factor, liminal length, excitation time constants and the phenomenon of repetitive firing.

Noble was elected an Honorary Member of the Royal College of Physicians (MRCP) in 1988 and an Honorary Fellow in 1994, an Honorary Member of the American Physiological Society in 1996 and of the Physiological Society of Japan in 1998. In 1989 he was elected a Member of the Academia Europaea (MAE). In 1998, he was also a founding Fellow of the Academy of Medical Sciences (FMedSci). In 1998 he was appointed Commander of the British Empire (CBE). In 2021 he was elected a Fellow of the International Union of Physiological Sciences (IUPS) Academy. In 2022 he was elected a Fellow of The Linnean Society (FLS).

Noble has honorary doctorates from the University of Sheffield (2004), the Université de Bordeaux (2005) and the University of Warwick (2008).

Noble is an Honorary Foreign Member of the Académie Royale de Médecine de Belgique (1993), of the Istituto Lombardo Accademia di Scienze e Lettere, and received the Pavlov Medal of the Russian Academy of Sciences (2004). In 2022 he was elected Foreign Member of the Russian Academy of Sciences and was also awarded the Lomonosov Gold Medal.

In 2011, Alison MacLeod's story, "The Heart of Denis Noble", featuring a fictionalised version of Denis Noble recovering from a heart attack, was shortlisted for the BBC National Short Story Award.

== Personal life ==
Noble was born in London in 1936 to tailors George and Ethel Noble.

He plays classical guitar and sings Occitan troubadour and folk songs (Oxford Trobadors). In addition to English, he has lectured in French, Italian, Japanese and Korean.
