= Kim Barrett =

Research physiologist

Kim Elaine Barrett
- Education: University College London
- Scientific career
- Thesis: Studies on the functional heterogeneity of mast cells (1982)
- Doctoral advisor: Fred Pearce

Kim Elaine Barrett is a research physiologist, specialising in digestive disorders such as inflammatory bowel disease. She was Distinguished Professor of Medicine and Dean of the Graduate Division at University of California, San Diego before moving to her current position as Vice Dean for Research and Distinguished Professor of Physiology and Membrane Biology in the School of Medicine at University of California, Davis in 2021. She is the Editor-in-Chief of The Journal of Physiology (2016–2022 and 2023-present), and is a Past-President of the American Physiological Society.

== Education and career ==
Kim is a native of the United Kingdom and earned her BSc in Medicinal Chemistry and her PhD in Biological Chemistry, both from University College London in 1979 and 1982 respectively. She was a post-doctoral fellow at the National Institute for Allergy and Infectious Diseases (Bethesda, MD) in the laboratory of Dean Metcalfe before moving to the University of California San Diego in 1985. She rose to the rank of Distinguished Professor of Medicine and also served two terms as Dean of the Graduate Division there. From 2020–21, she additionally served as the rotating Director of the Division of Graduate Education in the Education and Human Resources Directorate of the National Science Foundation in Alexandria, VA. In November 2021, she became Vice-Dean for Research and Distinguished Professor of Physiology and Membrane Biology at the University of California Davis School of Medicine.

Her research focuses on the transport and barrier properties of the gastrointestinal epithelium and how these are deranged in the setting of various disease processes. Her work is relevant to the understanding of diarrheal diseases, particularly those caused by infectious agents such as Salmonella, and also to the mechanism of action of probiotics. She has also been interested in topics of diversity and inclusion in graduate education and in academic settings more broadly.

== Selected publications ==
She is the lead author for Ganong's Review of Medical Physiology (McGraw-Hill), currently in its 26th edition, and sole author of Gastrointestinal Physiology, also published by McGraw-Hill. Other highly-cited publications include:

- Barrett, Kim E.; Keely, Stephen J. (1 March 2000). "Chloride Secretion by the Intestinal Epithelium: Molecular Basis and Regulatory Aspects". Annual Review of Physiology. 62 (1): 535–572. doi:10.1146/annurev.physiol.62.1.535. ISSN 0066-4278. PMID 10845102.
- Resta-Lenert, S.; Barrett, K. E. (1 July 2003). "Live probiotics protect intestinal epithelial cells from the effects of infection with enteroinvasive Escherichia coli (EIEC)". Gut. 52 (7): 988–997. doi:10.1136/gut.52.7.988. ISSN 0017-5749. PMC 1773702. PMID 12801956.
- Resta–Lenert, Silvia; Barrett, Kim E. (March 2006). "Probiotics and Commensals Reverse TNF-α– and IFN-γ–Induced Dysfunction in Human Intestinal Epithelial Cells". Gastroenterology. 130 (3): 731–746. doi:10.1053/j.gastro.2005.12.015. ISSN 0016-5085. PMID 16530515.

== Awards ==
She has received numerous honours for her research, teaching, mentoring and service activities. For example, she received the degree of Doctor of Medical Science, honoris causa, from Queen's University Belfast in 2004, and the Bodil Schmidt-Nielsen Distinguished Scientist and Mentor Award from the American Physiological Society in 2012. She was also the 2015 Bayliss-Starling Prize Lecturer of The Physiological Society. In 2021, she received the Distinguished Achievement Award in Basic Science from the American Gastroenterological Association. She was also recognized in 2022 as an Honorary Fellow of The Physiological Society.
