= Anant Parekh =

British physiologist

The Honourable Anant Parekh FRS FMedSci MAE
- Born: Anant B. Parekh; Kingston upon Hull
- Education: Hymers College
- Alma mater: University of Oxford
- Scientific career
- Fields: Physiology
- Institutions: Max Planck Institute for Biophysical Chemistry; University of Oxford
- Thesis: Stimulus-contraction coupling in circular smooth muscle of guinea-pig stomach (1991)
- Doctoral advisor: Alison Brading
- Website: dpag.ox.ac.uk/anant-parekh

Anant B. Parekh is a British physiologist who is professor of Physiology at the University of Oxford and a Fellow of Merton College, Oxford.

== Education ==
Parekh was a student at Hymers College and University College, Oxford. He was awarded a Doctor of Philosophy degree by the University of Oxford in 1991 for research on smooth muscle supervised by Alison Brading. He carried out postdoctoral research at the Max Planck Institute for biophysical Chemistry (Goettingen) in the laboratory of Nobel Laureate Erwin Neher, working with Walter Stuehmer and then Reinhold Penner.

== Career and research ==
Parekh's research investigates the physiology of Calcium signalling and Calcium release activated channels (CRACs). He investigates how cells communicate with one another, with an emphasis on how the ubiquitous intracellular signalling messenger calcium controls biological functions such as secretion, energy production and gene expression.

Parekh's research investigates how aberrant calcium signals can contribute to ill health in humans, including allergies and asthma. Using various cell model systems and human tissue, he studies the physiology, cell biology and biochemistry of store-operated calcium channel proteins. Opening of these channels leads to calcium entry into the cell from the blood, triggering important physiological responses. Too much or too little calcium entry can lead to disease and tissue damage which makes the Calcium release activated channels (CRAC) promising biological targets for drug discovery.

=== Awards and honours ===
Parekh was elected a Fellow of the Royal Society (FRS) in 2019. He was also elected member of Academia Europaea (MAE) in 2002 and a Fellow of the Academy of Medical Sciences (FMedSci) in 2012. He was awarded the George Lindor Brown prize lecture by The Physiological Society in 2012.

== Personal life ==
Parekh is the youngest of three sons of Labour peer Bhikhu Parekh, Lord Parekh, all of whom gained scholarships to study at the University of Oxford.
