= Charles Lovatt Evans =

British physiologist (1884–1968)

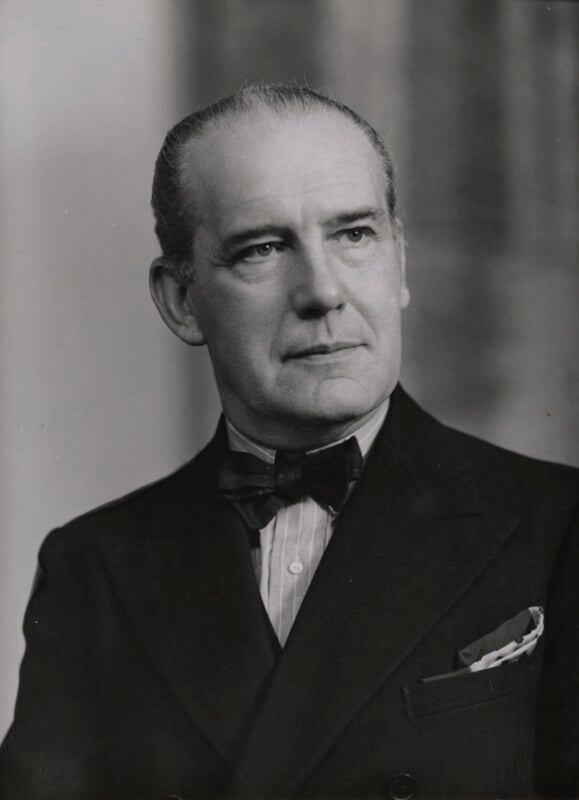
Evans in 1949

Sir Charles Arthur Lovatt Evans FRS (8 July 1884 – 29 August 1968) was a British physiologist who was vice-president of the Royal Society.

Charles Arthur Lovatt Evans was born in Birmingham, the son of Charles Evans, a piano and violin teacher.

== Education ==
Evans attended the Birmingham Municipal Technical School, and then sat as an external candidate for the University of London B.Sc. Immediately after the examination in 1911 he was appointed a Sharpey Scholar in the Physiology Department of University College, sponsored by Professor Ernest Starling.

He subsequently received M.R.C.S., L.R.C.P degrees from University College Hospital, in 1916. He then joined the Royal Army Medical Corps, and supervised anti-gas training in several units.

== Scientific career ==
On demobilization in 1918 he was appointed to the Chair of Physiology and Pharmacology in Leeds University, and in 1919 to the Chair of Physiology at St Bartholomew's Hospital Medical College; that year he also joined the National Institute for Medical Research.

== Honours ==
In 1911, he became a member of the Physiological Society and of the just-formed Biochemical Society. He was knighted in 1951.
