= Rachel Tribe =

British physiologist

- Education: University of London, UK
- Scientific career
- Fields: reproductive physiology
- Workplaces: University of Maryland, USA :King's College, London, UK

Rachel Tribe is a British academic who is the Professor of Maternal and Perinatal Sciences at King's College London working on translational research to improve the outcome of pregnancy.

== Education ==
Rachel Marie Tribe studied for her BSc degree at University of Sheffield in Special Dual Honours Physiology and Zoology. She was subsequently awarded a PhD from the University of London for research into dietary salt intake, sodium transport, and bronchial reactivity while working at St. Thomas's Hospital.

== Career ==
Tribe undertook post-doctoral research at the University of Maryland, Baltimore, USA into the regulation of intracellular calcium levels within smooth muscle. After returning to the UK, she was employed at King's College, London.

She has developed research programmes that aim to increase understanding of the physiology associated with pregnancy and the female reproductive tract so as to improve the outcome of preterm births and other problems that can arise during pregnancy. One specific aim is to identify biomarkers that can predict preterm birth. Her research group focuses on aspects of ion transport, the immune system and the microbiome. The consequence of interactions of the microbiome of the vagina during pregnancy is an area of particular interest that may lead to tests to screen for the risk of premature birth. The way in which the microbiome of the gut develops in infants after birth, and whether this can be related to health is another area. Her research group collaborates with others in the UK as well as with researchers in countries such as the USA, Australia, Kenya, Mozambique and India. She is a member of the PRECISE network that aims to improve the outcomes of pregnancy in the UK and Africa through a shared research programme.

Tribe has also been part of several collaborations that are trying to develop apps that can be used by pregnant women or doctors to help decide if there is a risk of a preterm birth. One of these is EQUIPTT and another is QUiPP.

== Awards ==
In 2016 Tribe was awarded the G L Brown Prize Lecture by the Physiological Society. She is now a Trustee and Director of the Physiological Society, and a member of its Council, Chair of the Membership & Grants Committee and the Diversity/Equality Lead.

== Publications ==
Tribe is the author or co-author of over 150 scientific publications. These include:

- Jane Sandall, Rachel M. Tribe, Lisa Avery, Glen Mola, Gerard H. A. Visser, Caroline S. E. Homer Deena Gibbons, Niamh M. Kelly, Holly Powell Kennedy, Hussein Kidanto, Paul Taylor, Marleen Temmerman (2018) Short-term and long-term effects of caesarean section on the health of women and children. The Lancet 392 1349-1357
- Danielle S.Abbott, Samara K.Radford, Paul T.Seed, Rachel M.Tribe, Andrew H.Shennan (2013) Evaluation of a quantitative fetal fibronectin test for spontaneous preterm birth in symptomatic women. American Journal of Obstetrics and Gynecology 208 122.e1-122.e6
- N. M. Orsi and R. M. Tribe (2008) Cytokine networks and the regulation of uterine function in pregnancy and parturition. Journal of Neuroendocrinology 20 462–469
- Rachel M. Tribe, Mikhail L. Borin and Mordecai P. Blaustein (1994) Functionally and spatially distinct Ca2+ stores are revealed in cultured vascular smooth muscle cells Proc. Natln. Acad. Sci U.S.A. 91 5908-5912
