= Mike Tipton =

UK academic physiologist

Mike Tipton is a British academic who is Professor of Human & Applied Physiology at the Extreme Environments Laboratory, School of Sport, Health & Exercise Science at the University of Portsmouth. He is also editor-in-chief of Experimental Physiology.

== Education ==
Tipton was educated at the University of Keele and King's College, University of London.

== Career ==
He joined the University of Surrey in 1986. After 12 years at the Robens Institute and European Institute of Health and Medical Science he moved to the University of Portsmouth in 1998. He co-founded the International Drowning Researcher's Alliance.

== Research ==
Tipton's research focuses on the physiological and psychological responses to adverse environments and the selection, preparation and protection of those who enter such environments.

== Collaboration ==
Tipton is a Trustee/Director of Surf Lifesaving GB; a former chairperson and now member of the Energy Institute Health Technical Committee; a member of the Medical Advisory Board of the Ectodermal Dysplasia Society a former member of the Medical (& Survival) committee of the Royal National Lifeboat Institution (RNLI), he is a member of the Council of the RNLI. His research underpins the RNLI "Fight your Instincts" and Float First" campaign.

== Honours ==
Tipton was awarded the G. L. Brown Prize Lecture of The Physiological Society in 2014 that was published in Experimental Physiology in 2015. He is a Fellow of the Royal Society of Medicine and The Physiological Society. He has been awarded Honorary Life Membership of Surf Lifesaving GB and the International Association of Sea Survival Trainers for his contributions to saving lives at sea. He was made a Member of the Order of the British Empire (MBE) in 2018 for "services to physiological research in extreme environments", and the Ireland Medal of the Lifesaving Foundation in 2019 for "saving lives from drowning worldwide". In 2021 Tipton was a guest on the BBC Radio 4 programme The Life Scientific.

== Publications ==
Tipton has published over 650 papers, reports, reviews books and abstracts in survival in the sea and extreme environmental physiology, including the books 'The Essentials of Sea Survival' with Dr Frank Golden and 'The Science of Beach Lifeguarding' with Adam Wooler.
