= The Radclyffe School =

Location
- Hunt Lane; Chadderton; Oldham, Greater Manchester, OL9 0LS; England; 53.5455°N 2.1545°W

Information
- Type: Comprehensive foundation school
- Motto: Working Together For Excellence
- Established: 1975 (1930)
- Local authority: Oldham
- Department for Education URN: 105738 Tables
- Ofsted: Reports
- Chair of Governors: Jim Greenwood
- Head teacher: John Cregg
- Gender: Mixed
- Age: 11 to 16
- Enrolment: 1441
- Website: http://www.theradclyffeschool.co.uk/

The Radclyffe School is a mixed comprehensive school for 11- to 16-year-olds, located in Chadderton, Greater Manchester, England.

== History ==
=== Grammar school ===
The school was originally called Chadderton Grammar School and opened in 1930. It was officially opened in October 1930 by David Lindsay, 27th Earl of Crawford. It had 300 boys and girls, which rose to 700 in 1950 and 900 by 1958. It was decided to split the school into two schools – a boys' and girls'. This provoked protests from parents. In 1959, the school became Chadderton Grammar School for Girls with around 600 girls in the 1960s. The boys' school, a grammar-technical school, was on Chadderton Hall Road.

=== Comprehensive ===
It was renamed Mid Chadderton Comprehensive School after grammar schools were abolished in September 1975, and the boys' school became the North Chadderton School. The two sites of the North Chadderton Secondary Modern School were split between the two new schools based on the former girls' and boys' schools. The name "Radclyffe" was taken from a local land-owning family in the 19th century who had owned the land that the schools stood upon.

The school was originally located across two sites – the Lower School (Years 7–9) on Broadway and the Upper School (Years 10 & 11) on Hunt Lane. However, in 2008 a newer refurbished school was built at the Hunt Lane site, housing both the lower and upper school students.

== Notable former pupils ==
- Kyle Eastmond, rugby union Bath Rugby
- Craig Gill, drummer with The Inspiral Carpets
- Dominique Jackson, actress in Hollyoaks
- Mark Jordon, actor in Emmerdale
- Graham Lambert, guitarist with The Inspiral Carpets
- Sally Whittaker, actress in Coronation Street
- Susan Wray (formerly Ralph), physiologist

=== Chadderton Grammar School for Girls ===
- Vera Baird, author, Labour MP from 2001-10 for Redcar
- Dame Mavis McDonald

=== Chadderton Grammar School ===
- Sir Ron Hadfield, Chief Constable from 1990–96 of West Midlands Police
- Alan Rothwell, Coronation Street and Brookside actor
- John Stalker, former policeman and former deputy Chief Constable of Greater Manchester Police
