= James Watt (Royal Navy officer) =

Royal Navy Surgeon Vice-Admiral (1914–2009)

James Watt

Surgeon Vice-Admiral Sir James Watt KBE FRCS (19 August 1914 – 28 December 2009) was a British surgeon, Medical Director-General of the Royal Navy, 1972–1977 and maritime historian.

== Early life ==
He was born in Morpeth, Northumberland and was educated at the King Edward VI School there, before entering Durham University, where he qualified in medicine in 1938.

== Career ==
He started work as a house surgeon at Ashington Hospital, Northumberland and as resident medical officer at Princess Mary Maternity Hospital, Newcastle upon Tyne. When the Second World War started he joined the Royal Navy, spending most of the time in the Far East, the North Atlantic and the Pacific. When the war finished he continued his medical career at Guy's Hospital, London and the Royal Victoria Hospital, Newcastle-upon-Tyne, but then rejoined the Navy as a surgical specialist.

Posted initially to Royal Naval Hospital, Haslar, he also saw service in Korea, Northern Ireland and Hong Kong. He was promoted to Consultant in Surgery in 1956 and became the first joint Professor of Naval Surgery in 1965 with the rank of Surgeon Captain. He became a Surgeon Rear-Admiral when appointed Dean of Naval Medicine and Medical Officer in charge of the Institute of Naval Medicine in 1969 and was further promoted to Surgeon Vice-Admiral when appointed Medical Director-General of the Navy. He was knighted KBE in the 1975 New Year Honours, and retired from the navy in March 1977.

He was elected President of the Medical Society of London (1980–81) and President of the Royal Society of Medicine (1982-1984).

Watt was President of the Smeatonian Society of Civil Engineers for 1996. He was also the President of the Smeatonian Society of History at the University of Calgary.

He was a visiting fellow at University House, the Australian National University, Canberra.

He was also a historian with a particular interest in medicine at sea in the age of sail. His publications include,

- "The injuries of four centuries of naval warfare", Annals of the Royal College of Surgeons of England, Vol. 57 (1975)
- "Health and Settlement 1789-95; Life and death in the colony's early years," Australian and New Zealand Journal of Surgery, 59 (1989) 923-31
- "James Ramsay, 1733-1789: Naval surgeon, Naval Chaplain and Morning Star of the Anti Slavery Movement", The Mariner's Mirror, 81 (2) 1995, 156-170
- "Naval and civilian influences on eighteenth-and-nineteenth-century medical practice," The Mariner's Mirror, 97 (1) February 2001, 148-166
- "Surgery at Trafalgar," The Mariner's Mirror, 91 (2) May 2005, 251-65
