= Jean Banister =

British biologist (1917–2013)

- Born: Rachel Jean Banister; 10 March 1917; Alverstoke, Hampshire, England
- Died: 15 February 2013 (aged 95); Ardgour, Inverness-shire, Scotland
- Education: Queen Anne's School; Polish School of Medicine at the University of Edinburgh
- Scientific career
- Fields: Physiology
- Workplaces: Somerville College, University of Oxford
- Notable students: Richard W. Tsien

R. Jean Banister (10 March 1917 – 15 February 2013) was a British physiologist and academic who was a Fellow and Group Leader at Somerville College, Oxford from 1949 to 1984. Her research focused on the vascular system of the lungs and the carotid sinuses of amphibians.

== Early life and education ==
Banister was born in Alverstoke, Hampshire on March 10, 1917, and studied at Queen Anne's School in Caversham, Berkshire. She excelled in sports and music, and initially attended the Royal Academy of Music to study flute performance. Following the German invasion of Poland in September 1939, she joined the Polish School of Medicine when it moved to Edinburgh, earning an honors degree in physiology in 1948.

== Career ==
Banister became the first woman to be appointed Departmental Demonstrator of the Laboratory of Physiology at Somerville College, Oxford in 1949 and was appointed Tutorial Fellow at the College in 1951. She was known for giving live physiology demonstrations during lectures. She was an early proponent of the framework that eventually became known as evidence-based practice. Following her retirement in 1984, she went on to lecture in Saudi Arabia with the goal of inspiring women medical students.

Banister stood in as "substitute doctoral advisor" for Richard W. Tsien while Tsien's primary advisor Denis Noble was on sabbatical in 1970. Beginning in 2016, The Physiological Society has awarded an annual R Jean Banister Prize Lecture for Early-Career Physiologists.

== Personal life ==
A lover of cycling and sports cars, Banister regularly raced Porsches at the Donington Park motorsport circuit in Leicestershire.
