= The Journal of Physiology =

- Discipline: Physiology
- Language: English
- Edited by: Kim Barrett

Publication details
- History: 1878–present
- Publisher: Wiley-Blackwell on behalf of The Physiological Society
- Frequency: Semi-monthly
- Open access: Hybrid and delayed, after 1 year
- Impact factor: 5.5 (2022)

Standard abbreviations
- ISO 4: J. Physiol. (Lond.)
- NLM: J Physiol

Indexing
- CODEN: JPHYA7
- ISSN: 0022-3751 (print); 1469-7793 (web)
- LCCN: 49034373
- OCLC no.: 1754742

Links
- Journal homepage; Online access; Online archive

The Journal of Physiology is a semi-monthly peer-reviewed scientific journal that was established in 1878 and is published by Wiley-Blackwell on behalf of The Physiological Society. It covers research on all aspects of physiology, with an emphasis on human and mammalian physiology, including work at the molecular level, at the level of the cell membrane, single cells, tissues or organs, and systems physiology. The full archive back to 1878 up to issues published 12 months from the current date is freely available online. The editor-in-chief is Kim Barrett (University of California, Davis). According to the Journal Citation Reports, the journal has a 2022 impact factor of 5.5.

== History ==
The journal was first published in 1878 and edited by Michael Foster. In 1893–1894 Foster's colleague John Newport Langley took over as editor. Langley remained the proprietor and editor until his death in 1925, when The Physiological Society bought the journal from his widow. Charles Scott Sherrington was appointed the first chairman of the editorial board in 1926. In 2003 The Physiological Society moved publishing to Blackwell, now Wiley-Blackwell.

=== Previous editors-in-chief ===
The following persons are or have been chairman of the editorial board (named editor-in-chief since 2005):

- Michael Foster (1878–1906)
- John Newport Langley (1878–1926)
- Charles Scott Sherrington (1926–1935)
- E.B. Verney (1938–1943)
- George Lindor Brown (1943–1947)
- Robert Campbell Garry (1947–1950)
- R.S. Creed (1950–1956)
- Andrew Huxley (1956–1957)
- J.M. Peterson (1957–1960)
- Richard Keynes (1960–1961)
- Bernard Katz (1961–1963)
- G S Brindley (1963–1965)
- D.H. Smyth (1965–1968)
- Ian Glynn (1968–1970)
- W.F. Widdas (1970–1972)
- Richard Adrian (1972–1974)
- David Keynes Hill (1974–1976)
- P.F. Baker (1976–1977)
- T.A. Sears (1977–1978)
- B.R. Jewell (1978–1981)
- S. Thomas (1981–1982)
- K.M. Spyer (1982–1985)
- E.S. Petersen (1985–1987)
- A.V. Edwards (1987–1989)
- C.A.R.Boyd (1989–1991)
- N.B. Standen (1991–1994)
- R.E.J. Dyball (1994–1997)
- David Eisner (1997–2000)
- B.H. Hirst (2000–2002)
- S.O. Sage (2002–2005)
- W.A. Large (2005–2011)
- David J Paterson (2011–2016)
- Kim Barrett (2016–2022)
- Peter Kohl (2022-2023)
- Kim Barrett (2023–present)

== See also ==
- Experimental Physiology
- Physiological Reports
