= Jack L. Feldman =

American neuroscientist and professor

Jack L Feldman
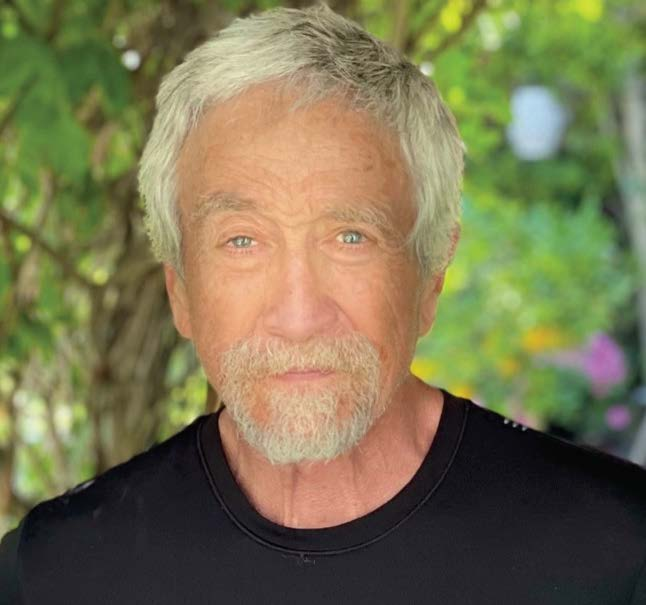

Jack L. Feldman is an American neuroscientist, David Geffen School of Medicine Chair in Neuroscience and Distinguished Professor of Neurobiology at the University of California, Los Angeles (UCLA). His research contributions include elucidating the mechanisms underlying breathing and sighing. He discovered and named the pre-Bötzinger complex, an area in the brain stem that is responsible for controlling breathing. He was the recipient of the Hodgkin–Huxley–Katz Prize from the Physiological Society in 2017.

== Early life ==
Feldman received his bachelor's degree in physics from the Polytechnic Institute of NY in 1968, and a PhD in physics from the University of Chicago. His PhD focused breathing and respiratory networks from a theoretical perspective. He went on to perform experimental neuroscience as a postdoc in Paris with Henri Gautier and Andre Hugelin and a second postdoc with Mort Cohen in New York. In 1978, he began his first academic appointment as assistant professor at Northwestern in Chicago, where he went through the ranks to full professor. In 1986, he moved to UCLA, where he is a Distinguished Professor of Neurobiology.

== Research ==
Feldman's early research focused on locating the central pattern generator responsible for breathing. In 1991 he and his colleagues identified the pre-Bötzinger complex. The area was so named because it was located immediately caudal to the Bötzinger complex named at a scientific conference held in Germany in 1980 after a bottle of Bötzinger wine served during the conference dinner. In 2016, he and his collaborators identified a neuropeptide that acts in the pre-Bötzinger complex to govern sighing. When this neuropeptide was introduced to the pre-Bötzinger complex animals engaged in vigorous respiratory sighing.

Feldman has published over 150 peer-reviewed papers in scientific journals.

== Honors ==
- Fellow, American Association for the Advancement of Science (2009)
- Hodgkin Huxley Katz Prize, The Physiological Society (2016)
