= Stromuhr =

Medical instrument

A stromuhr (literally: German for stream clock) was a medical instrument designed by Carl Ludwig in 1867 to measure the strength of flow in major arteries and veins by means of animal experiments.

For this purpose, the arteries were cut across and the stromuhr was attached between the proximal and distal stumps. The stromuhr had to be filled with the whole blood of the test animal or with a blood substitute solution beforehand.
