= Eric Neil =

British physiologist (1918-1990)

Eric Neil (15 February 1918-8 May 1990) was a British physiologist. He was John Astor Professor of Physiology at the Middlesex Hospital Medical School (now University College London Medical School) from 1956 until his retirement in 1984. He served as President of the International Union of Physiological Sciences from 1974 to 1980.

== Early life and education ==
Neil was the son of George Neil, an inspector of schools. He was born in Maryport, Cumbria and attended Queen Elizabeth Grammar School in Darlington and Heath Grammar School in Halifax. He studied at the University of Leeds, receiving a BSc in 1939, an MB ChB in 1942, an MD in 1944 and a DSc in 1953.

== Career and research ==
After eight years as a demonstrator and lecturer at Leeds Neil joined the Middlesex Hospital Medical School. In 1956 he succeeded Samson Wright as John Astor Professor of Physiology, a role he held until his retirement in 1984.

Neil’s research focused on arterial barorecepters and chemoreceptors, including the carotid bodies and carotid sinus, and their role in regulating circulation. His work also examined acid-base changes during hypothermia. This research proved relevant to the use of induced hypothermia in early open heart surgery.

He wrote Reflexogenic Areas of the Cardiovascular System (1958) with Corneille Heymans, 1938 Nobel laureate in Physiology or Medicine. Subsequently Neil wrote Circulation (1971) with Björn Folkow and for 24 years he edited successive editions of Samson Wright’s Applied Physiology. He also wrote William Harvey and the Circulation of the Blood (1975).

== Professional service ==
Neil served as Honorary Treasurer of The Physiological Society from 1961 to 1967 and went on to be Treasurer of the International Union of Physiological Sciences (IUPS). In 1974 he became President of IUPS and served until 1980 after being elected for a second term.

== Honours and personal life ==
In 1977 Neil received an honorary MD from Ghent University. In 1989 the International Society for Arterial Chemoreception instituted the De Castro-Heymans-Neil Young Scientist Prize, named in recognition of the parties’ contribution to chemoreceptor research and support for young researchers. The prize is awarded for the best presentation by a young researcher at each meeting of the society..

Neil is remembered for his wit as well as for his interest in Venetian art. Hugh Montgomery, his former student, remembers Neil left him a framed Bournville Chocolate advert from a London Underground train showing a Viking facing the bow in a dragon-prowed long boat and inscribed by Neil "Follow the direction of the dragon's tongue, and you'll not go far wrong’..

In 1946 Neil married Anne Parker, a physician he had met when she was a medical student at Leeds, and they had two daughters.
