= Wolfson Centre for Age-Related Diseases =

English research centre

Coordinates: 51.50330°N 0.09071°W

The Wolfson Centre for Age-Related Diseases (CARD) is based at the Guy's Hospital campus of King's College London, England. Research at the Wolfson CARD falls into three main Themes:

- Chronic Pain and Migraine
- Spinal Cord and Brain Repair
- Hearing Loss and Sensory Systems

The centre is currently co-headed by Professor Elizabeth Bradbury and Professor Susan Duty.
