= Henry Barcroft =

British scientist and academic

- Born: Henry Barcroft; 18 October 1904; Cambridge
- Died: 11 January 1998 (aged 93)
- Education: King's College, Cambridge
- Spouse: Bridget (Biddy) Ramsey (1933–1990)
- Children: 4
- Awards: FRS
- Scientific career
- Fields: Physiology
- Workplaces: University College, London; Queen's University, Belfast; St Thomas' Hospital, London

Henry Barcroft FRS (18 October 1904 – 11 January 1998) was a British scientist and academic, who was Professor of Physiology at St Thomas' Hospital Medical School, London from 1948 to 1971.

== Early life and education ==
Barcroft was born in Cambridge, and came from a distinguished Irish Quaker family: his father was Sir Joseph Barcroft, Professor of Physiology at Cambridge; and his mother, Mary "Minnie" Ball, was the daughter of Sir Robert Ball, one-time Royal Astronomer of Ireland who later became Lowndean Professor of Astronomy and Geometry at Cambridge.

Barcroft was educated at King's College School as a non-choral day boy, and later as a boarder at Marlborough College, where he won a Bethune Baker scholarship to study Botany, Zoology and Chemistry at King's College, Cambridge. Whilst at Cambridge he and his father jointly published two papers on blood circulation, and haemoglobin in invertebrates. He graduated in 1927 with first class honours in both parts of the Natural Sciences tripos, and then began his research work in physiology, his particular area of interest being the effect of intravenous adrenaline on aortic blood flow in dogs. He developed a new form of the stromuhr to measure the rate of blood flow at frequent intervals - an upgrade on the devices available at the time which could only take an average reading over a long period of time; he demonstrated this to the Physiological Society in January 1928. Failing to secure a Fellowship at Cambridge, Barcroft took up a Harmsworth Scholarship at St Mary's Hospital, London, where he obtained his MRCS and LRCP in 1932.

== Career ==
In 1932 Barcroft joined the Department of Physiology at University College London (UCL) where he continued to work on blood flow in animals. In 1935, he was appointed Dunville Professor of Physiology at Queen's University, Belfast, where, in collaboration with Otto Edholm, he developed the techniques of venous occlusion plethysmography, a means of measuring blood flow in limbs. During the Second World War he and Edholm carried out research on the effects of haemorrhage at the British Postgraduate Medical School in Hammersmith, London.

In 1948 Barcroft was appointed to the chair of Physiology at the Sherrington School of Physiology, St Thomas' Hospital, London where he continued his research work over a wide range of physiological areas, in particular in muscle blood flow in rhythmic exercise, the mechanism of functional hyperaemia, and vascular responses to catecholamines (hormones released into the blood during times of physical or emotional stress). In 1953, along with Jeremy Swan, he published Sympathetic Control of Human Blood Vessels, the first monograph of the Physiological Society series.

Barcroft retired from St. Thomas' Hospital in 1971, but continued to serve as Vice President of the Research Defence Society, and until 1975 as a member of the Board of Trustees of the Wellcome Trust. In November 1997, nine weeks before his death, he attended a lecture celebrating his contribution to his subject and the Sherrington School of Physiology, at a meeting of the Physiological Society at St Thomas' Hospital.

== Awards and honours ==
Barcroft was elected to a Fellowship of the Royal Society in 1953. He was awarded honorary doctorates by Queen's University, Belfast, the University of Western Australia, and the University of Innsbruck. In 1975 he was Robert Campbell Memorial Orator at the Ulster Medical Society. In June 2022, the Physiological Society unveiled a blue plaque in his honour at Queen's University, Belfast.

== Personal life ==
In 1933 he married Dr Bridget (Biddy) Ramsey, elder daughter of Arthur Ramsey, President of Magdalene College, Cambridge. They had four children.
