= Experimental Physiology =

- Discipline: Physiology
- Language: English
- Edited by: Damian Bailey

Publication details
- Former names: The Quarterly Journal of Experimental Physiology; Quarterly Journal of Experimental Physiology and Cognate Medical Sciences
- History: 1908-present
- Publisher: Wiley-Blackwell on behalf of The Physiological Society
- Frequency: Monthly
- Open access: Delayed, after 1 year
- Impact factor: 2.969 (2020)

Standard abbreviations
- ISO 4: Exp. Physiol.

Indexing
- ISSN: 0958-0670 (print); 1469-445X (web)
- LCCN: 90660987
- OCLC no.: 231048977

Links
- Journal homepage; Online archive

Experimental Physiology is a monthly peer-reviewed scientific journal published by Wiley-Blackwell on behalf of The Physiological Society. According to the Journal Citation Reports, its 2020 impact factor is 2.969 It covers all areas of physiology, especially work that deals with both physiological and pathophysiological questions that investigate gene/protein function using molecular, cellular, and whole-animal approaches. All articles become freely accessible 12 months after publication. The editor-in-chief is Damian Bailey.

The journal publishes themed special issues. An annual prize is awarded to an early-career scientist who authors the best eligible paper in the journal.

== History ==
The journal was established by Edward Sharpey-Schafer in 1908, under the title of Quarterly Journal of Experimental Physiology. In 1981, The Physiological Society took over its management. It changed to the present title in 1990, after some time being published six times a year. Previous editors in chief, or Chairman of the Editorial Board, include:

- John H. Coote: 2000-2006
- Mike Tipton

== See also ==
- The Journal of Physiology
- Physiological Reports
