= John Cryan (neurobiologist) =

Irish neurobiologist

John F. Cryan is an Irish stress neurobiologist who has made key discoveries on how the gut microbiome influences the brain. He is a nephew of the American politician John F. Cryan.

== Career ==
A native of Baslick, Castlerea, Co. Roscommon, Ireland, John Cryan received a B.Sc. (Hons) in biochemistry and PhD in pharmacology from the University of Galway, Ireland. A visiting fellowship at the Department of Psychiatry, University of Melbourne, Australia, was followed by postdoctoral fellowships at the University of Pennsylvania, Philadelphia, USA, and The Scripps Research Institute, La Jolla, California.

He spent four years as a group leader in the pharmaceutical industry at Novartis in Basel, Switzerland, prior to joining University College Cork (UCC) in 2005. He was appointed to the chair of Anatomy in 2011 and was head of the Department of Anatomy and Neuroscience in 2011, taking up the role of vice president for Research and Innovation in 2021.

== Research ==
Cryan's current research is focused on understanding the interaction between the brain, gut and microbiome, and how it applies to stress, psychiatric and immune-related disorders at key time-windows across the lifespan.

The Cryan Lab has been a global leader in defining a critical role for the gut microbiome in regulating brain and behavior. Using state-of-the-art technologies, Cryan and his colleagues were among the first to show that microbiome is critical in early life in regulating key processes in the brain, such as myelination, hippocampal neurogenesis, serotonergic neurotransmission and key components of the stress response. Functionally, he has shown that such changes translate to deficits in fear learning, visceral pain and long-term potentiation. Moreover, his group’s studies have led to a clear link being made between bacterial composition of the gut and social behaviour. His lab has applied a lifespan approach with key findings of microbiome–brain interactions in adolescence, adulthood and more recently all the way to old age.

Cryan and colleagues have shown in a landmark paper in 2011 that administration of a Lactobacillus to mice dampens down the stress response and modifies behaviors and brain chemistry and that the vagus nerve is key to this communication. This work has had a huge impact on both the microbiome and neuroscience field internationally and shepherded in a whole new concept of psychobiotics, targeting the microbiome for mental health benefits, a term first coined by Cryan and his colleague Ted Dinan in 2013. More recently, his team has been moving to translating these studies into humans.

== Career ==
Cryan is a senior editor of Neuropharmacology and of Neurobiology of Stress. He sits on the editorial board of a further 15 journals and is co-author of the bestselling The Psychobiotic Revolution: Mood, Food, and the New Science of the Gut-Brain Connection (National Geographic Press, 2017) which has been translated into Chinese, Spanish and Polish.

He is a past-president of the European Behavioral Pharmacology Society, chair of the Scientific Program Committee of ECNP Congress, 2022-2024, member of the program committee of the FENS Forum in Paris, and member of the program committee of the ECNP Workshop on Applied Neuroscience, as well as serving on the ECNP Nutrition, Resilience, Depression and Immuno-NeuroPsychiatry Networks.

He has also been a strong advocate for increasing intersection between the arts and sciences, co-curating the art exhibition “Gut Instinct” at the Glucksman Gallery in Cork,” and co-organized an event “Playing your Heart out” at the intersection of music and neuroscience in collaboration with Richard Reed Parry of the rock band Arcade Fire.
