= British Neuroscience Association =

Scientific society

- Abbreviation: BNA
- Formation: February 23, 1968; 58 years ago
- Type: Nonprofit
- Registration no.: 04307833
- Legal status: Charity
- Purpose: Neuroscience
- Headquarters: The Dorothy Hodgkin Building, Whitson Street, Bristol BS1 3NY.
- Members: 2,500
- Website: https://www.bna.org.uk

The British Neuroscience Association (BNA) is a scientific society with around 2,500 members. Starting out as an informal gathering of scientists meeting at the Black Horse Public House in London to discuss brain-related topics (the 'London Black Horse Group'), on 23 February 1968 it was formerly established as the Brain Research Association, and subsequently relaunched as the British Neuroscience Association in 1997.

The BNA is the largest UK organisation of its kind, supporting and promoting neuroscience and neuroscientists.

== Charitable objects ==
It is a registered charity (number 1103852), with charitable objects as follows:

‘To preserve and protect health and advance public education in neurosciences related to health and disease (in particular but not exclusively) by:’

1. Promoting on a multidisciplinary basis the study of the development structure and function of the nervous system in health and disease.
2. Promoting the dissemination of information to all those interested in the neurosciences and related disciplines by means of lectures, discussions, meetings and reports from time to time obtained from such researchers.
3. Advising as far as possible on issues in neurosciences related to health and disease.
4. Endeavouring to increase public awareness and understanding of neuroscience research in health and disease.
5. Assisting in the training of neuroscientists and other professionals engaged in neuroscience teaching and research.
6. Representing the interests of neuroscience researchers and promoting the case for the advancement of neuroscience research in the United Kingdom to government, to agencies providing research funding and to bodies engaged in science administration, regulation and standards.

The BNA is a member of the International Brain Research Organization (IBRO), the Federation of European Neuroscience Societies (FENS), and the Royal Society of Biology (RSB).

== Publications ==
Brain and Neuroscience Advances
- Discipline: Neuroscience
- Language: English
- Edited by: Kate Baker

Publication details
- History: Since 2017
- Publisher: SAGE Publishing in association with British Neuroscience Association
- Open access: Yes

Standard abbreviations
- ISO 4: Brain Neurosci. Adv.

Indexing
- ISSN: 2398-2128 (print); 2398-2128 (web)

Links
- Journal homepage

The BNA publishes a peer-reviewed scientific journal, Brain and Neuroscience Advances with Kate Baker (University of Cambridge) as editor-in-chief. It also publishes the BNA Bulletin membership magazine.

== Events ==
The key event of the BNA is the biennial 'Festival of Neuroscience'. The festivals are unique in bringing together several people and organisations with a shared interested in neuroscience - societies, charities, companies, scientists, clinicians and members of the public too.
