= Graham Dockray =

British physiologist

Graham John Dockray FMedSci, FRS (born 1946) is a British physiologist, and Emeritus Professor of Physiology at University of Liverpool.

== Life ==
He earned a B.Sc. and Ph.D. in zoology, from University of Nottingham in 1971.
