= Ole Holger Petersen =

Danish-born professor

Ole Holger Petersen CBE FRS FMedSci FLSW
- Born: 3 March 1943 (age 83); Copenhagen, Denmark
- Occupation: Research professor
- Employer: Cardiff University
- Parent: Elisabeth Klein (mother)

Ole Holger Petersen (born 3 March 1943) is a Danish-born research professor at Cardiff University where he studies physiology, especially calcium signalling and the pancreas. He was born in 1943 in Copenhagen, the first son of Joergen Petersen, an officer in the Danish navy, and Elisabeth née Klein, a pianist.

Prior to this he was Symers Professor of Physiology at the University of Dundee, and then George Holt Professor of Physiology at the University of Liverpool.

Petersen was elected a member of the Academia Europaea in 1988. He was elected a Fellow of the Royal Society (FRS) in 2000 "for his major contributions to the understanding of the cell physiology of calcium signalling", and appointed a Commander of the Order of the British Empire (CBE) in the 2008 New Year Honours, "for services to Science".

Petersen was elected a Fellow of the Learned Society of Wales in 2011. He is also a Fellow of the Academy of Medical Sciences (FMedSci).
