= Member of the Academia Europaea =

Membership of the Academia Europaea
- Sponsored by: Academia Europaea
- Total no. of fellows: 5,600
- Website: www.ae-info.org/ae/Acad_Main/List_of_Members/ListMembersByAlphabet

Membership of the Academia Europaea (MAE) is an award conferred by the Academia Europaea to individuals that have demonstrated "sustained academic excellence". Membership is by invitation only by existing MAE and judged during a peer review selection process. Members are entitled to use the post-nominal letters MAE.

== Members of the Academia Europaea ==
New members have been announced annually since 1988.

Some members of the Academia Europaea have received awards, medals and prizes, such as the Nobel Prize, the Wolf Prize or the Turing Award.

=== Honorary members ===
To be considered for election to honorary membership, candidates should be people who, by means other than through their own individual scholarship have made a significant contribution to the achievement of the objectives of the Academia Europaea. Honorary members include:

- Irina Bokova
- Gro Harlem Brundtland
- Philippe Busquin
- Rafał Dutkiewicz
- Seamus Heaney
- Ralph Kohn
- Frank H. T. Rhodes
- Klaus Tschira
