= Women of Outstanding Achievement Photographic Exhibition =

The Women of Outstanding Achievement Photographic Exhibition was an annual event organised by the UKRC between 2006 and 2012, when it was subsumed into the WISE Campaign awards. It comprised creative photographs of outstanding women within science, engineering and technology (SET). Between four and seven women were chosen each year to be photographed by Robert Taylor. Nominations occurred in the Autumn of each year and the recipients were announced at a ceremony in March of the following year.

Many of the portraits are on permanent loan to institutions such as the University of Oxford and The Royal Society;those of Joanna Kennedy, Julia King and Wendy Hall were hung in the Royal Academy of Engineering. The portrait of Nancy Rothwell was purchased by the National Portrait Gallery.

== Award recipients ==
Recipients were (with job titles at the time):

2012

- Maggie Philbin, BBC Journalist and CEO TeenTech
- Belinda Swain, Chief Airworthiness Engineer at Rolls-Royce
- Angela Brady, President of the Royal Institute of British Architects (RIBA) and founder of Women in Architecture
- Fiona Marshall, Founder and Chief Scientific Officer at Heptares Therapeutics Ltd

2011

- Dame Ann Dowling, Head of Engineering department at the University of Cambridge
- Dame Athene Donald, Professor at the University of Cambridge
- Cary Marsh, CEO & Founder of Mydeo.com and founding member of the Everywoman Modern Muse campaign
- Dervilla Mitchell, Senior Engineer at Arup
- Eileen Ingham, Head of the Institute of Medical and Biological Engineering at the University of Leeds
- Kate Bellingham, Broadcaster, Maths teacher, President of Young Engineers and a National STEM Careers Coordinator
- Dr Phebe Mann, Senior Lecturer and the first woman to hold five professional engineering qualifications in the UK

2010

- Helen Atkinson, Professor of Engineering and Head of Mechanics of Materials Research Group, University of Leicester
- Sarah Baillie, Inventor and creator of the Haptic Cow and Senior Lecturer at the Royal Veterinary College
- Amanda Fisher, Director of the Medical Research Council Clinical Sciences Centre at Hammersmith Hospital and Professor and Head of Division of Clinical Sciences, Imperial College, London
- Julia Higgins, Former Principal of the Faculty of Engineering, Imperial College London
- Jackie Hunter, Senior Vice President and Head of Science Environment Development, GlaxoSmithKline
- Helen Mason, Astrophysicist and Senior Tutor at St Edmund's College, Cambridge and lead on the Sun|Trek Project

2009

- Ann Budge, Founder and Former Chief Executive of the Sopra Group
- Carolin Crawford, Senior Outreach Officer at the Institute of Astronomy at University of Cambridge and Fellow of Emmanuel College
- Lynne Frostick, Professor of Geography at the University of Hull
- Dr Jenny Gristock, Research Fellow at SISSA, the International School for Advanced Studies in Trieste, Italy
- Barbara Jones, Founder and Director of amazonails
- Linda Partridge, Weldon Professor of Biometry and Director of the University College London Institute of Healthy Ageing

2008

- Dame Kay Davies, Dr Lee's Professor of Anatomy and Director of the MRC Functional Genetics Unit at the University of Oxford
- Uta Frith, Emeritus Professor of Cognitive Development at UCL and Research Foundation Professor at Aarhus University
- Dame Nancy Rothwell, MRC Research Professor, Deputy President and Deputy Vice Chancellor at the University of Manchester
- Wendy Sadler, Director of Science Made Simple Ltd and works in the School of Physics and Astronomy at Cardiff University
- Joanna Kennedy, Director of Ove Arup and Partners
- Anne Glover, Chief Scientific Advisor for Scotland within the Scottish Government

2007

- Carol Robinson, Professor in the department of Chemistry at the University of Cambridge
- Frances Ashcroft, Professor in the department of physiology, Anatomy and Genetics at the University of Oxford
- Dr Averil Macdonald, Physics Department at the University of Reading
- Dr Sima Adhya, Technical Product Manager at QAT, QinetiQ
- Julia King, Professor and Vice Chancellor at Aston University
- Ijeoma Uchegbu, Professor in the School of Pharmacy at the University of London

2006

- Wendy Hall, Professor of Computer Science at the University of Southampton
- Jocelyn Bell Burnell, Astrophysicist and Visiting Professor at the University of Oxford
- Kathy Sykes, Professor, Holds the Collier Chair in Public Engagement of Science and Engineering at the University of Bristol
- Dr Maggie Aderin, Managing Director of Science Innovation Ltd and Senior Project Manager at Space Science at Sira Ltd
- Julia Goodfellow, Professor, Chief Executive Biotechnology and Biological Sciences Research Council
- Rebecca George, Director at IBM
