= Institute of Cardiovascular & Medical Sciences =

Research centre at University of Glasgow

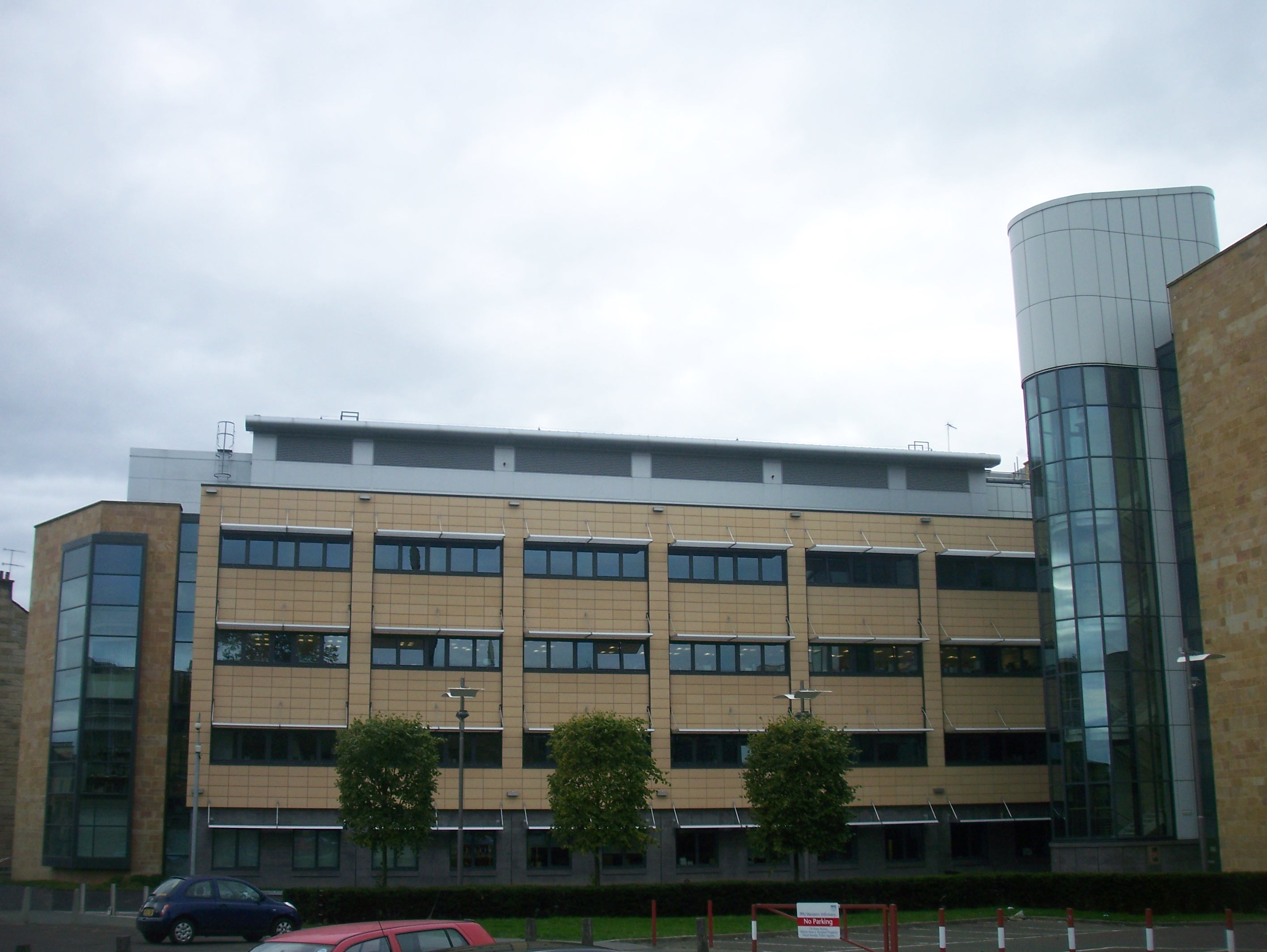
- Established: 2010
- Field of research: Cardiovascular Medicine
- Director: Rhian Touyz
- Staff: 175 (research and support staff)
- Students: 116 PGR students 175 PGT students
- Address: 126 University Place, G12 8TA
- Location: Glasgow
- Operating agency: University of Glasgow
- Website: https://www.gla.ac.uk/researchinstitutes/icams/

The Institute of Cardiovascular & Medical Sciences (ICAMS) is the purpose-built British Heart Foundation cardiovascular research facility at the University of Glasgow. The Director of this Institute is Rhian Touyz, MSc (Med), PhD. ICAMS is part of the College of Medical, Veterinary & Life Sciences, which was formed in 2010.

== Description ==
There were around 175 research and support staff, as well as PhD & MD students (116 in 2017–18). Research is the primary purpose and activity of this Institute.

The staff of this institute also run and contribute to the following post-graduate programmes:- MSc Cardiovascular Sciences, MSc Clinical Pharmacology, MSc Clinical Trials, and Stratified Medicine, MSc Sports & Exercise Science & Medicine, and MSc Stratified Medicine and Pharmacological Innovation.
