= Lucilla Poston =

British physiologist

Lucilla Poston CBE
- Education: Felsted School
- Alma mater: University of London
- Known for: human physiology; disorders of pregnancy
- Awards: 2017 CBE
- Scientific career
- Institutions: King's College, London
- Doctoral students: Lucy Chappell

Lucilla Poston CBE is a physiologist specialising in problems during pregnancy. She is a professor of maternal and fetal health at King's College London.

== Personal life and education ==
Poston attended Felsted School in 1970, one of the first girls to be educated there after the school became co-educational. She graduated with a degree in physiology from University College, London and was also awarded her doctorate by University of London.

== Career and research ==
She was appointed as a professor in King's College in 1995. Poston's research is about disorders of pregnancy especially when caused by maternal nutrition, and how children's lives can be affected. She has a large multidisciplinary research team with research projects that focus on premature birth, pre-eclampsia and complications from maternal obesity. Poston founded and is Director of the Maternal and Fetal Research Unit which undertakes large-scale clinical trials.

Her early research was into the control of the circulatory system of the placenta showed its relevance to pre-eclampsia. She led a clinical trial that changed medical practice through demonstrating that anti-oxidant supplements did not prevent pre-eclampsia.

== Publications ==
Poston is the author or co-author of over 440 scientific publications including:

- Poston, Lucilla (1 July 2001). "Intrauterine Vascular Development: Programming Effects of Nutrition on Vascular Function in the new Born and Adult". Nutrition and Health. 15 (3–4): 207–212. doi:10.1177/026010600101500409. ISSN 0260-1060. PMID 12003086. S2CID 2518309.
- Chappell, Lucy C; Seed, Paul T; Briley, Annette L; Kelly, Frank J; Lee, Rosalind; Hunt, Beverley J; Parmar, Kiran; Bewley, Susan J; Shennan, Andrew H; Steer, Philip J; Poston, Lucilla (4 September 1999). "Effect of antioxidants on the occurrence of pre-eclampsia in women at increased risk: a randomised trial". The Lancet. 354 (9181): 810–816. doi:10.1016/S0140-6736(99)80010-5. PMID 10485722. S2CID 33161705.
- the PRECISE Network; von Dadelszen, Peter; Flint-O’Kane, Meriel; Poston, Lucilla; Craik, Rachel; Russell, Donna; Tribe, Rachel M.; d’Alessandro, Umberto; Roca, Anna; Jah, Hawanatu; Temmerman, Marleen (30 April 2020). "The PRECISE (PREgnancy Care Integrating translational Science, Everywhere) Network's first protocol: deep phenotyping in three sub-Saharan African countries". Reproductive Health. 17 (S1): 51. doi:10.1186/s12978-020-0872-9. ISSN 1742-4755. PMC 7191688. PMID 32354357.
- Bornstein, S. R.; Guan, K.; Brunßen, C.; Mueller, G.; Kamvissi-Lorenz, V.; Lechler, R.; Trembath, R.; Mayr, M.; Poston, L.; Sancho, R.; Ahmed, S. (2 March 2021). "The transCampus Metabolic Training Programme Explores the Link of SARS-CoV-2 Virus to Metabolic Disease". Hormone and Metabolic Research. 53 (3): 204–206. doi:10.1055/a-1377-6583. ISSN 0018-5043. PMID 33652492. S2CID 232101378.

== Awards ==
In 2000, Poston was awarded the Joan Mott Prize Lecture by the Physiological Society. In 2009 she was elected to be a Fellow of the Academy of Medical Sciences. In 2010 Poston was awarded the G L Brown Prize Lecture by the Physiological Society. In 2017 she was made CBE for services to Women’s Health and appointed Emeritus Senior Investigator by the National Institute for Health Research (NIHR). In 2021 Poston was President of the International Society for Developmental Origins of Health and Disease.
