= Changing Channels =

Changing Channels may refer to:

- Changing Channels (Jerry Douglas album), 1987
- Changing Channels (Pangaea album), 2023
- "Changing Channels", a song by Jimmy Buffett from Off to See the Lizard, 1989
- "Changing Channels", a 2009 episode of Supernatural
