= Toumba (DJ) =

Jordanian DJ and producer

Yazan Zyadat
- Also known as: Toumba
- Born: Amman, Jordan
- Occupation(s): DJ, record producer, songwriter, remixer, mixing engineer, sound designer
- Years active: 2019–present

Yazan Zyadat (born 24 October 1998), known artistically as Toumba, is a Jordanian DJ, record producer, and sound designer based in Amman.

== Early life and education ==
Zyadat was born and raised in Amman, Jordan. Growing up in a musical family, he began playing guitar at a young age and developed a passion for rock and metal, which ultimately drew him to aggressive electronic music, such as early Skrillex.

Zyadat became interested in dance music while studying engineering at Loughborough University in the UK. In December 2019, a TSVI track called "Hossam" played by Sherelle inspired him to pursue music production. He remarked to DJ Mag, "She played TSVI’s 'Hossam', and when I first heard it, it was like two worlds colliding. That’s why I got into production, because I thought, 'I can make that.'" He noted that "Towards the end of 2019, I started messing around with production, and the first person I would send my tracks to was TSVI," adding that he made his first tracks on his "friend's mum's Sony speaker."

== Career ==
Toumba started making music in 2020, during the COVID-19 lockdowns. That year, he released EP Sabah Fakhri/Tidallal, marking his first solo original release under the moniker of Toumba. He also organized the Grief Into Rage compilation to raise funds for victims of an explosion in Beirut that resulted in the deaths of 218 people in August.

Zyadat released the EP Rosefinch on label Hypnic Jerks in 2022, named for Jordan's national bird. The EP samples a traditional Bedouin song in one track and incorporates standard synthesizers and hardware, arranging them in an Arabic meter that evokes what is often perceived as "traditional" or "Middle Eastern" music. It received praise from Mixmag, which described it as "a great EP which outlined his unique sound and burgeoning promise."

Zyadat made his on debut on the label Hessle Audio with the EP Petals, released in February 2023. He connected with Hessle Audio when label affiliate Joe discovered an unreleased track by Zyadat on ZULI's NTS show and reached out. After sending more music, he met co-founder Ben UFO during his first set in Jordan in November 2021, where Ben expressed interest in his track "Istibtan," which became the foundation for the Petals EP and marked Zyadat's first experience creating music specifically for an EP. Petals, described as "paradigm shifting" by Resident Advisor, focuses on various regions of Jordan, integrating dabke, wedding songs, and other musical and dance traditions. The track "Istibtan" offers a reinterpretation of a traditional Jordanian wedding song, characterized by deep sub-bass, while title track "Petals" showcases a distinctive heavy swing typical of southern Jordanian music, and was described by Resident Advisor as "a take on South Jordanian music that sounds like UK funky tailored for the Hessle Audio universe." The B-side track "Hazzeh" deconstructs traditional dabke, while "Identity Crisis" presents uplifting melodies in an unconventional maqam rast style. Zyadat released the EP Janoob in June 2023 through the label Nervous Horizon. It features dabke rhythms and hand drum elements while blending synthetic drum machines and slower tempos influenced by European techno, footwork, and grime, with traditional Arab instrumentation appearing only sparingly.

DJ Mag characterizes Zyadat's work as a merging of "cutting-edge machine drums and heavy electronic bass with the melodies and percussive rhythms of the Levant." Crack Magazine credits him with creating "a distinctive style of club music that incorporates the rhythms, microtonal scales and timbres found in music across the Middle East." He is influenced by Levantine music, and more specifically Jordanian music. He has stated that he is "more influenced by music scenes and styles of play rather than people." He cites Mark Pritchard as one of his favorite producers.

Zyadat has been recognized by The Jordan Times as "the first Jordanian DJ and producer to take his music to venues and clubs across Europe." He is an active participant in Amman's electronic underground and a co-curator of the city's club and arts venue MNFA, a community project and club space where producers, DJs and creatives meet to play music and exchange ideas. He has performed DJ sets across Europe, including at Dekmantel Festival, CTM Festival and Unsound Festival.

In 2023, Zyadat was included in Mixmag's list of "Top 25 Producers Who Defined The Year 2023". In 2024, Resident Advisor included his "FACT MIX 938" on their list of best mixes of the year, describing it as "totally mesmerising, the kind of mix that triggers 1,000 wormholes and—should you listen in a particularly fragile state—possibly floods of tears" and as "bold, cinematic, heart-on-sleeve DJing."

=== Albums and EPs ===
- Sabah Fakhri/Tidallal (EP) (2020)
- 115 (EP) (2022) (All Centre)
- Rosefinch (EP) (2022) (Hypnic Jerks)
- Petals (EP) (2023) (Hessle Audio)
- Janoob (EP) (2023) (Nervous Horizon)

=== Remixes ===
- "Bell Curve - Staircase (Toumba Remix)" (2023)
- "Tano - 10-11 (Toumba Remix)" (2023)
