= Catriona Kennedy =

Senior lecturer at the University of York

Catriona Kennedy completed her PhD at, and now is a senior lecturer at the University of York and director of the Center for Eighteenth Century Studies. Kennedy specialises in British and Irish history with research interests in the cultural history of war, politics, gender and national identity.

Kennedy was part of the expert panel for the discussion of the Gordon Riots on BBC Radio 4's In Our Time in May 2019.

== Selected publications ==
- Soldiering in Britain and Ireland, 1750-1850 : men of arms. Palgrave Macmillan. 2013. ISBN 9781137270870.
- Kennedy, C. (2013). Narratives of the Revolutionary and Napoleonic Wars : military and civilian experience in Britain and Ireland. Palgrave Macmillan UK. ISBN 9780230275430.
