= Joan Mott Prize Lecture =

Learned society award lecture

- Location: London
- Presented by: The Physiological Society
- Website: www.physoc.org/supporting-you/prize-lectures/joan-mott-prize-lecture/

The Joan Mott Prize Lecture is a prize lecture awarded annually by The Physiological Society in honour of Joan Mott.

== Laureates ==
Laureates of the award have included:

- 1996: Maria Fitzgerald
- 1998: Janice M. Marshall
- 2000: Lucilla Poston
- 2002: Helen Skaer
- 2004: Barbara Casadei
- 2006: Susan Wray
- 2008: Abigail L. Fowden
- 2010: Kay Davies
- 2012: Diane Lipscombe
- 2013: Eleanor A. Maguire
- 2014: Linda Partridge
- 2015: Hannelore Daniel - Intestinal absorption of sugars and peptides: from textbook to surprises
- 2017: Rhian Touyz

== See also ==
- Physiological Society Annual Review Prize Lecture
