= BMFMS =

The initials BMFMS may refer to:

- Sibiu Stock Exchange, known as Bursa Monetar Financiarã şi de Mãrfuri Sibiu in Romanian.
- British Maternal and Fetal Medicine Society
