= Toumba (disambiguation) =

A Toumba, in archaeology, is an ancient type of mound in Greece.

Toumba may also refer to:

- Toumba (Thessaloniki), Greece, a district of Thessaloniki
  - Toumba Stadium, Greece, a multipurpose stadium
- Toumba (DJ), a Jordanian DJ
