= Pamela Morton =

British computing educator and academic administrator

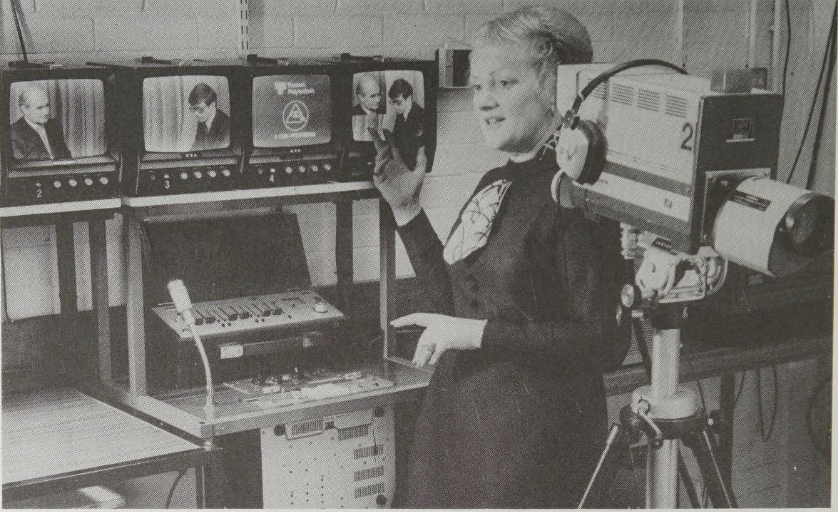
- Morton in Thames Polytechnic TV studios
- Born: 1933 (age 92–93); London, England
- Other name: Pam Morton
- Occupations: Computing educator, Civil servant
- Years active: 1954–1990s
- Employer(s): Laboratory of the Government Chemist; Ministry of Technology; Thames Polytechnic
- Organization(s): Parliamentary Information Technology Committee (PITCOM); British Computer Society
- Known for: Advocacy for women in computing; IT policy development
- Title: Senior Lecturer
- Awards: Council for Industry and Higher Education Partnership Award

Pamela Morton (often credited as Pam Morton) is a British computing educator and academic administrator. She is recognised for her tenure at Thames Polytechnic (later the University of Greenwich) and her advocacy for women's participation in information technology and engineering. During the late 1970s and 1980s, she directed advanced computing curricula, served on national IT policy advisory bodies, and published research regarding gender-based access to technical education.

== Early life and education ==
Morton was raised in London. She pursued a University of London internal degree on a part-time basis while employed full-time, eventually completing a combined program in mathematics, chemistry, and physics at a London polytechnic.

== Civil service career ==
In 1954, Morton joined the British Civil Service as an Experimental Officer at the Laboratory of the Government Chemist, where she supervised laboratory teams and analysed imported foodstuffs, alcohol, and sugar products.

In 1965, she transferred to the Ministry of Technology within the Controller's Planning Unit. Tasked with streamlining the retrieval of research and development expenditure data for Parliamentary questions, Morton led the design of a keyword thesaurus and database. The system used ICT's FIND 1, an early fourth-generation programming language, to aggregate data across approximately thirty research establishments. The project was used as a test-bed for FIND 2, an early spreadsheet-like facility.

== Thames Polytechnic and computing education ==
Morton entered higher education in 1970, joining the computing department at Thames Polytechnic where she worked as a lecturer. By the late 1970s, she was the director of the institution's advanced computer studies course.

In his 1981 book Women in Computing, Geoff Simons identified Morton as a significant contributor to British computing. Simons noted her view that women were well-suited for roles in systems analysis and design, and recorded her observation that female students frequently outperformed their male counterparts in her courses. By 1985, she had been promoted to Senior Lecturer in the School of Computing and Information Technology.

== Pedagogical innovation ==
Morton was an early adopter of audio-visual techniques in the classroom. Along with colleague Douglas Hainline, she used the polytechnic's television studios to record student role-plays and presentations in systems investigation. This allowed students to review and critique their own communication styles and performance in a professional context.

In 1990, she had won the Peugeot Talbot /Council for Industry and Higher Education Partnership Award for fostering entrepreneurial and professional skills in first year undergraduate students.

== Early Women in STEM Research and advocacy ==
Morton was pioneering in her academic work focused on the structural barriers to women entering technical fields. Her 1985 paper, "Women in Information Technology: Engineering Aspects of the British Experience," published in IEEE Transactions on Education, compared British and American educational frameworks. She argued that the flexibility of the American higher education system—specifically later specialization and conversion courses—facilitated higher female participation than the more rigid English system.

The paper also analysed the impact of initiatives such as Women into Science and Engineering (WISE) and noted that at Thames Polytechnic, five out of six graduates receiving first-class honours in computer science were women, most of whom had no prior background in the subject. Morton also authored The Microelectronic Revolution—Can the Education System be Made to Cope?, which examined the broader educational implications of rapid Microelectronics development.

In 1988, The Times profiled Morton's success in increasing female enrolment. By structuring a three-year computing course to accommodate mature students with family responsibilities, she achieved a female participation rate of approximately 25%.

Morton's research was a catalyst for the creation of the Women into Information Technology campaign and active member. IT Skills Agency approached Morton with a view to organising a campaign to increase the number of women entering the IT industry. The campaign received backing from the Department of Trade and Industry (United Kingdom) and "over 60 major IT employers as well as from the world of education and training" when it launched in 1990.

== Professional and parliamentary roles ==
Morton held several national advisory positions:

Parliamentary Information Technology Committee (PITCOM): Served on the council of this cross-party group, advising on the societal implications of IT policy.

British Computer Society (BCS): Served as the Education Liaison Officer for the London Branch Committee, bridging the gap between professional industry standards and academic curricula.

== Legacy ==
In 2001, Morton was recognised as one of the "pioneers in the electrical, electronics, and computer fields" when she was interviewed by Janet Abbate for the Institute of Electrical and Electronics Engineers(IEE) History Center's oral history collection. Her interview was one of fifty-two that contributed to the basis of Abbate's Computer History Museum Award-winning book Recoding Gender: Women’s Changing Participation in Computing (2012). Other interviewees included, Frances Allen, Jean Bartik, Barbara Liskov, Karen Spärck Jones and Dame Stephanie Shirley.

Morton is regarded as part of the first generation of British computing educators to integrate curriculum design with gender equality and national policy. Her work at Thames Polytechnic and within PITCOM established a precedent for widening participation in the UK's information technology sector.
