= Linda Partridge =

British biogerontologist

Professor Dame Linda Partridge DBE FRS FRSE FMedSci
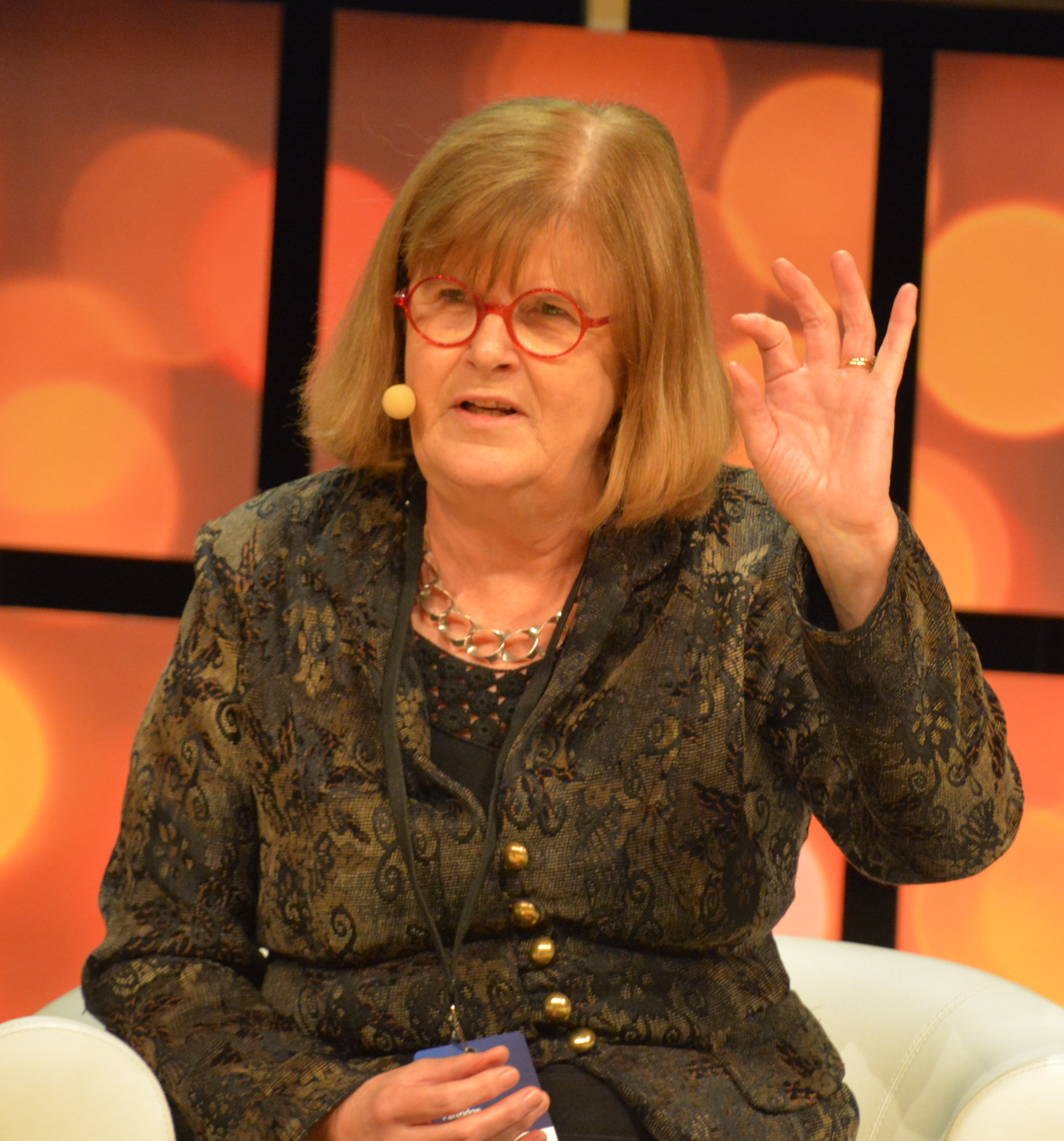
- Born: 18 March 1950 (age 76)
- Education: University of Oxford (BA, MA, DPhil)
- Spouse: Michael J. Morgan
- Awards: Frink Medal (1999); Sewall Wright Award (2002); Commander of the Order of the British Empire (2003); Longevity Prize of the Fondation Ipsen (2004); Member of EMBO (2005); Darwin-Wallace Medal (2008); Croonian Lecture (2009); Dame Commander of the Order of the British Empire (2009); Foreign Honorary Member of the American Academy of Arts and Sciences (2010); Joan Mott Prize Lecture (2014); Mendel Medal (2021)
- Scientific career
- Fields: Genetics; Gerontology
- Workplaces: University of Edinburgh; University of York; University College London; University of Oxford
- Thesis: Behavioural aspects of the ecology of some paridae (1974)
- Linda Partridge's voice from the BBC programme The Life Scientific, 28 May 2013.
- Website: www.ucl.ac.uk/iha/people/linda-partridge

Dame Linda Partridge (born 18 March 1950) is a British geneticist, who studies the biology and genetics of ageing (biogerontology) and age-related diseases, such as Alzheimer's disease and Parkinson's disease. Partridge is currently Weldon Professor of Biometry at the Institute of Healthy Ageing, Research Department of Genetics, Evolution and Environment, University College London, and the Founding Director Emeritus of the Max Planck Institute for the Biology of Ageing in Cologne, Germany.

== Education ==
Partridge was educated at the Convent of the Sacred Heart School in Tunbridge Wells and the University of Oxford from which she was awarded Master of Arts and Doctor of Philosophy degrees.

== Career ==
After completing her DPhil at the University of Oxford, Partridge became a Natural Environment Research Council (NERC) post-doctoral fellow at the University of York, and in 1976 moved to the University of Edinburgh where she became Professor of Evolutionary Biology. In 1994 she moved to University College London (UCL) as Weldon Professor of Biometry, and was the Director of the Institute of Healthy Ageing between 2007 and 2019. In 2008 Partridge became a Director in the Max Planck Society and the Founding Director of the Max Planck Institute for Biology of Ageing in Cologne, Germany.

== Awards ==
Partridge was elected a Fellow of the Royal Society in 1996 and appointed Commander of the Order of the British Empire (CBE) in 2003. Her husband, Michael J. Morgan was also elected FRS in 2005. She was elected to the Academy of Medical Sciences in 2004, and awarded the Linnean Society of London's prestigious Darwin-Wallace Medal in 2008. In 2009, she was appointed Dame Commander of the Order of the British Empire (DBE), and received the Croonian Lectureship from the Royal Society.

In March 2009, the UKRC announced Dame Linda as one of six Women of Outstanding Achievement in Science, Engineering and Technology.

She was awarded Foreign Honorary Membership of the American Academy of Arts and Sciences in 2010, and of the German National Academy of Sciences Leopoldina in 2023.

She has been awarded Honorary Degrees (DSc) from the University of St Andrews (2004), the University of Oxford (2011), the University of Bath (2011), the University of Brighton (2012), the University of Kent (2017), the University of Edinburgh (2017), Imperial College London (2019), and the University of East Anglia (2019).
