= Pitchfork Music Festival Paris 2016 =

Music festival

- Dates: 27–29 October 2016
- Locations: Grande halle de la Villette, Paris, France
- Website: pitchforkmusicfestival.fr

The Pitchfork Music Festival Paris 2016 was held from 27 to 29 October 2016 at the Grande halle de la Villette, Paris, France. It was broadcast live on the official website of The Line of Best Fit.

The festival was preceded by block party Avant-Garde, held in seven venues around Paris on 25 and 26 October.

== Line-ups ==
Artists listed from latest to earliest set times.

Thursday, 27 October	Friday, 28 October	Saturday, 29 October
Nick Murphy FKA Chet Faker; Mount Kimbie; DJ Shadow; Floating Points (Live); Suuns; Parquet Courts; Lucy Dacus; Aldous RH	Moderat; Todd Terje & the Olsens; Bat for Lashes; Explosions in the Sky; Flavien Berger; Brandt Brauer Frick; Porches; C Duncan	Tale of Us; Daphni; Motor City Drum Ensemble; Acid Arab (Live); M.I.A.; ABRA; Warpaint; Minor Victories; Shame; Whitney; Bonzai; Joey Purp

=== Avant-Garde and After Parties line-ups ===
Pitchfork Avant-Garde opening parties were held over two days, on 25 and 26 October in seven venues. The After Parties were held in collaboration with Red Bull Music Academy Paris at Le Trabendo on 27 and 28 October.

Café de la Danse
Tuesday, 25 October	Wednesday, 26 October
Frances; Loyle Carner; Krrum	Thom Sonny Green; Adia Victoria; Robbing Millions

Badaboum
Tuesday, 25 October	Wednesday, 26 October
Fickle Friends; Mabel; Nilüfer Yanya	Requin Chagrin; Jordan Rakei; Skott

Mécanique Ondulatoire
Tuesday, 25 October	Wednesday, 26 October
Anteros; Hoops; Get Inuit	Cherry Glazerr; Communions; Lucy Dacus

Supersonic
Tuesday, 25 October	Wednesday, 26 October
Alex Cameron; Smerz; Klangstof	Kenton Slash Demon; Dark0; Fhin

Pop-Up du Label
Tuesday, 25 October	Wednesday, 26 October
Cleopold; Connie Constance; Alfie Connor	Isaac Gracie; Beaty Heart; Pi Ja Ma

La Loge
Tuesday, 25 October	Wednesday, 26 October
Okay Kaya; Cameron AG; Faroe	Kaitlyn Aurelia Smith; Anna of the North; Alyss

Café de la Press
Tuesday, 25 October	Wednesday, 26 October
Jones; Kweku Collins; Manast LL'	Tommy Genesis; Tirzah; Salute

After Parties
Thursday, 27 October	Friday, 28 October
Ryan Hemsworth; Clams Casino; Jessy Lanza; River Tiber; Malibu	Bambounou; Pangaea; Jacques; Dollkraut DJ; Lamusa
