= Helen Atkinson =

British academic (born 1960)

Dame Helen Atkinson DBE, FREng
- Occupation: Professor of Engineering
- Title: Pro-Vice-Chancellor
- Spouse: Richard Atkinson

Academic background
- Education: University of Cambridge, Imperial College London

Academic work
- Discipline: Mechanical Engineering
- Sub-discipline: Metallurgy and Materials Science
- Institutions: Atomic Energy Authority, Sheffield City Polytechnic, University of Sheffield, University of Leicester, Cranfield University

Dame Helen Valerie Atkinson DBE FREng (born 29 April 1960) is Pro-Vice-Chancellor of Cranfield University's School of Aerospace, Transport and Manufacturing. She was previously Head of the University of Leicester's Department of Engineering and later Leicester's Graduate Dean. In 2010, she was designated one of the UKRC's Women of Outstanding Achievement and featured in the Women of Outstanding Achievement Photographic Exhibition. She was elected a fellow of the Royal Academy of Engineering in 2007, was a vice-president of the Academy from 2012 to 2014 and was elected to its Trustee Board in 2014.

Atkinson was appointed Commander of the Order of the British Empire (CBE) in 2014 and Dame Commander of the Order of the British Empire (DBE) in the 2021 Birthday Honours for services to engineering and education.

== Education ==
Atkinson has a first class degree from Girton College, Cambridge in Metallurgy and Materials Science, and a PhD from Imperial College, London. Her PhD is on the transmission electron microscopy of grain growth in oxide scales, and was carried out at the Atomic Energy Authority at Harwell.
