= Julia Higgins =

British polymer scientist (born 1942)

Professor Dame Julia Higgins DBE FRS FREng HonFInstP
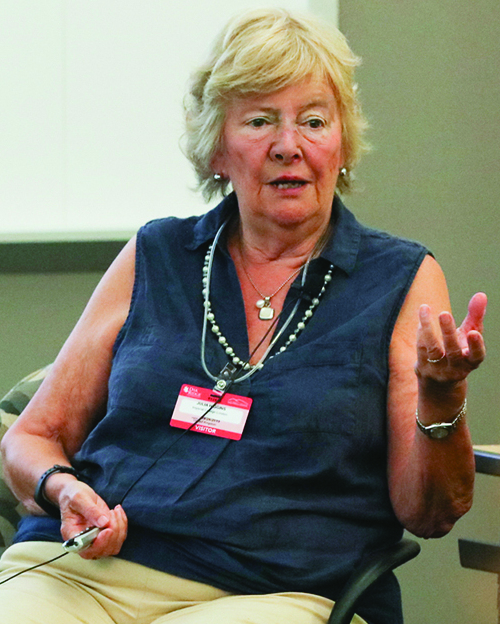
- Higgins in 2019
- Born: Julia Stretton Downes; 1 July 1942 (age 84); Surbiton, London, England
- Education: Somerville College, Oxford (MA, DPhil)
- Awards: Sir Frank Whittle Medal (2020); Holweck Prize (2006); DBE (2001); FRS (1995); FREng (1999)
- Scientific career
- Fields: Polymer science; Neutron scattering
- Workplaces: Imperial College London; University of Manchester; Institut Laue–Langevin
- Thesis: Inelastic scattering of neutrons from clathrate inclusion compounds and molecules in molecular sieves (1968)
- Website: www.imperial.ac.uk/people/j.higgins

Dame Julia Stretton Higgins (née Downes; born 1 July 1942) is a British polymer scientist. Since 1976, she has been based at the Department of Chemical Engineering at Imperial College London, where (since 2007) she is emeritus professor and senior research investigator.

== Education ==
Higgins was educated at the Ursuline High School, Wimbledon and Somerville College, Oxford where she was awarded Master of Arts and DPhil degrees.

== Career ==
In 1999, Higgins was elected as a member of the National Academy of Engineering for the application of neutron scattering and reflectivity to polymeric materials, and for service to the scientific community.

Higgins chaired the Advisory Committee on Mathematics Education (ACME) from 2008 to 2012. She is also a former chair (1998–2003) of the Athena Project, which aims for the advancement of women in science, engineering and technology (SET), in Higher Education. Between 2003 and 2007, she was also chair of the Engineering and Physical Sciences Research Council. Higgins was president of the Institution of Chemical Engineers 2002–03, and president of the British Association for the Advancement of Science 2003–04. She was elected a Fellow of the Royal Society in 1995, and was its foreign secretary 2001–06.

She is a Fellow of the Institution of Chemical Engineers, Institute of Materials, Minerals and Mining, the Royal Society of Chemistry and the Royal Academy of Engineering, and the City and Guilds of London Institute, of which she is Vice-President. She is an honorary fellow of the Institute of Physics and of Somerville College, Oxford.

She was appointed a CBE in 1996, before being named a dame in the 2001 Queen's Birthday Honours list. Dame Julia replaced Professor Adrian Smith FRS as ACME Chair in September 2008 when Adrian became Director General of Science and Research at the Department for Innovation, Universities and Skills. She holds honorary degrees from a number of UK universities and the University of Melbourne, Australia. Her scientific work has concentrated on the investigation of polymers with neutron scattering. She co-authored a monograph on that field (Higgins & Benoit 1997).

In April 2003, she became chair of the Engineering and Physical Sciences Research Council and was succeeded by John Armitt on 1 April 2007. In June 2006, Higgins was appointed principal of the Faculty of engineering at Imperial College London. The Faculty of engineering at Imperial College is one of the largest in the UK, comprising nine departments with 1,000 staff, over 4,200 students and an annual turnover of around £80 million. She is a member of the World Knowledge Dialogue Scientific Board, president of the ESPCI ParisTech Scientific Committee.

She is a Patron of WISE, a charitable organisation that encourages young women to pursue careers in Science, engineering and Construction, as well as a member of the Advisory Council for the Campaign for Science and Engineering. On the theme of women in science and engineering, Dame Julia, in May 2014, delivered a lecture entitled "How on Earth did I get here?" to Manchester Literary & Philosophical Society notes of it may be viewed

She served as president of the Institute of Physics from 1 October 2017 to 30 September 2019.

== Awards and honours ==
Higgins was elected a Fellow of the Royal Society in 1989. Her nomination reads:

After obtaining a first degree in Physics the candidate undertook research in the field of Physical Chemistry. She started using neutron scattering as a tool for investigating molecular structure and dynamics at this stage, first applying the techniques to the study of polymers while a post-doctoral research assistant in the Chemistry Department at Manchester. She was closely involved with the development of new techniques, their application in Polymer Science and the formation of an international community of scientists using these techniques while employed as a Physicist at the Institut Laue-Langevin, Grenoble. Since [sic] returning to the UK at Imperial she has built an internationally recognised group. She is well-known for her studies of the dynamics of polymer molecules, especially in the bulk state and, more recently the thermodynamics and demixing processes in polymer blends. Dr Higgins has a wonderful ability for recognizing when a new area of polymer science is ripe for experimental study and has a row of 'firsts' to her credit.

Other awards and honours include:

- Principal of the Faculty of engineering (2006–07)
- Chair of the engineering and Physical Sciences Research Council (2003 – April 2007)
- Trustee, National Gallery until 2010
- Trustee, Daphne Jackson Trust
- Fellow of the Royal Academy of Engineering
- Foreign member of the National Academy of Engineering of the United States
- Chevalier de la Légion d'honneur in 2003
- President, British Association for the Advancement of Science from 2003 until 2004.
- Received an honorary doctorate from Heriot-Watt University in 2000
- She is a foreign member of the National Academy of Engineering of the United States. She was named Dame Commander of the Order of the British Empire (DBE) in the 2001 Birthday Honours. In March 2010, the UKRC announced Professor Higgins as one of six Women of Outstanding Achievement in Science, engineering and Technology.
- A portrait of her by Tess Barnes was unveiled in June 2014 at Imperial College.
- In 1999 she was elected a Fellow of the Royal Academy of Engineering (FREng).
- She was chair of the Royal Society's 2008 State of the Nation Report Steering Group for 'Science and mathematics education 14–19'.
- In 2016, she was interviewed by Jim Al-Khalili on The Life Scientific.
- Awarded the Sir Frank Whittle Medal by the Royal Academy of engineering in 2020 "for her sustained excellence in polymer engineering".
