= British Maternal and Fetal Medicine Society =

Medical association based in the United Kingdom

- Established: 1996
- Address: 27 Sussex Place, Regent's Park, London, NW1 4RG, London, United Kingdom
- President: Professor Katie Morris
- Website: http://www.bmfms.org.uk

The British Maternal and Fetal Medicine Society (BMFMS) aims to provide a forum where issues of relevance to obstetricians and other professionals involved in pregnancy care are discussed. It seeks to:

- Disseminate knowledge
- Promote research and audit
- Encourage the interface with industry to promote technological advances
- Establish good quality training programmes
- Encourage development of clinical guidelines

The ultimate objective is to encourage improved standards of pregnancy care. The BMFMS provides a Maternal and Fetal Medicine input to a variety of Royal College of Obstetricians and Gynaecologists (RCOG) committees and has been involved in the development of the new ATSMs.

== History ==
=== Origins ===
In the early 1990s obstetricians were becoming less involved in the management of normal (‘low risk’) pregnancies where the majority, if not all, care was provided by midwives in the community. In contrast there were many developments in screening, diagnosis and management in problem (‘at risk’) pregnancies that obstetricians had to assimilate into their practice.

With this background in 1994, a survey was undertaken of all Members and Fellows of the RCOG to explore the support for a new Society which would provide a forum where the above issues of relevance to obstetricians and related health professionals could be discussed. The survey had an 80% response rate and over 90% of the responders supported the concept. Thus, the British Maternal and Fetal Medicine Society was born.

=== First meeting ===
The planning for the inaugural meeting took place via a series of meetings in David James' office in the Queen's Medical Centre during 1995 and early 1996. The first organising committee comprised people whom David knew and could persuade to get involved. They were Bryan Beattie (Cardiff), John Grant (Belshill), Ian Greer (Glasgow), Mary Pillai and Peter Soothill (Bristol), Steve Robson (Newcastle), Charles Rodeck and Phil Steer (London), David Taylor (Leicester), Steve Walkinshaw (Liverpool) and David James (Nottingham). One of the wisest parts of the planning was to appoint Bell Howe Conferences as the Conference Organiser. Diana Bell in particular was very helpful in guiding the society and she was a loyal supporter of the Society in its early days including taking the Minutes at meetings both of the Organising Committee and the Annual General Meeting of the Society itself.

The first meeting took place at Warwick University on 18–19 April 1996. With approximately 250 delegates, the meeting was a huge success and there was massive support for the Society and the annual meetings to continue. Positive features included:

- Obstetricians were pleased to have their own identity
- The size of the attendees was such that there could be effective ‘networking’ and all the oral presentations could be attended by all the delegates
- The four half day sessions covering Fetal Medicine, Maternal Medicine, Labour and Delivery and Postnatal and Pregnancy Outcome meant that there was ‘something for everybody’
- The deliberate plan to have an approximate 50:50 split between science and clinical material
- The high quality of the presentations,

== Core activities and responsibilities ==
=== Research ===
BMFMS does not have a formal research group but rather provides input into a number of clinical study groups (CSGs). This decision has been made because of major developments in the UK aimed at facilitating the conduct of high quality clinical trials and other well designed studies. Our committee has a strong representation within the UK Clinical Research Collaboration (UKCRC) and has been a leading driver in conjunction with the RCOG in the development of the National Reproductive Health Research Network (NRHRN) and a number of ‘pregnancy related’ CSGs

Professor Steve Thornton a member of the BMFMS Organising Committee (2004–2010) was instrumental in setting up the first CSG, the Preterm Birth CSG which the BMFMS provided initial funding for. The CSGs aim to set the national research agenda and to critically appraise and support research projects within the study group theme. The different CSGs within pregnancy care are:

- Fetal Medicine CSG (Sponsored by BMFMS)
- Intrapartum Care CSG (sponsored by BMFMS)
- Maternal Medicine CSG (Including Hypertensive disease)
- Preterm birth CSG (Sponsored by BAPM and Action Medical Research)
- Stillbirth CSG

All clinical research which is funded by a UKCRC partner (and this includes most UK national funding organisations who fund research through open national competition, including most research charities) are eligible for their study to be adopted on to the National Institute for Health and Care Research Clinical Research Network (NIHR CRN) Portfolio database. This is a database of all on-going studies giving information about the study and contact details of the investigators, as well as up-to-date recruitment information. General guidance about this national initiative can be found on the NIHR CRN's Portfolio website.

=== Trainees / students ===
The goal of the BMFMS is to improve standards of pregnancy care and trainees have a vital role to play in achieving this. The two trainee representatives on the BMFMS committee endorse trainees’ views and promote ways in which the society can support their needs. The BMFMS can help provide support, training, mentorship, as well as funding for research and travel grants. The trainee representatives want to ensure trainees and medical students benefit from society membership, become fully involved in society activities and can contribute to its success.

The trainee representative play and active role in committee meetings and the organisation of the conference. They are also involved on an annual basis in the RCOG careers fair which provides junior doctors and medical students with the opportunity to explore the career opportunities afforded by obstetrics and gynaecology.

The trainee representatives are initially elected to a three-year term of office. Any trainee who is a member of the BMFMS can stand for election in this position.
