= Lynne Frostick =

Chartered British geographer and geologist

Lynne Frostick CBE
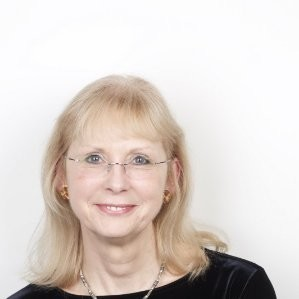
- Frostick in 2013
- Born: 2 February 1949 (age 77); Gillingham, England
- Citizenship: British
- Education: Dartford Grammar School; University of Leicester; University of East Anglia (PhD)
- Awards: Lyell Medal (2024)
- Scientific career
- Fields: Geography, geology
- Workplaces: University of Hull
- Thesis: Sediment Studies in the Deben Estuary, Suffolk, England (1975)

Lynne Elizabeth Frostick CBE (born 2 February 1949) is a chartered British geographer and geologist. She was a professor of Physical Geography at the University of Hull until 2014.

Her research interests include sediment and flow dynamics in rivers and estuaries and the interdisciplinary problems associated with waste. The physical modelling facility she has developed at The Deep is part of the EU HYDRALAB project.

Her activities outside of the university have included a seat on the editorial board of The Geographical Journal and chairing the government's Expert Group for Women in STEM. Frostick is on the chair of the British Society for Geomorphology. She is a member of the government's science careers expert group. In 2009 she received a UKRC Women of Outstanding Achievement Award. Frostick has published over one hundred papers and books, crossing disciplines including physics, mathematics and hydraulic engineering, as well as rift valleys, and sedimentology. She is currently a board member on the Environment Agency Board for Flood and Risk Coastal Risk Management. The Agency Board takes a cohesive approach to environmental protection and maintenance in England. Frostick applies her background in geology and environmental science to promote the well-being of others and the environment.

== Education ==
Frostick was educated at Dartford Grammar School for Girls for Secondary School from 1960 to 1966. She then attended the University of Leicester (BSc Geology, 1970), and completed her PhD in 1975 at the University of East Anglia with a thesis entitled "Sediment Studies in the Deben Estuary, Suffolk, England". She has a background in environmental science, which paved the way for her interest in geology and geography.

== Career ==
Frostick's first job was a docent at Birkbeck, University of London, from 1974 to 1987. She was a senior lecturer at Royal Holloway, University of London, from 1987 to 1990. She was then a senior lecturer at the University of Reading until 1996.

In addition to her academic work, Frostick was a member of the North East Regional Environmental Protection Advisory Committee from 1997 to 2006. She established her position as a leading woman in geology by being the first female Honorary Secretary from 1988 to 1991. She was the second female president of the Geological Society of London from 2008 to 2010.

She is currently working on "Human Impact and Channel shifting in Iran/Iraq".

When Frostick was an undergraduate in 1967, plate tectonic theory was not being taught. So, to explain the geological phenomenon of seafloor spreading, she was instead taught about eugeosynclines and miogeosynclines. Though she knew it did not fully explain the theory she did not give up on geology, and when the plate tectonic theory came to light, she knew the missing piece had been found. In the book In our time: The companion to the Radio 4 Series, Frostick goes in-depth about stochastic models and how they help predict where earthquakes might happen because of stress building up and increased seismic activity. However, she points out that we cannot say for sure when an earthquake will happen because it is quite difficult and it would shift from a stochastic model to a deterministic model.

When she was one of the six women awarded with "Women of Outstanding Achievement" in 2009, she stated that she was proud to be awarded in a male dominated field but wanted men to be better engaged. She also spoke about how women are forced to choose between family and career, and that since men do not have to make that choice, women should not either. Known as the environmental superwoman of Hull, she waited until she was awarded her promotions before she and her husband started a family.

She appeared in the documentary Ancient Apocalypse, offering her geological expertise on whether Sodom and Gomorah was actually possible based on rock displacements.

Frostick was appointed Commander of the Order of the British Empire (CBE) in the 2022 New Year Honours for services to flood risk and coastal erosion management.

== Selected publications ==
=== Articles ===
- Frostick, Lynne E.; Reid, Ian (1977). "The origin of horizontal laminae in ephemeral stream channel-fill". Sedimentology. 24 (1): 1–9. Bibcode:1977Sedim..24....1F. doi:10.1111/j.1365-3091.1977.tb00116.x.
- Frostick, Lynne E.; McCave, I. Nicholas (1979). "Seasonal shifts of sediment within an estuary mediated by algal growth". Estuarine and Coastal Marine Science. 9 (5): 569–576. Bibcode:1979ECMS....9..569F. doi:10.1016/0302-3524(79)90080-x.
- Reid, I.; Layman, J. T.; Frostick, L. E. (1980). "The Continuous Measurement of Bedload Discharge". Journal of Hydraulic Research. 18 (3): 243–249. Bibcode:1980JHydR..18..243R. doi:10.1080/00221688009499550.
- Frostick, Lynne; Reid, Ian (1983). "Taphonomic significance of sub-aerial transport of vertebrate fossils on steep semi-arid slopes". Lethaia. 16 (2): 157–164. Bibcode:1983Letha..16..157F. doi:10.1111/j.1502-3931.1983.tb01711.x.
- Frostick, Lynne E.; Lucas, P. M.; Reid, I. (1984). "The infiltration of fine matrices into coarse-grained alluvial sediments and its implications for stratigraphical interpretation". Journal of the Geological Society. 141 (6): 955–965. Bibcode:1984JGSoc.141..955F. doi:10.1144/gsjgs.141.6.0955.
- Reid, Ian; Frostick, Lynne E.; Layman, John T. (1985). "The incidence and nature of bedload transport during flood flows in coarse-grained alluvial channels". Earth Surface Processes and Landforms. 10 (1): 33–44. Bibcode:1985ESPL...10...33R. doi:10.1002/esp.3290100107.
- Reid, Ian; Frostick, Lynne E. (1986). "Dynamics of bedload transport in Turkey brook, a coarse-grained alluvial channel". Earth Surface Processes and Landforms. 11 (2): 143–155. Bibcode:1986ESPL...11..143R. doi:10.1002/esp.3290110205.
- Reid, I.; Frostick, L. E. (1987). "Flow dynamics and suspended sediment properties in arid zone flash floods". Hydrological Processes. 1 (3): 239–253. Bibcode:1987HyPr....1..239R. doi:10.1002/hyp.3360010303.
- Frostick, L. E.; Reid, I. (1987). "Tectonic control of desert sediments in rift basins ancient and modern". Geological Society, London, Special Publications. 35 (1): 53–68. Bibcode:1987GSLSP..35...53F. doi:10.1144/GSL.SP.1987.035.01.05.
- Frostick, L. E.; Steel, R. J. (1994). "Tectonic Signatures in Sedimentary Basin Fills: An Overview". Tectonic Controls and Signatures in Sedimentary Successions. pp. 1–9. doi:10.1002/9781444304053.ch1. ISBN 978-0-632-03745-2.
- Laronne, Jonathan B.; Reid, Ian; Yitshak, Yitshak; Frostick, Lynne E. (1994). "The non-layering of gravel streambeds under ephemeral flood regimes". Journal of Hydrology. 159 (1–4): 353–363. Bibcode:1994JHyd..159..353L. doi:10.1016/0022-1694(94)90266-6.
- Powell, D. Mark; Reid, Ian; Laronne, Jonathan B.; Frostick, Lynne (1996). "Bed load as a component of sediment yield from a semiarid watershed of the northern Negev" (PDF). IAHS Publications-Series of Proceedings and Reports-Intern Assoc Hydrological Sciences. 236: 389–398.
- Frostick, L.E. (1997). "Chapter 9. The east African rift basins". African Basins. Sedimentary Basins of the World. Vol. 3. pp. 187–209. doi:10.1016/S1874-5997(97)80012-3. ISBN 978-0-444-82571-1.
- Jones, S.J.; Frostick, L.E.; Astin, T.R. (2001). "Braided stream and flood plain architecture: The Rio Vero Formation, Spanish Pyrenees". Sedimentary Geology. 139 (3–4): 229–260. Bibcode:2001SedG..139..229J. doi:10.1016/S0037-0738(00)00165-2.
- Frostick, Lynne; Murphy, Brendan; Middleton, Richard (2008). "Exploring the links between sediment character, bed material erosion and landscape: Implications from a laboratory study of gravels and sand-gravel mixtures". Geological Society, London, Special Publications. 296 (1): 117–127. Bibcode:2008GSLSP.296..117F. doi:10.1144/SP296.8.
- Jones, Stuart J.; Frostick, Lynne E. (2008). "Inferring bedload transport from stratigraphic successions: Examples from Cenozoic and Pleistocene rivers, south central Pyrenees, Spain". Geological Society, London, Special Publications. 296 (1): 129–145. Bibcode:2008GSLSP.296..129J. doi:10.1144/SP296.9.
- Coulthard, T.J.; Frostick, L.E. (2010). "The Hull floods of 2007: Implications for the governance and management of urban drainage systems". Journal of Flood Risk Management. 3 (3): 223–231. Bibcode:2010JFRM....3..223C. doi:10.1111/j.1753-318X.2010.01072.x.
- Mao, Luca; Cooper, James R.; Frostick, Lynne E. (2011). "Grain size and topographical differences between static and mobile armour layers". Earth Surface Processes and Landforms. 36 (10): 1321–1334. Bibcode:2011ESPL...36.1321M. doi:10.1002/esp.2156.

=== Books ===
- Frostick, L. E.; Renaut, Robin W.; Reid, Ian, eds. (1986). Sedimentation in the African rifts. Oxford, UK: Published for the Geological Society by Blackwell Scientific Publications. ISBN 0632015349. LCCN 87118970; xiii+382 pages, illustrated
- Frostick, L. E.; Reid, I., eds. (1987). Desert sediments: ancient and modern. Geological Society special publication; no. 35. Oxford, UK: Published for the Geological Society by Blackwell Scientific Publications. ISBN 0632019050. LCCN 87011686; xi+401 pages, illustrated
- Frostick, L. E.; Steel, R. J., eds. (1993). Tectonic controls and signatures in sedimentary successions. Oxford: Blackwell Scientific Publications. ISBN 0632037458. LCCN 93007590; viii+520 pages, illustrated
- Jones, Stuart J.; Frostick, L. E, eds. (2002). Sediment flux to basins: causes, controls and consequences. London: Geological Society of London. ISBN 1862390959. LCCN 2002512154.
- Frostick, L. E.; McLelland, Stuart J.; Mercer, Theresa G., eds. (2011). Users guide to physical modelling and experimentation: experience of the HYDRALAB network. CRC Press. ISBN 9780415609128. LCCN 2010054312; xxv+245 pages, illustrated

== Sources ==
- Department for Environment, Food & Rural Affairs. (27 February 2015). Environment Agency Board appointment. Retrieved from https://www.gov.uk/government/news/environment-agency-board-appointment
- Hayvaert, Vanessa. Walstra, Jan. Parsons, Daniel. Frostick, Lynne. Woodbridge, Kevin. Verkinderen, Peter. Mortier, Clement. Jones, Matthew. Ooghe, Bart. Weerts, H. J. T. (2004–present, January) Geoarchaeology "Human impact and channel shifting, Iran/Iraq". Retrieved from https://www.researchgate.net/project/Geoarchaeology-Human-impact-and-channel-shifting-Iran-Iraq
- Bragg, Melvyn. (2009). In Our Time: The Companion to the Radio 4 Series. London, UK: Hodder & Stoughton.
- Kane, Annie. (27 February 2015). LYNNE FROSTICK AND EMMA HOWARD BOYD APPOINTED TO ENVIRONMENT AGENCY BOARD. Retrieved from https://resource.co/article/lynne-frostick-and-emma-howard-boyd-appointed-environment-agency-board-9876
- Corbyn, Zoe. (2 April 2009). "Fair-Minded". Retrieved from https://www.timeshighereducation.com/news/fair-minded/406025.article
