= Trudy Norris-Grey =

Welsh businesswoman

Trudy Norris-Grey is a Welsh businesswoman, and a leader in the global tech industry.

In 2020, Norris-Grey was appointed as UCAS' first independent chair of its board of trustees. In 2007, she was appointed the Chair of WISE (Women in Science, Engineering & Technology), a role she held until 2024. The WISE Campaign is aimed at encouraging more girls and women to consider important, satisfying and rewarding STEM (Science, Technology, Engineering, Medicine and Build Environment) career paths on which she has provided evidence to the UK Government and many other organisations.

== Early life ==
Trudy Norris-Grey was born in Morriston, Swansea, the seventh of eight children. She gained a degree in Business Studies, and after graduating, she completed the Certified Chartered Accountants examinations and qualified as an accountant.

== Education ==
Norris-Grey attended the University of South Wales, INSEAD Fontainebleau, Harvard Business School, Smith College, USA and the University of Cambridge, Judge Business School.

== Career ==
Norris-Grey's early career began in Racal Vodafone in 1983 as an audit accountant before moving to Digital Equipment Corporation in 1986, based in Reading. At Digital, she headed the Channels Finance group, before moving into a front line sales role. Her final position at Digital was on the UK board as General Manager of the Components and Peripherals division, Digital's first ever female board member. Norris-Grey then took a position with Kodak as Marketing Director for Europe, Middle East and Africa where she also opened new emerging market opportunities including in Africa and India. Norris-Grey joined Oracle in 2000 as its Vice President for Indirect Channels and Partners. After five successful years at Oracle, she was asked to head up Sun Microsystems UK and Ireland as its Managing Director and President, pioneering a route for other women to lead large technology businesses in the UK.

In 2008, she joined BT Wholesale as Managing Director responsible for strategy, new business and transformation, before moving to BT Global Services as Senior Vice President for Global Indirect Channels and Partners. In 2012, Norris-Grey joined Microsoft as its General Manager, responsible for its public sector business in Central and Eastern Europe, subsequently moving to the USA to lead Microsoft's global business development team for public sector and smart cities.

In addition, Norris-Grey has chaired the CBI's Committee on Innovation, Science & Technology, was a member of the Research Council's Funders Forum, and a founder member of the Corporate Leaders Group, where she was both a Government adviser on Sustainability and Carbon Emissions and head of the work group on Government Procurement for the Corporate Leaders Group, in addition to being a founder member of the CBI Leadership Group on Climate Change, and was a member of the UK Trade Minister's UK Infrastructure Forum. Norris-Grey was a member of the UK's National Careers Council, a member of the UK's Technology and Innovation Catapult Centre independent oversight committee, and was chief editor of the Wilson review on Business-University collaboration for the UK government, and a contributor to the Shadbolt Review of Computer Sciences Degree Accreditation and Graduate Employability. Additionally she was on the Science for All, Expert Group, under Sir Roland Jackson.

Norris-Grey was also on the board of Netherlands-based World Press Photo, whose aim is to inspire understanding of the world through photojournalism, and was an active Board Member of Junior Achievement Europe. She was a Non-Executive director for EA Technology Limited, having also been a Pension Trustee for Oracle and for Digital. In addition, she sat on the Welsh Government's Finance and Professional Services Sector Panel. Norris-Grey has debated the focusing of UK funding for science and innovation at the Royal Society, and has contributed to a Commons select committee inquiry on women in the workplace. Norris-Grey is a champion of equal opportunities. She is a regular speaker encouraging women and girls to discover the potential of careers in STEM.

Norris-Grey is a champion of equal opportunities. She is a regular speaker encouraging women and girls to discover the potential of careers in STEM.

== Awards ==
Norris-Grey was named as one of the top ten most influential women in UK Tech by Computer Weekly, and was also included in the 100 Welsh Women list "created to mark the contributions of women, past and present, who have made brilliant contributions to our national life". The Female FTSE Board Report published by Cranfield University recognised Norris-Grey as one of the Women to Watch 2017. She was one of the 30 women identified in the BCS Women in IT Campaign in 2014 and was then featured in the e-book of these 30 women in IT, Women in IT: Inspiring the next generation, produced by the BCS. In 2015, Norris-Grey was recognised by the Financial Times as a Notable Woman in IT, and also by Computer Weekly as the 11th most influential woman in IT. In 2016, Norris-Grey was again identified as one of the 50 most influential women in UK IT by Computer Weekly, one of the 10 Most Influential Women in IT in Computer Business and was also one of the Names to Know by Marie Claire.

In 2021, Norris-Grey was recognised for lifetime achievement and added to Computer Weekly's Hall of Fame. Norris-Grey was celebrated as an iconic Welsh woman in 2021. Learning organisation Firetech also celebrated Norris-Grey as one of the inspiring women in STEM around the world.

Norris-Grey was awarded Honorary Fellow of the University of South Wales in 2013, an Honorary Fellow of University of Wales Trinity Saint David in 2008 and an Honorary Fellow of Cardiff Metropolitan University in 2023. She was also made a Fellow of the (Royal Society of the Arts).

Norris-Grey was elected a Fellow of the Institution of Engineering and Technology in 2024.

== Personal life ==
Norris-Grey is married and mother to three children.
