= Carolin Crawford =

British physicist

- Born: Carolin Susan Crawford; 1963 (age 62–63); Guildford, England, United Kingdom
- Education: University of Cambridge (BA, PhD)
- Spouse: Andrew Fabian (m. 1991)
- Awards: Royal Society University Research Fellow (1996); Women of Outstanding Achievement Award (2009)
- Scientific career
- Fields: Astronomy
- Workplaces: University of Cambridge; Gresham College
- Thesis: The detection of distant cooling flows (1988)
- Website: people.ast.cam.ac.uk/~csc

Carolin Susan Crawford is a British communicator of science and astrophysicist. She is an emeritus member of the Institute of Astronomy, Cambridge and an emeritus fellow of Emmanuel College, Cambridge.

== Education ==
Crawford studied the Mathematical Tripos and received a Bachelor of Arts honours degree in mathematics at Newnham College, Cambridge in 1985. In 1988 she received her PhD for research undertaken at the Institute of Astronomy, Cambridge on cooling flows.

== Career and research ==
After her PhD, Crawford progressed through a series of postdoctoral and research fellowships at Balliol College, Oxford, the Institute of Astronomy, Trinity Hall, Cambridge and Newnham College, Cambridge. From 1996 to 2007 she held a Royal Society University Research Fellowship.

In 2004 she was appointed a Fellow and College Lecturer at Emmanuel College, Cambridge, where was also the undergraduate admissions tutor for the Physical Sciences. She held this position in conjunction with her role as Public Astronomer at the Institute of Astronomy, which she first took on in 2005.

She served as Gresham Professor of Astronomy at Gresham College from 2011 to 2015, a position in which she delivered free public lectures on astronomy and astrophysics in the City of London.

Crawford's "primary research interests are in combining X-ray, optical and near-infrared observations to study the physical processes occurring around massive galaxies at the core of clusters of galaxies. In particular, she observes the complex interplay between the hot intra-cluster medium, filaments of warm ionized gas, cold molecular clouds, star formation and the radio plasma flowing out from the central supermassive black hole."

=== Outreach and awards ===
Crawford delivers public lectures, talks, workshops and debates throughout the UK and beyond on wide range of topics within astronomy. She regularly delivers such science outreach presentations to over 4,000 people annually. She is a regular in broadcast media, with numerous appearances on programmes such as In Our Time and Home Planet on BBC Radio 4.

In 2009 Crawford was recognised for her outstanding abilities at science communication by a Women of Outstanding Achievement Award by the UK Resource Centre for Women in Science, Engineering and Technology, presented for “communication of science with a contribution to society.”
