= Joan Mott =

- Born: 9 January 1921; Parkstone, Dorset, England
- Died: 21 April 1994 (aged 73); Headington, Oxford, Oxfordshire, England
- Education: Cheltenham Ladies' College, Newnham College, Cambridge
- Scientific career
- Fields: physiology and zoology
- Workplaces: Nuffield Institute for Medical Research, University of Oxford

Joan Mott (9 January 1921–21 April 1994) was an English physiologist and zoologist. She worked for most of her career at the University of Oxford's Nuffield Institute for Medical Research and was a founding fellow and Vicegerent of Wolfson College, Oxford.

== Biography ==
Mott was born on 9 January 1921 at Parkstone, Dorset. She was educated Cheltenham Ladies' College and then studied at Newnham College, University of Cambridge.

Mott worked for the majority of her career at the University of Oxford's Nuffield Institute for Medical Research. Following wartime work on anti-fouling of ships her main research interest was in the circulatory system, especially the fetal renin–angiotensin system. She studied the breathing movements in nephrectomised lamb foetuses and tested the response to haemorrhaging in altricial species (rabbits) and the otprecocial species (sheep). She was Secretary of the Neonatal Society from 1963 to 1967.

Mott was a founding fellow of and Vicegerent of Wolfson College, Oxford.

Mott died on 21 April 1994 at Headington, Oxford, Oxfordshire.

The biennial Joan Mott Prize Lecture Celebrating Women Physiologists, hosted by The Physiological Society, is named in her honour. The event was established in 1995 and is funded by a bequest from her will.

== Selected publications ==
- G. S. Dawes; Joan C. Mott; J. G. Widdicombe; D. G. Wyatt (1 July 1953). "Changes in the lungs of the new-born lamb". The Journal of Physiology. 121 (1): 141–162. doi:10.1113/jphysiol.1953.sp004936. ISSN 0022-3751. PMC 1366061. PMID 13085305. Wikidata Q73260990.
- G. S. Dawes; Joan C. Mott; Heather J. Shelley (1 June 1959). "The importance of cardiac glycogen for the maintenance of life in foetal lambs and newborn animals during anoxia". The Journal of Physiology. 146 (3): 516–538. doi:10.1113/jphysiol.1959.sp006208. ISSN 0022-3751. PMID 13665675. Wikidata Q78704147.
- S. CASSIN; G. S. DAWES; J. C. MOTT; B. B. ROSS; L. B. STRANG (1 May 1964). "The vascular resistance of the foetal and newly ventilated lung of the lamb". The Journal of Physiology. 171: 61–79. doi:10.1113/jphysiol.1964.sp007361. ISSN 0022-3751. PMC 1368776. PMID 14170145. Wikidata Q76854018.
- G. S. Dawes; J. C. Mott; J. G. Widdicombe (1 November 1951). "Respiratory and cardiovascular reflexes from the heart and lungs". The Journal of Physiology. 115 (3): 258–291. doi:10.1113/jphysiol.1951.sp004670. ISSN 0022-3751. PMC 1392066. PMID 14898511. Wikidata Q75949463.
