= Janet Abbate =

American professor of science and technology studies

Janet Abbate (born June 3, 1962) is a professor of science, technology, and society at Virginia Tech. Her research focuses on the history of computer science and the Internet, particularly on the participation of women in the field. Janet Abbate is also the author of Inventing the Internet (MIT Press, 1999), Standards Policy for Information Infrastructure (MIT Press, 1995), and Recoding Gender : Women’s Changing Participation in Computing (MIT Press, 2012). Janet Abbate attended The University of Pennsylvania for her Ph.D.

== Academic career ==
Abbate received her bachelor's degree from Radcliffe College and her master's degree from the University of Pennsylvania. She also received her Ph.D. in American Civilization from the University of Pennsylvania in 1994. From 1996 to 1998, she was a postdoctoral fellow with the IEEE History Center, where she conducted research on women in computing. She joined the faculty of Virginia Tech's Northern Capital Region campus in 2004 and is now a professor and the co-director of the graduate program in Science, Technology, and Society. Janet Abbate earned a BA from Harvard University, a MA from the University of Pennsylvania, and a PhD from the University of Pennsylvania.

Prior to her academic work, Abbate was a computer programmer herself. Her background in computer programming has influenced her research approach and has been cited as relevant in reviews of her work.

== Research and publications ==
In 1995, Abbate co-edited Standards Policy for Information Infrastructure with Brian Kahin. Some of her main areas of research focus include: Gender in Science and Technology, History of Computing the Internet, and Labor Issues in Science and Technology.

Janet Abbate is currently researching historical emergence of computer science as an intellectual discipline.

=== Inventing the Internet ===
In 2000, she published her first book, Inventing the Internet (2000) Inventing the Internet was widely reviewed as an important work in the history of computing and networking, particularly in highlighting the role of social dynamics and of non-American participation in early networking development. The book was also praised for its use of archival resources to tell the history.

Though some have criticized the work, citing Abbate’s computer programming background as causing issues in presenting a non-technical narrative. She has since written about the need for historians to be aware of the perspectives they take in writing about the history of the Internet and explored the implications of defining the Internet in terms of “technology, use and local experience” rather than through the lens of the spread of technologies from the United States.

=== Recording Gender ===
Her second book, Recoding Gender: Women’s Changing Participation in Computing (2012). "explores how gender has shaped computing and suggests how the experiences of female pioneers can inform current efforts to broaden participation in science and technology." The book includes research from her post-doctoral fellowship at IEEE where she conducted 52 oral histories with American and British women in computing from 2001–2003. The IEEE History Center collaborated on the project and now hosts the interviews on ETHW.

Notable interviewees include:

- Frances Allen
- Jean Bartik
- Barbara Liskov
- Karen Spärck Jones
- Dame Stephanie Shirley
- Pamela Morton
- Jean Sammet

Recoding Gender received positive reviews, especially for its incorporation of interviews with women in the field and for providing a historical overview of how women and gender have shaped computer programming. However, the book has also been criticized for being disjointed—that the link of "women in computing” is not strong enough to hold the different chapters together. The book received the 2014 Computer History Museum prize.

== See also ==
- History of the Internet
- Protocol Wars
