= Health Technology Assessment (journal) =

- Language: English
- Edited by: Dr Cat Chatfield

Publication details
- History: 1997-present
- Publisher: National Institute for Health and Care Research (United Kingdom)
- Frequency: Weekly
- Open access: Yes
- Impact factor: 3.5 (2022)

Standard abbreviations
- ISO 4: Health Technol. Assess.

Indexing
- ISSN: 1366-5278 (print); 2046-4924 (web)
- OCLC no.: 36731562

Links
- Journal homepage; Online archive

Health Technology Assessment is a weekly peer-reviewed open access medical journal published by the National Institute for Health and Care Research (NIHR), a research partner of the United Kingdom National Health Service. It publishes research on the evaluations of health technologies, their effectiveness, cost and broader impact. The journal was established in 1997 and the editor-in-chief is John Powell (NIHR). According to the Journal Citation Reports, the journal has a 2015 impact factor of 4.058. The journal, along with four others, is part of the NIHR Journals Library.
