= Waljit Dhillo =

English endocrinologist

- Scientific career
- Fields: endocrinology
- Institutions: Imperial College London, National Institute for Health Research

Waljit Dhillo FRCP FMedSci is an endocrinologist and a Professor of Endocrinology & Metabolism at the Imperial College London. He is the Director of Research at the Division of Medicine & Integrated Care at Imperial College Healthcare NHS Trust and the Dean of the National Institute for Health and Care Research (NIHR) Academy. His research focuses on how the endocrine system controls body weight and reproductive functions.

== Early life and education ==
Dhillo studied at the St Bartholomew's Hospital Medical College, University of London. He received a BSc in biochemistry in 1991 and an MBBS in Clinical Pharmacology & Therapeutics in 1994. He acquired a PhD in neuroendocrinology at the Imperial College in 2002.

== Career and research ==
Dhillo works at the Imperial College London, the Imperial College Healthcare NHS Trust and the National Institute for Health and Care Research (NIHR). Since 2023 he is the Scientific Director for Research Capacity and Capabilities at the NIHR Board. In 2024 he was appointed the NIHR Scientific Director for Research Capacity and Capabilities.

He is a Fellow of the Higher Education Academy (FHEA), the Royal College of Physicians (FRCP), and the Royal College of Pathologists (FRCPath). He was awarded an NIHR Research Professorship in 2015 and appointed Senior Investigator in 2021. In 2024 he was elected as a Fellow of the Academy of Medical Sciences.

Dhillo's research focuses on how gut hormones regulate the feeling of hunger and the consequent amount of food intake. His research investigates the possible use of gut hormones as medicine that, when administered, would suppress appetite with less side effects than other drugs. More recently he researched the use of kisspeptin treatment for infertile women undergoing in vitro fertilization, and the role of neurokinin B in the hot flush symptoms of menopausal women. His research paved the way for the development of fezolinetant, a drug for the treatment of hot flushes in menopause. He also takes part in the development of the drug MVT-602, a potential treatment for reproductive problems in women.
