= Pearson Sound =

British producer and DJ

David Kennedy (born 1988), professionally known as Pearson Sound, is an electronic dance music producer, mix engineer and DJ based in the UK. His style is a combination of house, dubstep, UK funky, UK garage and jungle. In October 2024, a review of his EP release stated: "Which Way Is Up cements Pearson Sound's position as one of UK electronic music's all time greats."

== Career ==
Early in his career, Kennedy released some music under the names Ramadanman (until 2010) and Maurice Donovan. He has worked under the Pearson Sound alias since 2008 and tracks under old and new names featured in his FabricLive.56 mix. He has released several acclaimed EPs and singles, including "Blanked", "Deep Inside" and "Thaw Cycle". He has completed remixes for artists such as Radiohead, Depeche Mode, the XX, Disclosure and MIA, on labels including XL, Warner and Columbia. He was voted by the public as one of Resident Advisor's top 100 DJs in the world in both 2010 and 2011.

In 2007, he founded the record label Hessle Audio with Ben Thomson (Ben UFO) and Kevin McAuley (Pangaea). Since then, Hessle Audio have been featured regularly in major dance music publications, as well as touring across the world. On their 15th anniversary in 2022, a cover feature in Crack magazine stated: "Pound for pound, Hessle Audio are surely the most influential British club label of their generation".

Kennedy released his debut self-titled album in 2015 on Hessle Audio. The album was well received critically and scored 8.1 by the website Pitchfork. His single "XLB" was voted as the second best track of 2016 by Resident Advisor.

Kennedy makes regular appearances on BBC Radio 1 who describe him as a 'key figure in the [UK bass] scene', as well as co-hosting a regular show on London's Rinse FM.

Aside from DJing, producing and mixing, Kennedy also ran for many years a vinyl-only club night called Acetate at the Leeds nightclub Wire, featuring guests such as Gilles Peterson and Four Tet, and he was a headline act at the club's final club night weekend before its closure in June 2024.

== Personal life ==
Kennedy was brought up in north London and studied at Highgate School and the University of Leeds. His mother is the civil engineer Joanna Kennedy.

== Discography ==
=== Albums ===
- Pearson Sound (2015), Hessle Audio

=== EPs ===
- "Heat" / "Heat (Extended Mix)" / "Heat (Autumns Remix)" (October 2026) with Marie Davidson
- "Hornet" / "Twister" / "Slingshot" / "Which Way Is Up" (2024)
- "Red Sky" / "Sinkhole" / "Freefall" / "Around in Circles" (2022)
- "Alien Mode" / "Cobwebs" / "Everything Inside Out" (2020)
- "Rubble" / "Earwig" / "Our Spirits Soar" (2018)
- "Robin Chasing Butterflies" / "Eels" / "Heal Me" (2017)
- "REM" / "Gridlock" / "Figment" / "Crimson (Beat Ritual Mix)" (2013)
- "Lola" / "Power Drumsss" / "Starburst" (2013)
- "Clutch" / "Underdog" / "Piston" (2012)

=== Singles ===
- "Heat" (October 2026) with Marie Davidson
- "Zoomies" (2025)
- "Hornet" (2024)
- "XLB" (2016)
- "Thaw Cycle" / "Freeze Cycle" (2015)
- "Raindrops" (2014)
- "Quivver" (2013)
- "Untitled" / "Footloose" (2012)
- "Faint", with Joy Orbison and Boddika (2012)
- "Deep Inside" / "Working With" (2011)
