= Changing Channels (Pangaea album) =

Studio album by Pangaea
- Released: 6 October 2023
- Length: 31:47
- Label: Hessle Audio
- Producer: Kevin McAuley

Pangaea chronology
In Drum Play (2016)	Changing Channels (2023)

Singles from Changing Channels
- 1. "Installations" Released: 16 May 2023; 2. "Changing Channels" Released: 13 June 2023; 3. "Hole Away" Released: 13 June 2023; 4. "Bad Lines" Released: 12 September 2023

Changing Channels is the second studio album by English dubstep musician Pangaea. It was released on 6 October 2023, through Hessle Audio.

== Background and singles ==
On 16 May 2023, only a few months after the release of the two-track EP Fuzzy Logic / Still Moving Water, the musician released the first single and intro of the album "Installations." With its "chopped-up vocals," the track was created as a nod to his 2011 single "Hex." McAuley shared the news of the album on 13 June 2023. That day also saw the release of two singles: the title-track and "Hole Away," songs that he described as "tried and tested over the past few weeks and months." To the musician, the album felt like it "distilled all the different elements of" his music of the previous 15 years and called it his "most complete record to date." Upon announcing the album, it was seen as a fusion of "bass abstraction with dynamic, sometimes abrasive club frequencies." On 12 September, McAuley released a third single titled "Bad Lines," a "happy hardcore salute" that blends UK dance music "with his own unique brand of world-building." The album artwork was created by visual artist Michał Ratajczak.

== Critical reception ==
Professional ratings
Review scores
Source	Rating
Pitchfork	8.3/10

Writing for Pitchfork, Philip Sherburne awarded Changing Channels the accolade "Best New Music," saying Pangaea created a record that avoids what other mainstream "chart-pop samples" or "Eurodance classics" are guilty of: "a vaguely guilty-pleasure insinuation of getting away with something naughty." Sherburne opined that the album captures "a welcome shift in flow" while being proof that one "can get silly without sounding stupid."

In Resident Advisor, Changing Channels is described as an album that "takes McAuley's deft touch to route-one house, breakbeat techno and happy hardcore.

Pitchfork ranked it the 36th best album of 2023.

== Track listing ==
Changing Channels track listing
No.	Title	Length
1.	"Installation"	3:43
2.	"Hole Away"	3:31
3.	"If"	5:08
4.	"The Slip"	3:50
5.	"Changing Channels"	7:14
6.	"Squid"	4:31
7.	"Bad Lines"	3:50
Total length:		31:47
