= Lucy Chappell =

British obstetrician and gynaecologist, researcher and chief executive officer

Professor Lucy Chappell FRCOG FMedSci
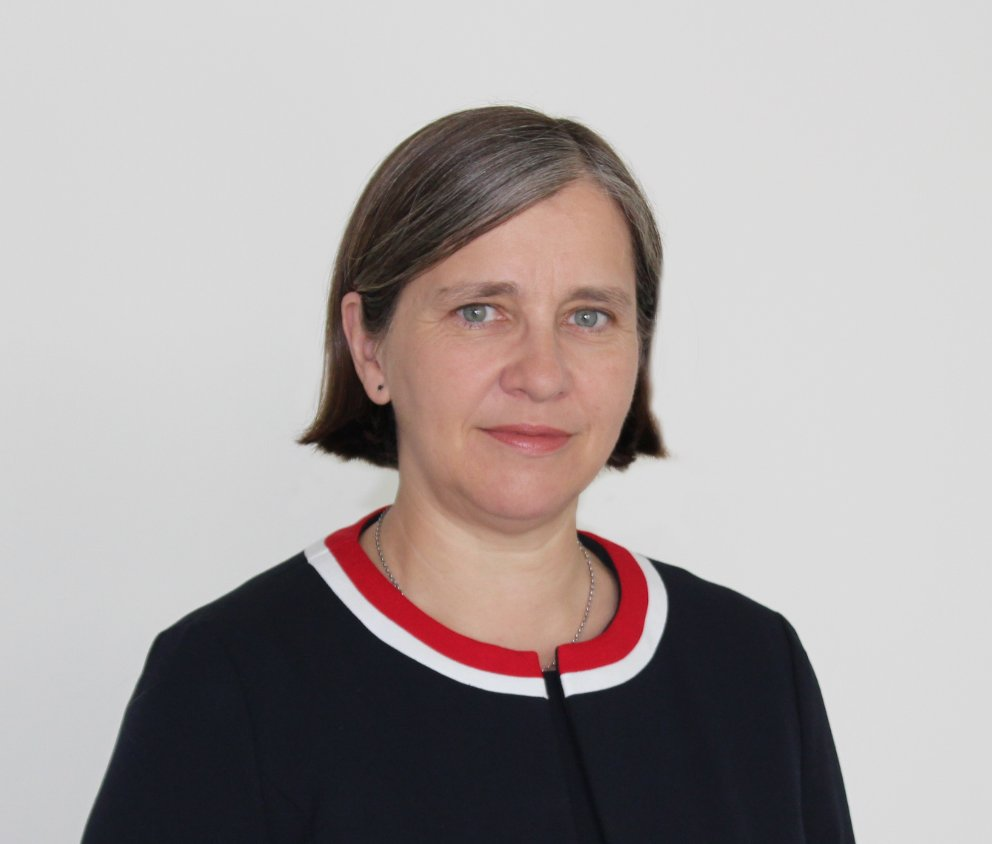
- Education: St Thomas's Hospital Medical School; University of Cambridge School of Clinical Medicine; King's College London
- Known for: Chief Scientific Adviser for the UK Department of Health and Social Care
- Scientific career
- Fields: Obstetrics; Academic administration
- Workplaces: NIHR; King's College London
- Doctoral advisor: Lucilla Poston

Lucy Chappell is a British professor of obstetrics at King’s College London and the Chief Scientific Adviser (CSA) for the UK Department of Health and Social Care. As part of her CSA role, she oversees the National Institute for Health and Care Research (NIHR) as Chief Executive Officer. Her research areas include medical problems during pregnancy such as pre-eclampsia, and the safety of medicines in pregnancy.

== Early life and education ==
Chappell received her education at Guy's and St Thomas’ Medical School in London and later at the University of Cambridge. Her PhD focused on prevention of pre-eclampsia and included work on the placental growth factor. She also completed a subspeciality training in maternal–fetal medicine and acquired a Master's degree in education from King's College London.

== Research and career ==
Chappell holds the positions of Senior Investigator for the NIHR, Honorary Consultant Obstetrician at Guy's and St. Thomas' NHS Foundation Trust, and Professor of Obstetrics at King's College London. She directs a research program that uses observational studies and randomised controlled trials to investigate the prediction and prevention of unfavorable pregnancy outcomes, particularly in women with pre-existing co-morbidities such chronic hypertension and chronic renal disease.

She has been a member of the Royal College of Obstetricians and Gynaecologists (RCOG) since 2002 and a fellow since 2017. She was the President of the Blair Bell Research Society, affiliated to the RCOG, from 2018 to 2021. Her editorial work includes being a board member at the Journal of the Royal Society of Medicine and formerly at PLoS Medicine.

Chappell participated as national pregnancy lead investigator for the RECOVERY Trial, a major trial that looked into possible COVID-19 infection therapies. Since August 2021 she works as Chief Scientific Adviser (CSA) at the Department of Health and Social Care and CEO of the NIHR.

=== Awards and honours ===
- NIHR Senior Investigator
- NIHR Research Professorship
- Gold Medal, Blair Bell Research Society
- Elected Fellow of the Academy of Medical Sciences, 2020

== Selected publications ==
- L C Chappell; Paul Seed; A L Briley; et al. (1 September 1999). "Effect of antioxidants on the occurrence of pre-eclampsia in women at increased risk: a randomised trial". The Lancet. 354 (9181): 810–816. doi:10.1016/s0140-6736(99)80010-5. ISSN 0140-6736. PMID 10485722. Wikidata Q57624866.
- Lucy C Chappell; Suzy Duckworth; Paul Seed; et al. (1 November 2013). "Diagnostic accuracy of placental growth factor in women with suspected preeclampsia: a prospective multicenter study". Circulation. 128 (19): 2121–2131. doi:10.1161/circulationaha.113.003215. ISSN 0009-7322. PMID 24190934. Wikidata Q45747422.
- Kate E Duhig; Jenny Myers; Paul Seed; et al. (1 April 2019). "Placental growth factor testing to assess women with suspected pre-eclampsia: a multicentre, pragmatic, stepped-wedge cluster-randomised controlled trial". The Lancet. 393 (10183): 1807–1818. doi:10.1016/s0140-6736(18)33212-4. ISSN 0140-6736. PMC 6497988. PMID 30948284. Wikidata Q64067071.
