= Barbara Casadei =

British cardiovascular physician

Barbara Casadei FRCP FMedSci
- Born: November 6, 1959 (age 66)
- Education: University of Oxford (DPhil)
- Awards: Joan Mott Prize Lecture (2004)
- Scientific career
- Workplaces: University of Oxford; Imperial College London
- Thesis: Some aspects of the parasympathetic control of the cardiovascular system in man (1995)
- Doctoral advisor: Peter Sleight
- Website: profiles.imperial.ac.uk/b.casadei

Barbara Casadei (born 6 November 1959) is a British physician who is British Heart Foundation (BHF) Professor of Cardiovascular Medicine at Imperial College London. Until 2024, she was based in the Radcliffe Department of Medicine at University of Oxford. In 2024, she became the Head of the National Heart and Lung Institute at Imperial College London.. Barbara is also Editor-in-Chief of JAMA Cardiology.

== Education ==
Casadei was awarded an academic scholarship to study medicine at the Collegio Nuovo of the University of Pavia, Italy. She graduated cum Laude in 1984 and then went on to a tenure-track training post in the University Department of Medicine in Varese, Italy. She moved to Oxford in 1989 to further her clinical and research training. She was awarded the Joan and Richard Doll Fellowship at Green College, Oxford in 1991, a Doctor of Philosophy (DPhil) in Cardiovascular Medicine at Pembroke College, Oxford in 1995.

== Career and research ==
She was awarded a BHF Senior Research Fellowship in 2001. She is a fellow of the Royal College of Physicians since 2001 and a professor in Cardiovascular Medicine at the University of Oxford since 2006. She was awarded a BHF Chair in Cardiovascular Medicine in 2012 and elected to the Fellowship of the UK Academy of Medical Sciences (FMedSci) in 2013.

Casadei is currently Deputy Head of Division of Cardiovascular Medicine in Oxford. She provides a clinical service at the Oxford University Hospitals NHS Trust's John Radcliffe Hospital and leads a bench-to-bedside translational research programme focussed on atrial fibrillation, which spans from clinical trials to bench-based investigation in human tissue and cells.

Casadei was elected President of the European Society of Cardiology, for the 2018–2020 term.

=== Awards and honours ===
- 1990-91 Research Fellowship of the European Society of Cardiology (ESC)
- 1991 Syntex Award for Initiatives in Cardiology, UK
- 1991-94 Joan and Richard Doll Research Fellowship, Green College, Oxford
- 1994 Young Research Workers Prize of the British Cardiac Society.
- 1995 Gold Medal for academic excellence (Medaglia Teresiana) of the University of Pavia, Italy.
- 1997 Fellowship of the European Society of Cardiology (FESC)
- 2004 The Joan Mott Prize Lecture of The Physiological Society, UK
- 2007 The Valsalva Prize Lecture of the Italian Society of Cardiovascular Research, Italy
- 2013 The William Harvey Lecture and Silver Medal of the ESC
- 2014 The Thomas Lewis Lecture and Silver Medal of the British Cardiovascular Society
- 2015 The Carmeliet-Coraboeuf-Weidmann Lecture of the WG on Cardiac Cellular Electrophysiology.
- 2016 The Frontiers in Cardiovascular Biology Keynote Lecture of ESC Basic Science Council
- 2017 The Brutsaert Lecture of the Heart Failure Association of the ESC.
