= Beryl Platt, Baroness Platt of Writtle =

Politician; life peer

The Right Honourable The Baroness Platt of Writtle CBE DL FRSA FREng HonFIMechE

Member of the House of Lords
- Lord Temporal
- Life peerage 28 May 1981 – 1 February 2015

Personal details
- Born: Beryl Catherine Myatt; 18 April 1923 Leigh-on-Sea, Essex, England, UK
- Died: 1 February 2015 (aged 91)
- Spouse: Stewart Sydney Platt
- Children: Roland Francis Platt (1951–2014); Victoria Catherine Platt (b. 1953)
- Engineering career
- Discipline: Mathematics, aeronautics, politics
- Institutions: Girton College, Cambridge
- Employers: Hawker Aircraft Company, British European Airways

Beryl Catherine Platt, Baroness Platt of Writtle CBE DL FRSA FREng HonFIMechE (née Myatt; 18 April 1923 – 1 February 2015) was a British Conservative politician and member of the House of Lords. Her background was in engineering, and she worked in aeronautics and aviation safety. She retained a strong interest in science and technology, particularly the role and advancement of women in these fields.

== Early life ==
Beryl Catherine Myatt was born at Leigh-on-Sea on 18 April 1923. Platt was educated at Westcliff High School for Girls in Southend-On-Sea, Essex where her favourite subject was mathematics. The headmistress of Westcliff predicted that this "outstanding pupil" had a university future ahead of her at Cambridge but, despite excellent exam results, the outbreak of the Second World War led to a hiatus in Platt's education. With the fear of German invasion, Platt and her family moved away from the coast and she spent a year at Slough High School for Girls (nowadays Upton Court Grammar School), where she initially gained entrance to read Mathematics at Cambridge.

== Education ==
In July 1941, the government announced a state bursary – including £25 per week pocket money – for engineering undergraduates to help the war effort, and in the hope that more engineers would be needed to re-build Britain after the war. Platt is quoted as describing this sum as "a fortune to me at the time", and chose to switch her studies to Aeronautical Engineering.

When Platt arrived at Girton College, Cambridge, she was one of five women amongst 250 men studying Mechanical Sciences (now Engineering); she was only the ninth woman to be accepted since her original predecessor in the First World War. Wartime necessity meant the course was reduced to an intensive two years, including for Platt three weeks' experience on the shop floor of the Hawker Aircraft Company. When Platt completed her engineering studies in 1943 women did not receive the same honours as their male counterparts: she was not awarded a degree, only a 'Title of degree'. It was not until five years later, in 1948, that women were admitted to degrees at Cambridge.

== Aeronautical career ==
Upon graduation in 1943, Platt was advised by C. P. Snow in his role at the University of Cambridge Appointments Board (a sort of careers advisory service) to contribute to the war effort and so Platt choose to return to the Hawker factory. This was the beginning of six years of work between 1943 and 1949 as a technical assistant in the aviation industry.

Platt's first job was at Hawkers Experimental Flight Test Department, where she was one of only three women in the department, working alongside men who had left school at fourteen but were highly skilled technicians and craftsmen. Platt's wage for a nominal forty-eight-hour week, in practice extending to all hours, was less than three pounds. Platt worked on the testing and production of three of the RAF's outstanding fighter planes of the time: the Hurricane, the Typhoon, and the Tempest V, the latter being the first conventional aircraft to counter the German V-1 pilotless jet missiles.

After the end of the war, Hawker's brilliant chief designer Sidney Camm offered Platt a continued role at Hawkers but Platt declined, preferring to move from war planes to investigating air safety for British European Airways. Some of her analyses were models of their kind, for instance charting procedures to ensure safe landings if an engine failed on take-off or over mountains. Platt quickly established herself as a perfectionist and a distinguished engineer. In 1951, she was elected to membership of the Women's Engineering Society.

In 1949, Platt married Stewart Sydney Platt, marking the end of her professional career in aeronautical engineering. Platt became a housewife, and a mother of two children.

Once Platt's children began at school she considered a return to the aircraft industry but there were none to be found within range of Writtle, the village where she lived. Instead, Platt turned her hand to politics, although she continued her interest in science and technology.

== Political career ==
Platt's political career began very locally through her membership of the parochial church council and so she was surprised to be nominated for a sudden vacancy on Chelmsford Rural District Council in 1956, a role she held until 1974. In 1965, Platt was elected to Essex County Council and held this role until 1968, when she was appointed to the office of Alderman of the Essex County Council from 1969 and 1974. Platt was also appointed chairman of the Essex County Council between 1971 and 1980.

Platt was created a life peer taking the title Baroness Platt of Writtle, of Writtle in the County of Essex and joined the House of Lords on 28 May 1981. She chose the title Baroness Platt of Writtle, after her home village in Essex, and a cogwheel as her coat of arms, symbolising her life of service as an engineer. On 24 June 1981, less than a month after joining the House, Platt made her maiden speech on a "subject very close to [her] heart", that of higher and further education.

Platt was a member of the European Communities Advisory Committee on Equal Opportunities for Women and Men between 1983 and 1988 and became chair of the Equal Opportunities Commission (EOC) in 1983. In 1984, as a result of encouragement from the Finniston Report, the EOC together with the Engineering Council set up WISE – Women into Science and Engineering. The initiative was very much spearheaded by Platt and was established to highlight the career opportunities for girls and women in science and engineering professions.

Platt was an active member of the House of Lords and between 1990 and 2008 she served on a number of committees relating to science, technology and engineering, including the Select Committee on Science and Technology. From 5 October 2010, Platt was on a leave of absence. and she died on 1 February 2015.

== Honours and appointments ==
Platt was a member of the council of the City and Guilds of London Institute between 1974 and 1994. She was a member of the Cambridge University Appointments Board between 1975 and 1979. She was appointed a Commander of the Order of the British Empire (CBE) in the 1978 Birthday Honours.

Platt has been awarded numerous of honorary fellowships and doctorates including an Honorary Fellow of the Institute of Mechanical Engineers (Hon.F.I.Mech.E.) in 1984, an honorary degree of Doctor of Science (D.Sc.) by City University, London, in 1984 an honorary degree of Doctor of Engineering (D.Eng.) by Bradford University, an honorary degree of Doctor of Technology (D.Tech.) by Brunel University in 1986, an honorary degree of Doctor of Laws (LL.D.) by University of Cambridge in 1987, a Fellow of the Royal Academy of Engineering (F.R.Eng.) in 1988, an Honorary Fellow at Girton College, Cambridge in 1988, and a Fellow of the Royal Society of Arts (F.R.S.A.). On 16 July 2008, Platt was awarded an honorary degree of Doctor of Science (D.Sc.) by the University of Southampton.

She was given the Freedom of the City of London in 1988. She was also made a liveryman of the Worshipful Company of Engineers in 1988. Between 1984 and 1992, she was Vice-President of the University of Manchester Institute of Science and Technology and between 1994 and 2001 Platt was Chancellor of Middlesex University.

== Publications ==
- Women in Technology (1984)

== Arms ==
Coat of arms of Beryl Platt, Baroness Platt of Writtle

Escutcheon
Vert four Seaxes in cross their blades outwards proper Hilts Quillons and Pommels Or and as many Aerofoils in saltire Argent all between four Plates
Supporters
Dexter: perched upon the Stock of an Anchor a Kingfisher wings elevated and addorsed proper; Sinister: a Lion the wings also elevated and addorsed supporting a Patriarchal Cross Gules
Compartment
A Grassy Mount springing therefrom Founts of Water proper
Motto
Aime Dieu Et Tous (Love God and everyone)

== Further sources and reading ==
- "Ms Beryl Platt (Hansard)". Parliamentary Debates (Hansard).
- "WOMEN MEMBERS OF THE HOUSE OF LORDS – Centre for Advancement of Women in Politics". Queen's University, Belfast.

Government offices
Preceded by Betty Lockwood	Chair of the Equal Opportunities Commission; 1983–1988	Succeeded by Joanna Foster
