= WISE Campaign =

United Kingdom non-profit organization

- Women into Science and Engineering Campaign
- Abbreviation: WISE
- Formation: 17 January 1984
- Founder: Baroness Platt of Writtle, Engineering Council, Equal Opportunities Commission
- Type: Registered charity
- Purpose: To
- Headquarters: Leeds College of Building
- Location: Leeds, United Kingdom
- Key people: Trudy Norris-Grey (Chair); Anne-Marie Imafidon (CEO)
- Website: www.wisecampaign.org.uk

The WISE Campaign (Women into Science and Engineering) is a United Kingdom-based organization that encourages women and girls to value and pursue science, technology, engineering and maths-related courses in school or college and to move on into related careers and progress. Its mission statement aims to facilitate understanding of these disciplines among women and girls and the opportunities which they present at a professional level. It is operated by UKRC trading as WISE (company number 07533934).

== Formation ==
The campaign began on 17 January 1984, headed by The Baroness Platt of Writtle, a qualified mechanical engineer, at which time women made up 7% of graduate engineers and 3% of professional engineers in the UK. It was a collaboration between the Engineering Council and the Equal Opportunities Commission, originally viewed as a one-year campaign "Women into Science and Engineering" WISE'84.

== Activities ==
One of WISE's main objectives is to listen to students and women qualified or working in these sectors, and understand and voice their opinions to academic institutions, policy-makers and employers. It then works creatively with delivery agencies and others, offering models, tools and approaches to support them in challenging traditional approaches, so as to demonstrate equitable involvement. WISE combats gender stereotypes to get more girls and women involved in careers where female participation was once considered near impossible.

In 1986, as part of her at WISE,Thames Polytechnic lecturer, Pamela Morton, conducted research that found that the number of women enrolling in Computer Science degrees had halved during the previous decade and was continuing to decline, despite the WISE Campaign. She approached the IT Skills Agency with a view to organising a campaign to increase the number of women entering the IT industry. These efforts contributed to the development of the PITCOM's 1989 Women in IT Campaign.

WISE operates throughout the UK, with specialist committees in Wales, Northern Ireland and Scotland. Volunteers, from industry and relevant organisations, attend the various WISE committee meetings, and undertake projects with WISE.

In 2011 the UKRC - an organisation specialising in gender equality in science, engineering and technology - became part of WISE. Trudy Norris-Grey, the Chair of UKRC since 2007 then became Chair of WISE. WISE counts The Princess Royal, Dame Julia Higgins, Kate Bellingham and Joanna Kennedy as its patrons. The Founding Chair and Patron The Baroness Platt of Writtle died on 1 February 2015, aged 91.

== Young Professionals' Board ==
The WISE Campaign has an advisory Board to the main Board called the WISE Young Professionals' Board, formerly the WISE Young Women's Board, with a mandate to act as a sounding board to the WISE Campaign and promote the visibility of young women in STEM.

Notable members and former members include:

- Jess Wade was a Young Professionals' Board member 2015-2018 and is a campaigner for Women in STEM and promoting early career researchers.

== Structure ==
It is headquartered at Leeds College of Building, though has been based at the UKRC (UK Resource Centre for Women in Science, Engineering, and Technology) in Bradford.
