= In Our Time (radio series) =

Live BBC radio discussion series

- Genre: Discussion
- Running time: Approx. 45 minutes
- Country of origin: United Kingdom
- Language: English
- Home station: BBC Radio 4
- Hosted by: Melvyn Bragg (1998–2025); Misha Glenny (2026–)
- Produced by: Simon Tillotson
- Original release: 15 October 1998 – present
- No. of episodes: 1089 (as of 6 July 2025)
- Website: www.bbc.co.uk/programmes/b006qykl
- Podcast: In Our Time Podcast

In Our Time is a BBC Radio 4 discussion series and podcast exploring a wide variety of historical, scientific and philosophical topics. First aired in October 1998, it is one of Radio 4's most successful discussion programmes, acknowledged to have "transformed the landscape for serious ideas at peak listening time". The series passed its 1,000th episode in September 2023 and attracts a weekly audience exceeding two million listeners.

The show was presented by Melvyn Bragg, from its first broadcast in 15 October 1998 to 3 July 2025. On 3 December 2025, the BBC announced that Misha Glenny would take over as the new presenter, and Glenny's first programme was aired 15 January 2026.

== Programme ==
The series, devised and produced by Olivia Seligman (with others) and currently produced by Simon Tillotson with Victoria Brignell, runs weekly throughout the year on BBC Radio 4, except for a summer break of approximately eight to ten weeks between July and September. Each programme covers a specific historical, philosophical, religious, cultural or scientific topic. In a November 2009 interview, Bragg described how he prepares for each show: "It's not easy, but I like reading. I enjoy what was called swotting in my day. I get the notes late Friday afternoon for the following Thursday morning. I find all the spare time I can for reading, get up very early on a Thursday morning, have a final two hours of nervousness, and away we go."

Bragg hosts discussion of the week's subject featuring what he has characterised as "three absolutely top-class academics" on the subject. The programme is normally broadcast live and unedited on Thursday mornings at 9 a.m., lasting around 42 minutes, and is then available online. He begins each episode with a short summary of the week's topic, then introduces the three guests. He guides the discussion along a generally chronological route, then either concludes the programme himself or invites summation remarks from one of the specialists.

Bragg gives short shrift to pretension of any kind, while remaining stalwart in his search for knowledge. His methodology in In Our Time is... not unlike that of a man throwing a stick for a dog: he chucks his questions ahead, and if the chosen academic fails to bring it right back, he chides them. He retains enough of his bluff Cumbrian origins not to be taken in by gambolling and tweedy high spirits.

— Will Self, from a February 2010 issue of the London Review of Books

== History ==
In Our Time was conceived for Bragg in 1998 after he was forced to quit his decade-long role as presenter for Start the Week due to a perceived conflict of interest arising from his appointment as a Labour life peer. He was offered the Thursday "death-slot" and decided he would "do what [he] always wanted to do," and "hastily battered out a simple idea" with producer Olivia Seligman expecting the show would only last a few months. By September 1999, he had taken a time slot that was previously attracting an audience of 600,000 and grown it to 1.5 million. By 2000, the half-hour show was expanded to 45 minutes and to include three guest speakers.

In 2004, the programme was made available as the first BBC podcast from the BBC website and iTunes for one week after broadcast. Until July 2014, listeners could also sign up for weekly email newsletters from Bragg, where he mentioned any additional information relating to the programme, along with snippets from his own personal and intellectual life. In 2009, selected transcripts of episodes from the programme were compiled in the book In Our Time: A Companion to the Radio 4 series, edited by Bragg. Since 2010, every episode of the programme has been available from its website as streaming audio, making it one of the first BBC programmes to have its entire archive released. Since 2011, the entire archive has been available to download as individual podcasts.

Bragg's last show, on the subject of Civility, was broadcast on 3 July 2025 and on 3 September he announced that he was stepping down as presenter. Misha Glenny's first programme was aired 15 January 2026.

== Cultural impact ==
The programme is considered one of the BBC's most successful projects, acknowledged to have "transformed the landscape for serious ideas at peak listening time". Frequent contributors to the programme since 1998 include Angie Hobbs, Simon Schaffer, Martin Palmer, Steve Jones, Paul Cartledge, Carolin Crawford, Edith Hall, A. C. Grayling, Patricia Fara, David Wootton, Jonathan Bate, and Karen O'Brien.

In 2005, listeners were invited to vote in a popularity contest for the "greatest philosopher in history" with the winner selected as the subject of the final programme before the summer break. With 30,000 votes cast, the contest was won by Karl Marx with 27.9% of the votes. Other shortlisted figures were David Hume (12.7%), Ludwig Wittgenstein (6.8%), Friedrich Nietzsche (6.5%), Plato (5.6%), Immanuel Kant (5.6%), Thomas Aquinas (4.8%), Socrates (4.8%), Aristotle (4.5%) and Karl Popper (4.2%). The poll was controversial but led to widespread reporting, and a boost in the programme's overall listenership, as various UK celebrities and news outlets championed their favourites.
