= Ben UFO =

English DJ

Ben UFO, also known as Ben Thomson, is a DJ from London and co-founder of Hessle Audio. He started out on pirate radio station Sub FM and has had a radio show on Rinse and often DJs alongside co-founders David Kennedy (Pearson Sound) and Pangaea. He has curated mixes for BBC radio, Fabric, and Rinse FM and DJed at clubs and festival across the world. His BBC radio Essential Mix was shortlisted for mix of the year 2021.
