= Hessle Audio =

London-based electronic music record label

Hessle Audio is a London-based electronic music record label. The founders of the record label are DJs and producers Ben UFO, Pangaea, and Pearson Sound. The records released by Hessle Audio have spanned house, techno, UK garage, dubstep and electronica with releases by artists such as Pearson Sound, Objekt (musician), James Blake (musician), Blawan, Martyn (musician), Peverelist and Olof Dreijer of The Knife.
