= Rhian Touyz =

South African medical researcher

Rhian Touyz Koppel Schiffrin FRCP FRSE
- Born: Rhian Merry; 27 January 1959 (age 67); Johannesburg, South Africa
- Education: University of the Witwatersrand
- Awards: Joan Mott Prize Lecture, Award of Research Excellence, AHA Council on Hypertension
- Scientific career
- Fields: Cardiovascular medicine
- Workplaces: Research Institute of the McGill University Health Centre
- Website: https://rimuhc.ca

Rhian Merry Touyz Koppel Schiffrin (born January 27, 1959) is a Canadian medical researcher and clinician scientist. She is currently serving as the executive director and Chief Scientific Officer of the Research Institute of the McGill University Health Centre in Montreal, Canada, since 2021. A clinician scientist, her research primarily focuses on hypertension and cardiovascular disease.

== Early life and education ==
Touyz earned her BSc (1980), MBBCh (1984), MSc (1986) and PhD (1992) from the University of the Witwatersrand, Johannesburg, South Africa. She completed a post-doctoral fellowship (1992–1996) at the Institut de recherches cliniques de Montréal (IRCM).

== Career ==
Touyz was a Staff Scientist and an Assistant Professor at the IRCM, in Montreal, Canada until 2005.

From 2005 to 2011, Touyz joined the Kidney Research Centre of the Ottawa Hospital Research Institute, University of Ottawa, where she held a Tier 1 Canada Research Chair in Hypertension.

In 2011, Touyz moved to the University of Glasgow where she served as Director of the Institute of Cardiovascular and Medical Sciences (ICAMS), British Heart Foundation (BHF) Chair and Professor of Cardiovascular Medicine, University of Glasgow. A clinician scientist, she was also Director of the BHF Centre of Research Excellence in Vascular Science and Medicine and a consultant in the Queen Elizabeth University Hospital.

In 2021, Touyz was appointed as the executive director and Chief Scientific Officer of the Research Institute of the McGill University Health Centre in Montreal, Canada. Concurrently, she became an assistant professor in the departments of Medicine and Family Medicine, Faculty of Medicine and Health Sciences and the Dr. Phil Gold Chair in Medicine at McGill University.

Touyz' research focuses on molecular and vascular biology of hypertension and target organ damage, particularly: 1) vascular signaling and redox biology; 2) adipose biology and cardiometabolic disease; 3) cardiovascular toxicity of anti-cancer drugs, 4) pathophysiology and management of human hypertension.

Touyz has held important roles in many organizations including the European Society of Cardiology (committee member, Guidelines), the Canadian Hypertension Society (President), the AHA High Blood Pressure Research Council (chair), the International Society of Hypertension (President) and the European Council for Cardiovascular Research (President).

Touyz serves as the editor-in-chief of Hypertension. She is an Associate Editor of Pharmacological Reviews

== Awards and honours ==
- 2005 Dahl Lecture Award by the American Heart Association
- 2006 Grace A Goldsmith Award, American Society of Nutrition
- 2009 Vincenzo Panagia Distinguished Lecture Award, Institute of Cardiovascular Sciences Award
- 2010 Distinguished Service award from Hypertension Canada
- 2012 Robert M. Berne Distinguished Lecturer of the American Physiological Society.
- 2013 Elected a Fellow of the Royal Society of Edinburgh
- 2014 RD Wright Lecture Award of the High Blood Pressure Research Council of Australia
- 2015 Harriet Dustan Award for research excellence, Council on Hypertension, American Heart Association.
- 2016 American Society of Hypertension's 2016 Irvine Page Award for outstanding work in the field of hypertension
- 2017 Joan Mott Prize Lecture from The Physiological Society
- 2017 Elected a Fellow of the Academy of Medical Sciences
- 2019 Award of Research Excellence by the American Heart Association (AHA) Council on Hypertension.
- 2022 Kenneth D. Bloch Award, American Heart Association
