= Joanna Kennedy =

British civil engineer and project manager

Joanna Kennedy OBE FREng
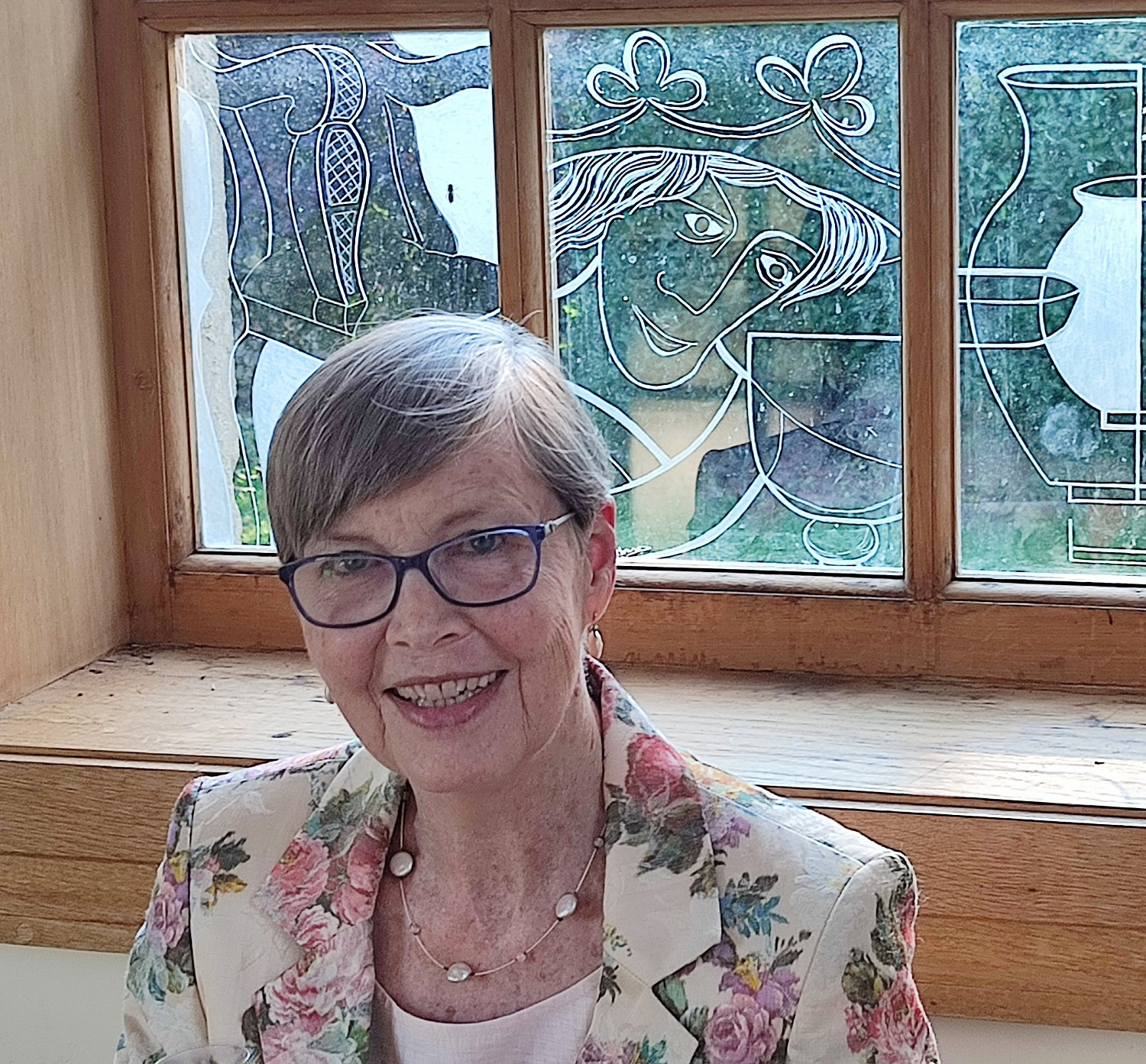
- Kennedy in 2021
- Born: Joanna Alicia Gore Ormsby; 22 July 1950 (age 76); London
- Education: Lady Margaret Hall, Oxford
- Occupations: Civil engineer and project manager
- Organization: Arup
- Spouse: Richard Kennedy (m.1979)
- Children: 2s inc David Kennedy
- Awards: HonDSc (Salford 1997); Woman of the Year (Atkins Inspire Awards 2007); First Woman of Engineering (CBI/Real Business Awards 2013); Hon. Fellow (RCA 2017)

Joanna Kennedy (born 22 July 1950) is a British civil engineer and project manager who was Global Leader for Programme and Project Management at Arup until 2013 (a director from 1996). She is a patron of Women into Science and Engineering (WISE), which she helped launch in 1984. From 2015 until 2023 she was a Trustee of the National Portrait Gallery, latterly as deputy chair of the Trustee Board, and she chaired the project board for the Inspiring People redevelopment which was completed on time for the gallery's reopening, after three years closure, in June 2023. In 2024 the project was short-listed for the RIBA Stirling Prize.

== Early life, education and family ==
Born Joanna Alicia Gore Ormsby, in London, Kennedy was educated at The Abbey School, Reading and Queen Anne's School, Caversham and won a scholarship to Lady Margaret Hall, University of Oxford; she was one of just three females among over a hundred engineering students and graduated with first class honours in Engineering Science and the ICE Prize. She is the mother of two sons, one of them is the musician Pearson Sound.

== Career ==
Kennedy joined Ove Arup & Partners, consulting engineers, in 1972 and her projects as a design engineer included the M25 Runnymede Bridge and St Paul's Thameslink station. She was a founder of the firm's project management practice in 1990, became its leader for Europe in 2006 and was appointed Global Leader for Programme and Project Management in 2010. The practice was named the APM Project Management Company of the Year in both 2007 and 2012. She was a Trustee of the Ove Arup Foundation from 2010 to 2020.

She was project director for redevelopments at the Southbank Centre designed by Richard Rogers, the National Maritime Museum Cornwall, Hackney Empire, the Horniman Museum and she led the design team for the remodelled King's Cross St Pancras tube station.

She was Arup's project management director from 2008 to 2013 for the Francis Crick Institute and from 2009 to 2013 project director for the planned Defence and National Rehabilitation Centre.

She was a non-executive director of the property company Native Land from 2015 to 2023 and a director of the ERA Foundation from 2014 to 2024.

Kennedy's other appointments have included Vice-Chairman of the Port of London Authority, a Commissioner of the Royal Commission for the Exhibition of 1851, a Trustee of the Science Museum and a member of the Engineering Council. She was a Trustee of Cumberland Lodge from 2001 to 2011 and 2013 to 2018 and a Trustee of Poole Museum Foundation from 2021 to 2025.

She was appointed to the Council of the University of Southampton from 1996 until 1999, and to the Royal College of Art from 2001 until 2016 (also chairing the Buildings & Estates Committee). She was commissioned as a Major in the Engineer and Logistic Staff Corps in 2004 and was elected to the Smeatonian Society of Civil Engineers in 2005.

== Honours and awards ==
- 1994: Honorary Doctor of Science at the University of Salford
- 1995: Appointed an Officer of the Order of the British Empire in the Queen's Birthday Honours
- 1997: Elected a Fellow of the Royal Academy of Engineering
- 2007: Woman of the Year at the Atkins Inspire Awards for the built environment
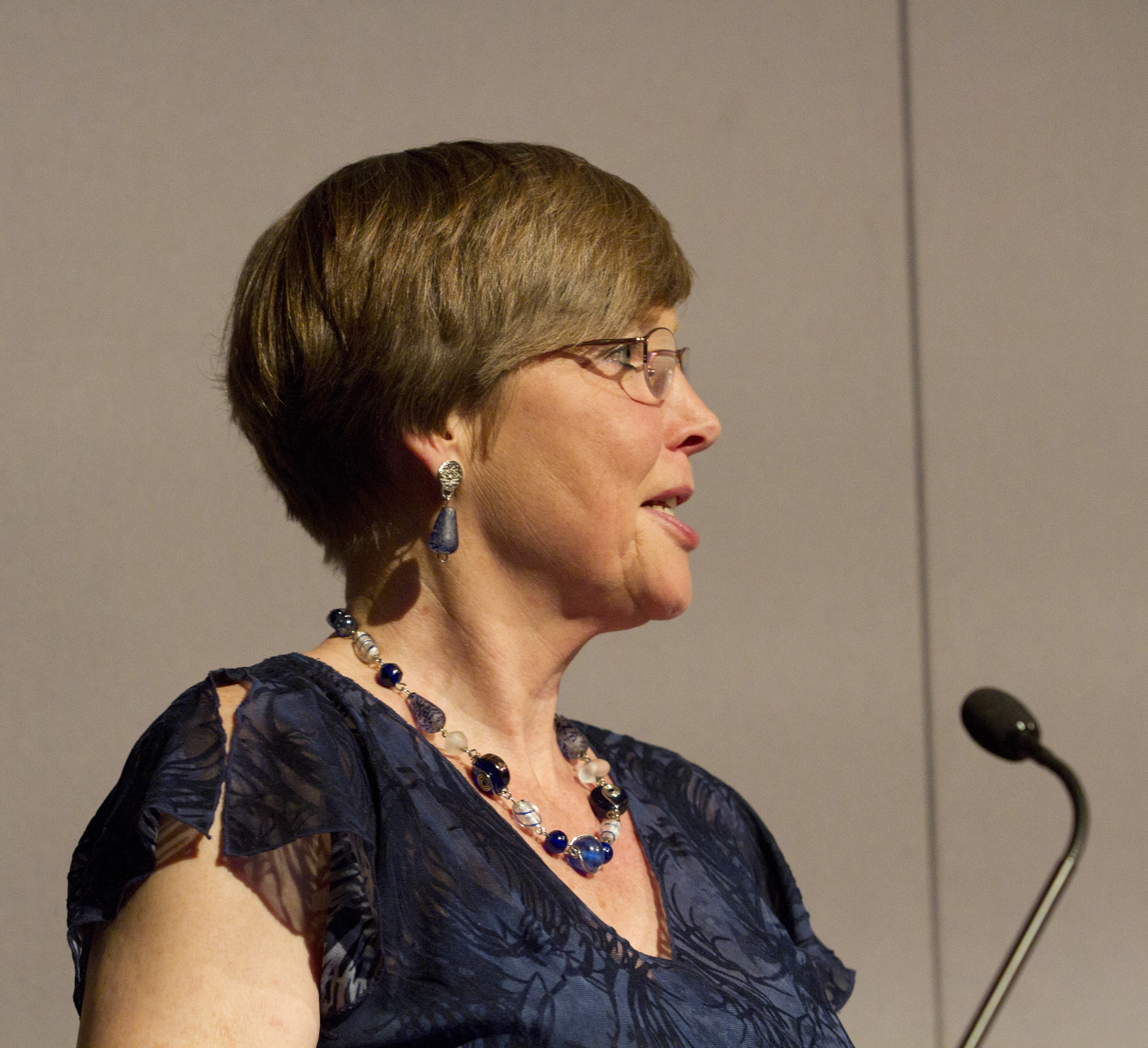
- Dr. Joanna Kennedy
  2008: Woman of Outstanding Achievement – For Leadership and Inspiration to Others.
- 2013: First Woman of Engineering at the CBI/Real Business Awards.
- 2017: Honorary Fellow of the Royal College of Art
