= Janice Marshall =

British physiologist

Janice M. Marshall was a British physiologist, best known for her work on blood vessels and their autonomic regulation. She was the Bowman Professor of Physiology at the University of Birmingham, with a particular interest in the cardiovascular system

== Biography ==
Roles within the University of Birmingham have included including Head of the Division of Medical Sciences, and she was the first Director of Education for the College of Medical & Dental Sciences (now the College of Medicine and Health).

Marshall was elected as a fellow of the Academy of Medical Sciences in 1999.

In 2024 she chaired the International Society for Autonomic Neuroscience congress in Birmingham.

She died on 21 February 2025 following a cardiac arrest.

== Work ==
Marshall led a group that significantly added to our understanding of the skeletal muscle blood flow response to exercise, mechanisms contributing to vasospasm in Primary Raynaud’s and Sickle Cell Disease, and the sex and ethnicity differences in cardiovascular control which may contribute to differential risk of cardiovascular disease and potential benefit of dietary and exercise interventions.

Marshall's most influential work relates to:

- the autonomic regulation of blood flow to muscle and the gut.
- hypoxia-induced vasodilation, and the concept of functional sympatholysis, where the release of local vasodilators blocks the vasoconstrictive response of sympathetic nerves.
- the pathophysiology of Raynaud's disease

Her most recent work focusses on cardiovascular regulation during exercise, hypoxia, mental stress, ethnicity and early markers of cardiovascular disease.
