= Pangaea (musician) =

English dubstep musician

Kevin McAuley, better known by his stage name Pangaea, is an English dubstep musician.

== History ==
McAuley's first release as Pangaea was in 2010, a self-titled EP. In 2012, McAuley released a double EP under the Pangaea moniker titled Release. The EP received positive reviews. McAuley released a DJ mix album as Pangaea in 2014, titled FabricLive.73. Mculey's debut album as Pangaea, In Drum Play, was released in 2016. In June 2023, McAuley announced his second full-length album as Pangaea, titled Changing Channels. The album was released on 6 October 2023 and received "Best New Music" designation from Pitchfork upon release.
