= Parliamentary Information Technology Committee =

The Parliamentary Information Technology Committee (PITCOM) was a United Kingdom Parliament Associate Parliamentary Group set up "to address the public policy issues generated by IT and its application across the UK economy, public and private".

It was formed in January 1981 by a merger of the All-Party IT Committee and the Parliamentary Computer Forum. Its constitution and term of reference changed over time to fit the changing rules for registered All Party Groups (e.g. that all officers be members of the House of Commons or the House of Lords, that groups be reconstituted after a General Election etc.). On 18 July 2011 it merged with the All-Party Group on the Digital Economy to form "The Parliamentary and ICT Forum" (PICTFOR).

== Objectives ==
The objectives stated in the first edition of the PITCOM Journal (published 1982 - 1999) were:

1 To promote among Members of Parliament and their advisers, and informed awareness of the potential and the limitations of the microelectronics, computing, communications and information handling technologies; their industrial, economic and social impact : and the actions necessary to maximise the industrial, economic and social advantages which these technologies make possible.

2) To analyse in consultation with industry, current and future problems in the field of information and computer technologies and to consult with suppliers, users and responsible organisations concerned and to arrange meetings, presentations, seminars and visits so as to promote continuity of analysis and policy in this field.

3) To provide a meeting place for informal, off-the-record exchanges of information, ideas and opinions on subjects of mutual concern between Members of Parliament, their advisers and members of the microelectronics, computing, communications and information handling industries.

== History ==
The founding chairman was Ian Lloyd MP, the vice-chairmen were Gwilym Roberts MP, Michael Marshall MP and Philip Virgo. The Treasurers were Gary Waller MP and David Mathieson. The Secretaries were Lord Lloyd of Kilgerran and Brian Murphy. The Membership Secretary was Richard Marriott.

Ian (later Sir Ian) Lloyd MP chaired PITCOM until 1987.

In that period PITCOM established a pattern of organising half a dozen evening meetings a year on current political topics plus an annual high-profile exhibition or event. The first of the latter, in 1981, was a week-long exhibition on computer-based aids for the disabled opened by Sir George Young MP, then Parliamentary Under-Secretary of State at the Department of Health and Social Services. The following year PITCOM organised a more ambitious event on computers in schools. Relays of children from over 30 schools demonstrated 26 systems in the Upper Waiting Room of the House of Commons, visited by over 120 MPs. Also in 1982, PITCOM organised a major seminar on "The Freedom of Broadcasting". This was addressed by, among others, the Home Secretary (Rt Hon W Whitelaw MP) and Mrs Mary Whitehouse. It also included the first public political discussions in the UK on the new Cable TV technologies that were expected to transform the world of broadcasting.

In 1984, over dinner after a PITCOM meeting on the effects of piracy on the nascent computer games industry, it was agreed that "something must be done" but that PITCOM should not compromise its neutral position by taking a lead. Those round the table decided to support the formation of a British Computer Society copyright committee to look at the issues. That committee met once and delegated a sub-group to report back on what should be done. That sub-group never reported back. Instead the participants formed the Federation Against Software Theft as a company limited by guarantee, and organised the campaign that led to the Copyright (Computer) Amendment Act in 1985. This is believed to have been the shortest time from start of a campaign to legislation on the statute book since the 1930s. Many PITCOM members helped expedite the process.

1n 1986 IBM loaned the main auditorium of its South Bank Centre to PITCOM for a daylong seminar on IT Skills Shortages, organised with the assistance of the National Computing Centre and the IT Skills Agency.

In 1987 Michael (later Sir Michael) Marshall MP, took over as chairman. He continued with the same formula of meetings and events for several years but also added overseas study tours. The first tour was to Texas in 1987. In 1989 PITCOM hosted the launch of the Women IT Campaign. This had seedcorn funding from DTI proportionate to the funding from industry. Over the period 1989 - 1994 the campaign team used £500,000 from DTI to leverage over £2 million from industry to organise careers events and advice and a kite-marking service for returner programmes, During that period the proportion of girls applying for IT-related degree course rose from barely 10% to over 25% and those employed on IT also rose significantly. Many PITCOM members were involved in the campaign and contributed to its success.

In 1994 PITCOM organised fringe meetings at the main party conferences and also organised the re-launch of EURIM (the European Informatics Group, now retitled "The Digital Policy Alliance") to organise policy studies and secure action where it found consensus. It was agreed that EURIM should be politically, financially and organisationally independent from PITCOM but companies would not be allowed to join EURIM unless they were also members of PITCOM. EURIM should also report quarterly to the PITCOM Council to for a discussion on priorities and co-operation. The reasons for the separation were partly to do with the rules for all-party party groups(e.g. the personal liability of officers who had to be MPs or Peers) and partly because EURIM was expected to work to secure action on its recommendations while PITCOM was expected to be strictly neutral, even where it found consensus. The requirement for EURIM members to join PITCOM was quickly dropped because of complaints by companies with no London-based staff. The reporting requirement was not dropped until in 2005.

In 1995 PITCOM had a very successful study tour of the United States (New Jersey, New York and Washington) to look at "The Politics of Multi-Media" during the run-up to the "reform" of the Federal Communications Commission to handle converged technologies and the digital age. In 1996 PITCOM visited Canada for the first time.

In 1997 John McWilliam MP (a Deputy Speaker) took over as chairman. He was also a Director of EURIM and decided which activities should be routed through EURIM and which through PITCOM. Thus the meetings to help organise the scrutiny of the legislation that created Ofcom were run through EURIM rather than PITCOM. During John's period of office PITCOM organised a study tour of Sweden, Finland and Germany, a second tour of Canada, a visit to Paris and tours of Japan and California. These were invaluable in helping put IT initiatives and arguments into international context.

In 2004 Christine Stewart Munro took over as Secretary of PITCOM from Frank Richardson, who had been involved in the creation of PITCOM and been secretary since 1984.

In 2005 Andrew Miller MP became chairman and in 2006 PITCOM celebrated its 25th anniversary. He instituted an annual competition for schools, organised by e-Skills, to not only interest the children but also their constituency MPs. In this period PITCOM opened up relations with the Internet Governance Forum, sponsoring MPs to attend its meetings and helping organise UK inputs and reports back.

The Rt Hon Alun Michael MP became chairman in 2011 by which time there was common agreement on the need to rationalise the growing number of all-party groups addressing IT related issues. Discussions were opened with other relevant groups and with EURIM (to formalise the de facto division of labour). The merger to form PICTFOR was the first tangible stage in that process.

Briefings for Parliamentarians issued by PITCOM were known as PITComms.
