= National Institute for Health and Care Research =

Health research institute in England

- Abbreviation: NIHR
- Established: April 2006
- Type: research institute
- Purpose: funding, enabling and delivering health and social care research
- Responsible officer: Lucy Chappell
- Parent organisation: Department of Health and Social Care
- Website: www.nihr.ac.uk
- Formerly called: National Institute for Health Research
- Applies to: England
Other UK counterparts
- Northern Ireland: Public Health Agency
- Scotland: NHS Research Scotland
- Wales: Health and Care Research Wales

The National Institute for Health and Care Research (NIHR) is a research institute funding clinical, public health, social care and translational research in England. With a budget of over £1.2 billion in 2020–21, its mission is to "improve the health and wealth of the nation through research". The NIHR was established in 2006 under the government's Best Research for Best Health strategy, and is funded by the UK Government's Department of Health and Social Care. As a research funder and research partner of the NHS, public health and social care, the NIHR complements the work of the Medical Research Council. NIHR focuses on translational research (translating discoveries from the laboratory to the clinic), clinical research and applied health and social care research.

== History ==
The National Institute for Health Research (as it was then called) was created in April 2006 under the government's health research strategy, Best Research for Best Health. This strategy outlined the direction that NIHR research and development should take. Its predecessor was the NHS Research & Development programme which was established in 1991. Factors influencing the creation of the NIHR were the growing importance of evidence-based medicine in science and policymaking, the spread of New Public Management thinking and increased government funding.

Its budget was over £1.2 billion in 2020–21. As of 2016 it was the largest national clinical research funder in Europe. In 2022 NIHR changed its name to National Institute for Health and Care Research in order to emphasise its role in social care research.

=== Notable discoveries and developments ===
- NIHR is among the world-leaders in COVID-19 research and recruited over a million people in their studies of the disease. In the RECOVERY trial, NIHR researchers found that the inexpensive steroid dexamethasone lowers the mortality rate among Covid patients receiving breathing support in hospitals. The PANORAMIC study, which examined the efficacy of molnupiravir and Paxlovid, was awarded the Prix Galien for its design and implementation.
- NIHR was one of the developers of the UK Standards for Public Involvement which set the framework on how to involve the public in research.
- Delivered a trial for Haemophilia A which resulted in the first successful use of gene therapy for treating the condition.
- Showed that using MRI is better for detecting prostate cancer than the more intrusive biopsy.
- Showed that gefapixant could be used to treat some types of cough, making it the first new cough medicine in 50 years.
- Demonstrated that a blood test can be used to better diagnose pre-eclampsia.

== Research ==
=== Areas of focus ===
In June 2021 NIHR published Best Research for Best Health: The Next Chapter. The document, building on the 2006 Best Research for Best Health strategy, outlined the updated operational principles, core work-streams and areas of strategic focus of the NIHR. Their work-streams include funding research for the NHS, public and global health and social care; investing in expertise and facilities; and involving patients and communities in research. Their current areas of strategic focus include learning from impact of COVID-19 on research and healthcare; researching for patients with multiple long-term conditions, involving under-served communities and regions in research; and improving equality, diversity and inclusion across the Institution.

=== Research programmes ===
The NIHR's funding programmes offer a focused source of funding for researchers within the health and care system in England. Scotland, Wales and Northern Ireland also participate in some of these programmes. The programmes give researchers access to funding to undertake clinical and applied health and social care research.

NIHR's funding programmes are:

- Efficacy and Mechanism Evaluation
- Evidence Synthesis
- Health and Social Care Delivery Research
- Health Technology Assessment
- Invention for Innovation
- National Research Collaboration Programme
- Policy Research Programme
- Programme Development Grants
- Programme Grants for Applied Research
- Public Health Research
- Research for Patient Benefit

=== Research schools ===
The NIHR has established three national research schools: the School for Primary Care Research, the School for Social Care Research, and the School for Public Health Research. Each national school is a research collaboration between academic centres in England. The three schools take part in developing evidence for use in practice and provide training and career development opportunities for researchers in their respective sectors.

=== Research units ===
NIHR funds a range of university-based collaborations that undertake research in priority areas: blood and organ donor health, health protection, and health and social care policy. Each unit focuses on a priority topic, for example blood donation, healthcare-associated infections, and adult social care.

=== Global health research ===
Supporting the UK International Development Strategy and the United Nations' Sustainable Development Goals, NIHR launched its Global Health portfolio in 2016. It funds applied health research that directly addresses the diverse health needs of people in low- and middle-income countries (LMICs) using UK Aid from the UK government. As well as funding Global Health Research Units and Groups, partnerships between British universities and LMIC institutions, NIHR invests in training and development in global health research and strengthening the research capacity of LMICs at individual, institutional and system level. Engaging and involving local communities in the design and delivery of health research is also part of the programme.

In accordance with NIHR's open access policy, research created with such funding needs to be published in an open access journal. NIHR's global health spendings can be checked through the database of the International Aid Transparency Initiative.

Since 2020, NIHR's global health research units and groups have been involved in efforts to tackle the spread and impact of the COVID-19 pandemic in LMICs.

=== Public partnerships ===
The NIHR offers several ways for patients and the public to participate in health and care research. People can take part in a study as a research participant, for example in a clinical trial that looks for new treatments for a health condition. People who are not affected by a particular condition or who care for someone with a long-term health issue can also take part in research. The NIHR runs the online services Be Part of Research and Join Dementia Research to inform the public about what health and care research is and to help them find studies that are looking for participants.

Patients and the public can also contribute to research through patient and public involvement (PPI). PPI is a partnership between members of the public (including patients, service users, carers) and researchers where public representatives can influence what should be a priority for research and help shape how the research is carried out, applied and communicated. Members of the public can find involvement opportunities in NIHR's research through the database People in Research. The website Learning for Involvement also offers information and resources for learning about public involvement and best practice case studies. The NIHR's global health research funding application process also requires applicants to meaningfully involve affected communities in their research, a practice known in the global health context as Community Engagement and Involvement (CEI).

== Infrastructure ==
NIHR funds research infrastructure that provides expertise, specialist facilities, a delivery workforce and support services. This infrastructure supports and delivers research funded by government bodies, medical research charities, the life sciences industry and other relevant industries.

NIHR coordinates and supports clinical research through its Research Delivery Network (RDN). With 12 regional networks across England, the RDN provides help to patients, the public and health and care organisations to participate in research. In 2021–22, the network recruited more than a million participants to clinical research studies, most of whom were taking part in research to help discover new treatments and vaccines for the COVID-19 pandemic.

Since 2007, the NIHR also supports translating scientific developments into direct clinical treatments and applications through its twenty Biomedical Research Centres (BRCs). The BRCs operate as partnerships between local NHS organisations and academic institutions such as the University of Oxford or University College London. Around 2022, the NIHR established Clinical Research Facilities – dedicated spaces for delivering research and trials – at 28 NHS hospitals.

The NIHR also funds three Patient Safety Translational Research Centres which focus on translating discoveries on patient safety into practice.

Researching specific regional health and care issues, the NIHR has a network of 15 Applied Research Collaborations. These are partnerships between universities, NHS healthcare providers, local authorities and other organisations. Based at NHS organisations, the NIHR Medtech and In vitro diagnostic Co-operatives work with commercial companies on developing new medical technologies and research in vitro diagnostic tests.

Established by its Office for Clinical Research Infrastructure in 2011, the NIHR has eight Translational Research Collaborations – ready-formed networks of universities, NHS trusts and research centres that conduct early-phase translational research and tackle experimental medicine challenges in selected therapeutic themes.

== Career development and support ==
The NIHR Academy, launched in 2018, develops and coordinates the NIHR's academic training, career and research capacity development. Its launch was an output and recommendation of the strategic review of training which looked at the future training and support needs of researchers.

The NIHR Academy provides training and career development awards from pre-doctoral level to research professorships. As of 2021 the Dean of the NIHR Academy is Professor Waljit Dhillo, Professor in Endocrinology and Metabolism, and Consultant Endocrinologist. He also holds the position of Head of the Division of Diabetes, Endocrinology & Metabolism at Imperial College London.

The award of NIHR Senior Investigator is given to recognise "the most prominent and prestigious researchers funded by the NIHR and the most outstanding leaders of patient and people-based research within the NIHR research community", and held for four years with the possibility of a second term and then alumnus status. The NIHR's flagship award is the Research Professorship which funds the clinical and applied health research of outstanding academics for 5-years. Similarly, the Global Health Research Professorship funds research that benefits low and middle income countries.

== Key people and structure ==
Responsibility for the NIHR lies with the Chief Scientific Advisor to the Department of Health and Social Care (DHSC). Professor Sally Davies (Dame Sally from 2009) held this post from 2004 to 2016, and led the founding of the NIHR in 2006. She was succeeded by Professor Chris Whitty (who has also been Chief Medical Officer for England since 2019).

Since August 2021, the current holder of the post is Lucy Chappell, Professor of Obstetrics at King's College London.

For operating the NIHR, the DHSC contracts with a number of NHS Trusts, universities and life science organisations that host NIHR's two coordinating centres:

- NIHR Coordinating Centre (NIHRCC), hosted by Leeds Teaching Hospitals NHS Trust, the University of Southampton, and LGC.
- NIHR Research Delivery Network Coordinating Centre (RDNCC), hosted together by the University of Leeds.

The Dean of the NIHR Academy and the Research Programme Directors are also contracted by the DHSC.

== Publications ==
The NIHR publishes five peer-reviewed, open access journals which make up the NIHR Journals Library. The journals are titled Efficacy and Mechanism Evaluation, Health and Social Care Delivery Research, Health Technology Assessment, Public Health Research, and Programme Grants for Applied Research. Researchers working in relevant, NIHR-funded projects are required to publish in an NIHR journal. Besides publishing the final research articles, the NIHR Journals Library supports the model of open science by providing a transparent, 'living' document for each research project which is updated alongside the progress of the study. This involves publishing all relevant materials from the outset of the studies, including the relevant systematic reviews, research protocol, study documentation, plain English descriptions, and data.

The NIHR publishes short, easy-to-read summaries and thematic overviews of the most important research findings on the NIHR Evidence website. Some of the summaries are also published in The British Medical Journal.

The NIHR also has an open science platform where researchers can share any kind of relevant articles, documents and data including negative or null results.

=== Open access ===
NIHR has an open access policy and was one of the original funders of Europe PubMed Central. Their updated policy requires all NIHR-funded, peer-reviewed research articles submitted after June 2022 have to be immediately, freely and openly accessible to all. The articles are required to use the Creative Commons attribution (CC BY) or the Open Government Licence (OGL).

== Achievements and recognition ==
- In 2016, NIHR commissioned the independent RAND Europe think tank and the Policy Institute at King's College London to collate and synthesise 100 examples of positive change arising from NIHR's support of health and care research in its first 10 years. The assessment found that the NIHR had "transformed research & development in and for the NHS and the patients it serves".
- In 2017, the NIHR was awarded one of the first 'Cochrane-REWARD prizes for reducing waste in research' for the Adding Value in Research Programme
- In 2018, an article published in Public Health identified that NHS trusts with increased NIHR-adopted clinical trial activity are associated with reduced mortality levels.
- In 2022, a study looking at clinical trial transparency among European medical research funders ranked NIHR the highest for being the most compliant in implementing best practices.
- In September 2022, NIHR Cambridge BRC announced what is believed to be UK's first demonstration of genomic data federation by connecting the trusted research environments of NIHR Cambridge BRC with Genomics England as part of a UK Research & Innovation-funded project involving University of Cambridge, NIHR Cambridge BRC, Genomics England, Lifebit, Eastern Academic Health Science Network, and Cambridge University Health Partners.

== See also ==
- Medical Research Council
- National Institute for Health and Care Excellence
- Health Research Authority
- Medicines and Healthcare products Regulatory Agency
- Health and Care Research Wales
- NHS Research Scotland
