= UKRC =

The UKRC (UK Resource Centre) is a UK organisation for the provision of advice, services and policy consultation regarding the under-representation of women in science, engineering, technology and the built environment (SET). It is funded by the Department for Business, Innovation and Skills and was launched in 2004.

The central base is located in Bradford in the North of England but there are also centres in South East England, South Yorkshire, Scotland and Wales.

The UKRC works to promote gender equality in SET with employers and professional bodies; education institutions; women's organisations and networks; policy institutes; sector skills councils; the government and many others. This includes implementing the Athena SWAN Charter.

In 2011 it took over the leadership of the WISE Campaign and became UKRC-WISE. In late 2012 it took on the WISE name.

== See also ==
- Women of Outstanding Achievement Photographic Exhibition
