= Binnie =

Binnie is both a surname and a given name. Notable people with the name include:

== Surname ==
- Alex Binnie (footballer), Scottish footballer of the 1920s
- Alex Binnie (tattoo artist) (born 1959), English tattooist and printmaker
- Alexander Binnie (1839–1917), civil engineer who worked on crossings of the River Thames in London
- Brian Binnie (1953–2022), test pilot for the experimental spaceplane SpaceShipOne
- Brian Binnie (born 1968), Scottish curler
- Christopher Binnie, Jamaican squash player
- Edward Binnie (1884–1956), Antarctic administrator
- Geoffrey Binnie (1908–1989), British civil engineer
- Ian Binnie (born 1939), puisne justice on the Supreme Court of Canada
- Imogen Binnie (born 1978/1979), American novelist and screenwriter
- William Binnie (minister) (1823–1886) Scottish Presbyterian minister who wrote on the Psalms
- William Binnie (architect) (c. 1885/1886–?), Scottish architect
- William Binnie (engineer) (1867–1949), British civil engineer
- William Harrison Binnie (born 1958), American industrialist

== Given name or nickname ==
- Binnie Barnes (1903–1998), English actress
- Binnie Hale (1899–1984), English actress and musician
- Binnie Kirshenbaum (born 1964), American writer of novels and short stories
- Binnie (born 1997), South Korean member of the girl group Oh My Girl

== Fictional characters ==
- Binnie Roberts, in the BBC soap opera EastEnders

== See also ==
- Binny, a surname
- Binay, a surname
