= Smeatonian Society of Civil Engineers =

Dining and discussion club for civil engineers

- Predecessor: The Society of Civil Engineers
- Established: 1771
- Founder: John Smeaton, Robert Mylne and five others
- Type: Civil engineering professional association
- Headquarters: London
- Members: approx 85
- Key people: Professor Peter Guthrie, President; Professor David Johnson, Honorary Treasurer
- Website: www.smeatonians.org

The Smeatonian Society of Civil Engineers was founded in England in 1771. It was the first engineering society to be formed anywhere in the world, and remains the oldest. It was originally known as the Society of Civil Engineers, being renamed following its founder's death.

== History ==
The first known formal meeting of civil engineers in Britain took place at the King's Head tavern in Holborn, London, on 15 March 1771, when seven of the leading engineers of the time agreed to establish a Society of Civil Engineers. The leading light of the new Society was John Smeaton who was the first engineer to describe himself as a "Civil Engineer", having coined the term to distinguish himself from the military engineers graduating from the Royal Military Academy at Woolwich. The other founding members were Thomas Yeoman, Robert Mylne, Joseph Nickalls, John Grundy, John Thompson and James King. In the first year they were joined by John Golborne, William Black, Robert Whitworth and Hugh Henshall, and these eleven were known as the Original Members.

When the Society was founded its title was the "Society of Civil Engineers". When William Mylne started a new Minute Book in 1822 he used the heading "Engineers' Society" in the reports of each session until 1869, when he changed it to "Smeatonian Society". The Rules and Regulations issued in 1830 bore the title "Smeatonian Society of Civil Engineers" for the first time, which has been its title ever since. Major Henry Watson was the first military engineer to be elected to membership in 1774.

Eventually the Smeatonian Society of Civil Engineers became more of a dining club and a group of younger engineers began to demand a better grouping to aid their profession and the Institution of Civil Engineers was formed in 1818.

The unveiling of a memorial stone to Smeaton in Westminster Abbey on 7 November 1994, by Noel Ordman, President, was described in The Times as 'a triumph for the Smeatonian Society'. Smeaton is also one of six civil engineers depicted in the Stephenson stained glass window, designed by William Wailes and unveiled in 1862.

== Present day ==
The Society continues to this day, mainly as a dining and discussion club of around sixty senior professional engineers, 'distinguished for their work in the theory or practice of design, manufacture, construction or management in the various fields of engineering', up to eighteen retired Members Emeritus and up to fifteen Honorary Members. The late Prince Philip, Duke of Edinburgh (elected 1953) served as president in 1971 and was an active participant until 2017. Anne, Princess Royal (elected 2017) accepted the invitation to be 2021 president, fifty years after her father, and on 8 September 2021 presided at the Society's two hundred and fiftieth anniversary dinner at Trinity House, Tower Hill. Since 1975 the Society has often met at the headquarters of the Institution of Civil Engineers.

== Mottos ==
The Latin motto "Omnia in Numero, Pondere et Mensura" was added to the summons card in 1793; it is adapted from Wisdom of Solomon 11:20 "(Thou hast ordered) all things by number, weight and measure". The proposal of the Reverend William Whewell (Honorary Member 1836) at a meeting on 14 June 1843 was accepted, that a Greek motto (probably from Aristotle) should be added to the summons card: "Τεχνη κρατουμεν ὢν φυσει νικωμεθα" "By Art we master what would master us". Both mottos are still in use.

== Historical membership classes ==
From 1793 the renewed Society was to be "for promoting and communicating every branch of knowledge useful and necessary to the various and important branches of public and private works in civil engineering". There were three classes of membership: First Class - "those who are actually employed in Designing, & forming, Works of different kinds, in the Various Departments of Engineering".
Second Class - "Men of Science and Gentlemen of Fame and Fortune" (Honorary Members).
Third Class - "Various Artists, whose professions and employments, are necessary & useful thereto as well as connected with Civil Engineering" (Honorary Members).

Women elected include Jean Venables (2003, the 2025 President), Joanna Kennedy (2006), Julia Elton FSA (Honorary 2010), Dame Julia Higgins (2012), Bridget Rosewell (Honorary 2016), Dame Ann Dowling (2017), Dame Helen Atkinson (2017), Dame Judith Hackitt (2018), Faith Wainwright (2019), Sue Kershaw (2021), Michèle Dix (2022), Elaine Martin (2022), Julie Bregulla (2022) and Dame Dervilla Mitchell (2022).

== Presidents ==
The following is a list of presidents of the Society from its inception. Honorary Members are shown in italics. In 1793 the Society was reconstituted without a president. The post was reintroduced as an annually elected position in 1841:

- 1771 Thomas Yeoman
- 1781 Christopher Pinchbeck
- 1783 Joseph Nickalls
- 1841 Sir John Rennie
- 1842 William Chadwell Mylne
- 1843 Bryan Donkin
- 1844 George Rennie
- 1845 William Cubitt
- 1846 Dr Peter Mark Roget, MD
- 1847 Robert Stephenson
- 1848 Joshua Field
- 1849 John Taylor
- 1850 James Simpson
- 1851 Thomas Lloyd
- 1852 James Walker
- 1853 Charles Blacker Vignoles
- 1854 Joseph Baxendale
- 1855 Sir John Rennie(2nd term)
- 1856 Robert Stephenson (2nd term)
- 1857 John Hawkshaw
- 1858 Henry Wollaston Blake
- 1859 William Chadwell Mylne (2nd term)
- 1860 John Murray
- 1861 William Gravatt
- 1862 Charles Hutton Gregory
- 1863 Captain John Lintorn Arabin Simmons, RE
- 1864 William Lindley
- 1865 Peter William Barlow
- 1866 Charles Blacker Vignoles (2nd term)
- 1867 Alfred Giles
- 1868 John Fowler
- 1869 John Penn
- 1870 Col. William Francis Drummond Jervois, RE
- 1871 John Frederic La Trobe Bateman
- 1872 Bryan Donkin
- 1873 George Banks Rennie
- 1874 Dr John Percy, MD
- 1875 William Henry Barlow
- 1876 Sir Joseph William Bazalgette
- 1877 James Abernethy
- 1878 James Brunlees
- 1879 Charles William Siemens
- 1880 No president elected
- 1881 Warington Wilkinson Smyth
- 1882 George Barclay Bruce
- 1883 Sir Frederick Joseph Bramwell
- 1884 Edward Woods
- 1885 Thomas Hawksley
- 1886 Sir Frederick Augustus Abel
- 1887 Robert Joseph Rawlinson
- 1888 Col. Sir William Crossman, RE
- 1889 John Clarke Hawkshaw
- 1890 Richard Boxall Grantham
- 1891 Field Marshal Sir John Lintorn Arabin Simmons, RE (2nd term)
- 1892 John Wolfe Barry
- 1893 Samuel Pope, QC
- 1894 Benjamin Baker
- 1895 Henry Marc Brunel
- 1896 Captain Douglas Galton, RE
- 1897 Frank McClean
- 1898 William Henry Preece
- 1899 Captain Sir Andrew Noble, RA
- 1900 Sir William Henry White
- 1901 Francis Willam Webb
- 1902 James Dewar
- 1903 Percy George Buchanan Westmacott
- 1904 Sir Alexander Richardson Binnie
- 1905 George Chatterton
- 1906 Alexander Siemens
- 1907 George Neill Abernethy
- 1908 Alexander Blackie William Kennedy
- 1909 George Frederick Deacon
- 1910 Cuthbert Andrew Brereton
- 1911 Charles Hawksley
- 1912 George Robert Jebb
- 1913 William Cawthorne Unwin
- 1914 Sir Philip Watts
- 1915-18 No president
- 1919 John Hutton Balfour Browne, KC
- 1920 Saxton William Armstrong Noble
- 1921 John Strain
- 1922 John Harvard Biles
- 1923 Sir Robert Elliott-Cooper
- 1924 Maurice Fitzmaurice
- 1925 Alan Archibald Campbell Swinton
- 1926 Henry Reginald Arnulph Mallock
- 1927 John Assheton Rennie
- 1928 William Barton Worthington
- 1929 Engineer Vice Admiral Henry John Oram
- 1930 John Henry Tudsbery Tudsbery
- 1931 Sir John Audley Frederick Aspinall
- 1932 Sir Archibald Denny, Bart
- 1933 Kenneth Alfred Wolfe Barry
- 1934 Sir Charles Langbridge Morgan
- 1935 William Vaux Graham
- 1936 Ernest Frederic Crosbie Trench
- 1937 Charles Pratt Sparks
- 1938 John McFarlane Kennedy
- 1939 Thomas Garmondsway Wrightson
- 1940 No president
- 1941 Sir Westcott Stile Abell
- 1942 Sir Eustace Henry Tennyson-d'Eyncourt, Bart
- 1943 Maurice Fitzgerald Wilson
- 1944 Sir John Edward Thornycroft
- 1945 Sir Richard Augustine Studdart Redmayne
- 1946 William James Eames Binnie
- 1947 Sir Alexander Gibb
- 1948 Sir Leopold Halliday Savile
- 1949 Sydney Bryan Donkin
- 1950 Sir Cyril Reginald Sutton Kirkpatrick
- 1951 Engineer Vice Admiral Sir Reginald William Skelton
- 1952 Sir Murdoch MacDonald, MP
- 1953 Sir David Anderson
- 1954 Sir William Thomson Halcrow
- 1955 Lieutenant Colonel Sir Jonathan Robertson Davidson
- 1956 Marmaduke Tudsbery Tudsbery (Member Emeritus)
- 1957 Vernon Alec Murray Robertson
- 1958 Thomas Edwin Hawksley
- 1959 Sir Allan Stephen Quartermaine
- 1960 Major William Henry Morgan
- 1961 Brigadier Sir Bruce Gordon White
- 1962 William Kelly Wallace
- 1963 Reginald Duncan Gwyther
- 1964 John Garmondsway Wrightson
- 1965 John Sunderland Langdale Train
- 1966 Sir George Matthew McNaughton
- 1967 Vice Admiral (E) Sir Denys Chester Ford
- 1968 David Mowat Watson
- 1969 Sir William Henry Glanville
- 1970 Geoffrey Morse Binnie (Member Emeritus)
- 1971 Prince Philip, Duke of Edinburgh
- 1972 Reginald William Mountain
- 1973 Sir Harold John Boyer Harding (Member Emeritus)
- 1974 John Elliott George Palmer (Member Emeritus)
- 1975 Reginald White Hawkey
- 1976 Sir Victor Shepheard (Member Emeritus)
- 1977 Vice Admiral Sir Frank Trowbridge Mason
- 1978 Sir Ralph Freeman (Member Emeritus)
- 1979 Cecil Robert Costeker Turner
- 1980 Sir Thomas Angus Lyall Paton (Member Emeritus)
- 1981 Alec Westley Skempton (Member Emeritus)
- 1982 Douglas Cecil Coode (Member Emeritus)
- 1983 Sir Eric Grant Yarrow, Bart
- 1984 Sir William Gordon Harris
- 1985 Alfred Henry Cantrell
- 1986 John Walter Baxter
- 1987 Rear Admiral John Garth Watson
- 1988 Sir William Kirby Laing
- 1989 Alan James Harris
- 1990 Edwin McAlpine, Baron McAlpine of Moffat (died 1990)
- 1990 Alan Mais, Baron Mais
- 1991 Arthur David Holland
- 1992 (Francis) David Penny
- 1993 John Vernon Bartlett
- 1994 N Noel B Ordman
- 1995 James G Wiltshire
- 1996 Surgeon Vice-Admiral Sir James Watt
- 1997 Henry Chilver, The Lord Chilver of Cranfield
- 1998 Vice-Admiral Sir Philip Watson
- 1999 Peter Arthur Cox
- 2000 Sir Hugh Ford
- 2001 James Anthony Gaffney
- 2002 Major General Peter J M Pellereau
- 2003 Sir Diarmuid Downs
- 2004 Professor Jacques Heyman
- 2005 John C McKenzie
- 2006 Air Marshal Sir Charles Pringle
- 2007 Sir William McAlpine
- 2008 Sir Martin Laing
- 2009 David Gwilym Morris Roberts
- 2010 Sir John Parker
- 2011 Alastair J M Soane
- 2012 G Oliver Whitehead
- 2013 George Bartlett QC
- 2014 Alec Broers, Baron Broers
- 2015 John M Watson
- 2016 Robin L Wilson
- 2017 Sir Frederick W Crawford
- 2018 Robert Benaim
- 2019 Norman D Haste
- 2020 Douglas Oakervee
- 2021 The Princess Royal
- 2022 Sir John Armitt
- 2023 George Fleming
- 2024 Tony Roche
- 2025 Jean Venables
- 2026 Peter Guthrie
