= Binny =

Binny is a surname and given name which may refer to:

People:

- Binny (surname)
- Binny Bansal, Indian billionaire, software engineer and entrepreneur
- Binny Yanga (1958–2015), Indian social worker
- Archibald Binny (1762/3–1838), co-founder of Binny & Ronaldson, which established the first permanent type foundry in the United States

Fictional characters:

- Binny Baumann, title character of Binny and the Ghost, a German television series

Businesses:

- Binny's Beverage Depot, chain of liquor stores

== See also ==
- Mesopotamichthys sharpeyi or binni, a fish species
- Binny and Co., a defunct shipping, textile, banking and insurance firm which was based in Chennai, India
- Binnie, a given name and surname
- Binay, a surname
