= Alan Muir Wood =

British civil engineer (1921–2009)

Sir Alan Muir Wood FRS FREng FICE
- Born: 8 August 1921; Hampstead, London
- Died: 1 February 2009 (aged 87)
- Engineering career
- Discipline: Civil
- Institutions: Institution of Civil Engineers (president), British Tunnelling Society (Chairman), International Tunneling Association (honorary lifetime president)

Sir Alan Marshall Muir Wood (8 August 1921 – 1 February 2009) was a British civil engineer.

== Education ==
Muir Wood was born on 8 August 1921 at Hampstead in London. Educated at Abbotsholme School, he later studied mechanical sciences at Peterhouse, Cambridge, from 1940 and graduated with a Master of Arts degree.

== Career ==
Due to the Second World War Muir Wood joined the Royal Naval Volunteer Reserve (RNVR) as a commissioned officer on 5 October 1942. He reached the rank of Probationary Temporary Sub-Lieutenant (Engineers) in the RNVR before transferring as Temporary Sub-Lieutenant (Engineers) to the Royal Navy on 5 June 1944. Muir Wood was promoted to Temporary Lieutenant (Engineers) on 1 August 1945, with seniority of 5 April 1945.

After leaving the navy in 1946 Muir Wood worked for the Southern Railway where he helped to design bridges and the remediation of landslips at Folkestone Warren, Kent. He then spent a period with the Docks and Inland Waterways Executive where he designed and organised the hydraulics laboratory. In 1952 he joined Halcrow, the engineering consultancy, where he began work on the Channel Tunnel, a project he would repeatedly return to over the next twenty years. He worked extensively with tunnels and his projects included the Clyde Tunnel, the Potters Bar rail tunnel, Heathrow Airport's cargo tunnel and the Jubilee Line Extension. Muir Wood also worked on the design of South Africa's 80 km long Orange–Fish River Tunnel, the second-longest water supply tunnel in the world.

Muir Wood was the second chairman of the British Tunnelling Society and was founding president of the International Tunneling Association in 1974 and served as honorary president until his death. He retired from Halcrow as the firm's senior partner on 1 May 1984 but continued to work as an expert witness and specialist consultant. He was closely involved with a campaign launched by New Civil Engineer to rescue Isambard Kingdom Brunel's Thames Tunnel from a plan to shroud its lining with sprayed concrete. Muir Wood was elected president of the Institution of Civil Engineers (ICE) for the November 1977 to November 1978 session. He held a Doctor of Laws degree from the University of Dundee and an Engineering Doctorate from Bristol University where he was also a visiting professor.

== Awards ==
Muir Wood was a fellow of the Royal Society, of the Royal Academy of Engineering and of the ICE. He was also a foreign member of the Royal Swedish Academy of Engineering Sciences. In 1981 he was appointed a fellow of Imperial College London and of his alma mater, Peterhouse. Muir Wood was appointed a Knight Bachelor on 31 December 1981, the knighthood was conferred by Queen Elizabeth II on 23 March 1982. He died on 1 February 2009.

== Personal life ==
Muir Wood was a descendant of John Muir Wood, musician, music publisher and amateur photographer from Edinburgh and Glasgow. Muir Wood was instrumental in the 1987 donation of 900 of his John Muir Wood's photographs to the National Galleries of Scotland.

Professional and academic associations
Preceded by John Walter Baxter	President of the Institution of Civil Engineers; November 1977 – November 1978	Succeeded by Reginald Coates
