= Leopold Halliday Savile =

Scottish civil engineer

Sir Leopold Savile
- Born: Leopold Halliday Savile; 31 August 1870; Bridge of Earn, Perthshire
- Died: 28 January 1953 (aged 82); London, England
- Engineering career
- Discipline: Civil
- Institutions: Institution of Civil Engineers (president), Smeatonian Society of Civil Engineers (president)

Sir Leopold Halliday Savile, KCB (31 August 1870 – 28 January 1953) was a Scottish civil engineer.

Savile was born at Bridge of Earn, Perthshire, the son of Lieutenant-Colonel John Walter Savile and Sarah Emma Stoddart. He was a great-grandson of the MP Christopher Atkinson (later Savile). He was educated at Marlborough College and King's College London. He was a pupil of Sir John Wolfe Barry and Henry Marc Brunel from 1891 to 1896.

In 1931, Savile was elected a member of the Smeatonian Society of Civil Engineers and was their president in 1948. Savile was appointed to the panel of qualified civil engineers required by the Reservoirs Act of 1930 where he was responsible for the design, construction and inspection of reservoirs. At this time he was working for Alexander Gibb and partners. He served as president of the Institution of Civil Engineers between November 1940 and November 1941.

He was appointed a Companion of the Order of the Bath on 1 January 1925. He was appointed a Knight Commander of the same order on 1 March 1929.

In 1904, Savile married Evelyn Stileman, daughter of Frank Stileman, consulting engineer to the Furness Railway Company. They had one daughter. After her death in 1920, he married secondly, in 1929, Lilith Savile (who was his first cousin once removed), daughter of Brigadier-General Walter Clare Savile.

He died in 1953.

Professional and academic associations
Preceded by Clement Hindley	President of the Institution of Civil Engineers; November 1940 – November 1941	Succeeded by Charles Inglis
