= Geoffrey Binnie =

British civil engineer (1908–1989)

Geoffrey Binnie FRS FEng
- Born: Geoffrey Morse Binnie; 13 November 1908
- Died: 5 April 1989 (aged 80)
- Education: Charterhouse School
- Alma mater: Trinity Hall, Cambridge; Zurich University
- Occupations: Civil engineer; Writer
- Parent: William Binnie
- Relatives: Sir Alexander Binnie (paternal grandfather)

Geoffrey Morse Binnie FRS FEng (13 November 1908 – 5 April 1989) was a British civil engineer and writer particularly associated with dams and reservoirs.

Binnie was the third generation of his family to enter civil engineering (his grandfather was Sir Alexander Binnie, and father William Binnie). He was educated at Charterhouse School, Trinity Hall, Cambridge and Zurich University. On graduation, he became a pupil of Swiss engineer Dr Henry Edward Gruner, working on a hydro-electric scheme, Sernf-Niederenbach, in the Alps, and then on a larger project, Albbruck-Dogern on the River Rhine.

He joined the Binnie & Partners firm of consulting engineers in 1931. From 1932 to 1936, he worked on the 88m high Jubilee Dam in Hong Kong, the then highest dam in the British Empire. Upon his return to the UK, he worked on the construction of Eye Brook Reservoir near Corby, Northamptonshire. In 1939, he was appointed a Partner in the family firm.

During World War II, he served in the Royal Engineers. After the war, he worked on various water supply projects in the UK and overseas, including the Kalatuwawa Dam, near Hanwella, which supplies water to Colombo in Sri Lanka. Other major projects included:

- Dukan Dam, on River Tigris, Iraq
- Mangla Dam, on the Jhelum River, Pakistan, today still the world's 16th largest dam.
- the W. A. C. Bennett Dam, part of the Peace River Project, British Columbia, Canada

Binnie retired in December 1972, but remained active on various committees concerned with dams and barrages, including the Severn Barrage Committee from 1977 to 1979. He also researched the history of water and dam engineering; his first book Early Victorian Water Engineers was published in 1981, and in 1987, his second book, Early Dam Builders in Britain was published.

== Honours ==
He was a Fellow of the Institution of Civil Engineers (ICE) and was elected a Fellow of the Royal Society in 1975. During his career, his ICE honours and awards included the Telford Premium (1938), George Stephenson Medal (1959), Telford Gold Medal (1968), the Smeatonian Society's John Smeaton Gold Medal (1974) and the Newcomen Society's Dickinson Medal (1976).

== Legacy ==
His life and work is commemorated by an annual lecture organised by the British Dam Society.
