= British Tunnelling Society =

Professional association of civil engineers

Coordinates: 51.5011°N 0.1290°W

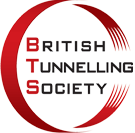
- Associated Society of the Institution of Civil Engineers
- Established: 1971
- Type: Civil Engineering professional association
- Headquarters: One Great George Street; London, SW1
- Region served: United Kingdom
- Fields: Tunnel-related matters
- Members: 800 individual members (as of 2016)
- Key people: Rod Young (BTS Chairman); Alasdair Fraser (BTSYM Chair)
- Affiliations: Institution of Civil Engineers
- Website: britishtunnelling.com

The British Tunnelling Society (BTS) is a professional association established in London, UK, in 1971 by tunnelling professionals, led by Sir Harold Harding. The BTS is a learned society of the Institution of Civil Engineers, its mission being to provide a forum for meetings and discussion on tunnel-related matters.

The BTS took part in the founding of the International Tunneling and Underground Space Association (ITA-AITES) in 1974 and represents the UK on its General Assembly. In 2016, the BTS had 800 members making it one of the largest. The current chairman of the BTS, Rod Young, assumed the position in May 2022.

== Activities ==
The BTS provides a forum for meetings and discussion on tunnel-related matters, the BTS also publishes industry guidelines and codes of practice; conducts training courses to advance the education of tunnelling professionals; promotes the recruitment of young people to the industry; acknowledges excellence in tunnelling; sponsors and supports industry conferences; and advises Government and the general public on the art and science of tunnelling. Additionally, the BTS supports the MSc in Tunnelling and Underground Space at The University of Warwick, by advising on the course structure and facilitating lecturers from industry for many modules.

The BTS organises monthly meeting and the BTS Conference & Exhibition and Harding Memorial Lecture every second year. Named after Sir Harding – the founder of the society.

The official magazine of the BTS is 'Tunnels & Tunnelling International' which is currently published monthly by Progressive Media International. The current editor is Patrick Reynolds.

=== Awards and prizes ===
The BTS awards the James Clarke Medal and Harding Prize annually to recognise the achievements of both eminent and young tunnellers respectively.

==== Harding Prize ====
Named in honour of Sir Harold Harding, the Harding Prize is awarded annually. The entry to the award consists of an original paper relating to any aspect of tunnelling which the entrant considers to be of interest to others in the tunnelling industry and is open to those aged 33 or younger on 1 January of the same year. The papers are then reviewed by a group of BTS committee members and the writers of selected papers are invited to make an oral presentation to the April BTS meeting. The winner is decided by members of the BTS Committee.

==== The James Clark Medal ====
The James Clark Medal is named in honour of James Clark, who worked for Charles Brand and Sons on many well-known tunnels. In 1981 his widow, Madeline, bequeathed a sum of money to provide a medal to be awarded annually to a British Tunneller to perpetuate James' memory. The original criteria were: contemporary achievement in tunnelling; or innovation or responsibility for a large project. In the mid-1980s the medal was not awarded, and with Madeline's approval a third criterion was added: a major contribution to the tunnelling industry. The James Clark Medal is the highest honour awarded by The British Tunnelling Society and has been awarded to:

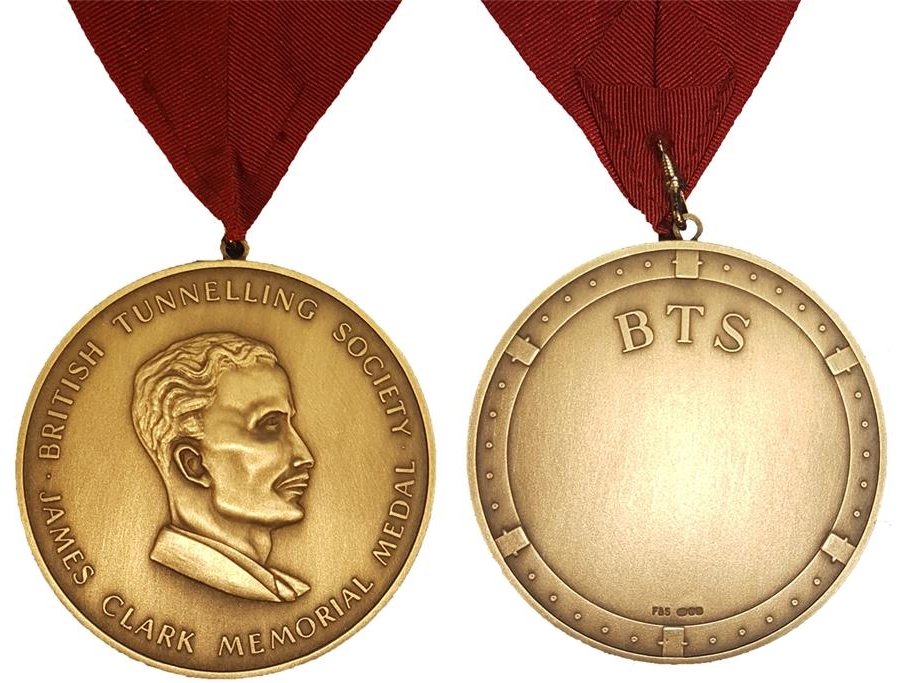
James Clark Medal (front & rear)

- 2024 -David Hindle
- 2023 - Andy Alder
- 2022 - Ken Spiby
- 2021 - Bob Ibell
- 2020 - Helen Nattrass
- 2019 - Mike King
- 2018 - David Donaldson
- 2017 - Joseph Gallagher
- 2016 - Alan Runacres
- 2015 - Doug Allenby
- 2014 - Peter Jaques
- 2013 - Andy Sindall
- 2012 - David Court
- 2011 - Terry Mellors
- 2010 - Martin Knights
- 2009 - Donald Lamont MBE
- 2008 - Jack Knight
- 2007 - Tommy Talbot
- 2006 - Alan Dyke
- 2005 - Maurice Gooderham
- 2004 - Rodney Craig
- 2003 - James Buchanan
- 2002 - Dennis Walder
- 2001 - David C Wallis
- 2000 - Denis S Lawrenson
- 1999 - Colin N P Mackenzie
- 1998 - Dr Myles O'Reilly
- 1997 - Gerard Pakes
- 1996 - Hugh Docherty
- 1995 - Dick Watts
- 1994 - John Bartlett OBE
- 1994 - Sir Alan Muir Wood
- 1993 - R Remington
- 1992 - Oliver M Bevan
- 1991 - Alastair J Biggart
- 1991- John King
- 1991 - Colin J Kirkland
- 1990 - David Martin
- 1989 - R J S McBean
- 1988 - Gordon Ince
- 1985/86/87 Not Awarded
- 1984 - K H Moore
- 1983 - David A Harries, A C Lyons
- 1982 - J Sheridan
- 1981 - E Whyte

=== Publications ===
Over the years, The BTS and its Working Groups have published, or collaborated with others to publish, numerous best practice and other guides. These publications include:

- Traditional Timbering in Soft Ground Tunnelling : A Historical Review (2014)
- Monitoring Underground Construction: A best practice guide (2011)
- The Specification for Tunnelling ( 2010)
- The Tunnel Lining Design Guide (2004)
- The Closed-face tunnelling machines and ground stability report (2005)
- Joint Code of Practice for Risk Management of Tunnel Works in the UK (2003)
- Hand Arm Vibration Syndrome (HAVS) : A Guide to Good Practice (2006)
- Occupational Exposure to Nitrogen Monoxide : Best Practice Guide (2008)
- A Guide to the Work in Compressed Air Regulations (1996)
- Guidance for good working practice in high pressure compressed air (2015)

The BTS has also actively participated in the production or revision of a number of key standards for the tunnelling industry:

- BS6164: Code of Practice for Health & Safety in Tunnelling
- BS EN 815: Safety of unshielded tunnel boring machines and rodless shaft boring machines for rock.
- BS EN 12110: Tunnelling machines Air locks Safety requirements
- BS EN 12111: Tunnelling machines Road headers, continuous miners and impact rippers Safety requirements.
- BS EN 12336: Tunnelling machines Shield machines, thrust boring machines, auger boring machines, lining erection equipment Safety requirements.

== Former BTS Chairmen ==
- John Corcoran (2022-Present)
- Kate Cooksey (2020-2022)
- Ivor Thomas (2018–2020)
- Mark Leggett (2016–2018)
- Roger Bridge (2014–2016)
- Damian McGirr (2012–2014)
- Robert Ibell (2010–2012)
- Paul Hoyland (2008–2010)
- Bill Grose (2006–2008)
- David Court (2004–2006)
- Anthony Umney (2002–2004)
- Peter South (2000–2002)
- David Wallis (1999–2000)
- Eric Snowdon (1997–1999)
- David Fawcett (1995–1997)
- Colin Mackenzie (1993–1995)
- Roy Jennion (1991–1993)
- Dr Terry Mellors (1989–1991)
- David Donaldson (1987–1989)
- Colin Kirkland (1985–1987)
- Steven Tough (1983–1985)
- Oliver Bevan (1981–1983)
- Douglas Parkes (1979–1981)
- John Bartlett (1977–1979)
- John King (1976–1977)
- Sir Alan Muir Wood (1975–1976)
- Douglas Parkes (1973–1974)
- Sir Alan Muir Wood (1972–1973)
- Sir Harold Harding (1971–1973)

== National Tunnelling Day ==
The British Tunnelling Society (BTS) announced the UK's first National Tunnelling Day to take place on Thursday, 3 December 2015. The aim of the day is to generate interest in the great number of world class tunnelling projects currently being undertaken in the UK and to promote the industry (and its many professions) to young people and students of all ages. The day will be an annual event occurring on, or in proximity to, the Feast Day of St. Barbara, traditionally seen as the Patron Saint of Tunnellers in the UK.
