= Zhou Shunhua =

Chinese academic (born 1964)

- 周顺华
- Born: 1964 (age 61–62); Jiangshan, Zhejiang, China
- Education: Southwest Jiaotong University
- Awards: State Technological Invention Award (Second Class) (2015, 2018); ITA "Beyond Engineering" Award (2022); China Railway Society Science and Technology Award (Grand Prize) (2022); Ho Leung Ho Lee Foundation Prize for Scientific and Technological Advancement (2025)
- Scientific career
- Fields: Rail transit engineering safety
- Workplaces: Tongji University

Zhou Shunhua (Chinese: 周顺华; pinyin: Zhōu Shùnhuá; born 1964) is a distinguished professor at Tongji University. His research focuses on the safety and deformation control of high-speed railway (HSR) and urban rail-transit infrastructure. He has developed theories and engineering methods for controlling millimetre-scale deformation of railway geotechnical structures during construction and long-term operation. According to Tongji University, he led the development of the world's first technical standard for construction beneath operating HSR lines. Zhou received the State Technological Invention Award (Second Class) twice, in 2015 and 2018, and the Ho Leung Ho Lee Foundation Prize for Scientific and Technological Progress in 2025. According to public data, He has also been shortlisted as a candidate for the Chinese Academy of Sciences in 2019 ,2021 and 2023.

== Life and career ==
Zhou was born in Jiangshan, Zhejiang province. He attended Southwest Jiaotong University, where he received his bachelor's degree in tunnel and underground railway engineering in 1985, his master's degree in structural mechanics in 1988, and his PhD in bridge and tunnel engineering in 1997.

In 1988, Zhou joined the faculty of Shanghai Tiedao University (merged into Tongji University in 2000), serving successively as an assistant lecturer, lecturer, associate professor, and professor. Since 2000, he has been a professor and doctoral supervisor at the college of Transportation Engineering, Tongji University. He currently serves as the director of the Shanghai Key Laboratory of Rail Infrastructure Durability and System Safety and as an executive director of the China Railway Society.

== Research ==
Zhou's research is dedicated to advancing the safety of rail transit systems, particularly HSR. He has developed technologies for millimeter-level deformation control of HSR subgrades in soft soils, and for non-speed-reduction underpassing construction beneath operating HSR lines. His research has been applied to major projects such as the Beijing–Shanghai high-speed railway and the Qinghai–Tibet railway.

According to public data, the "Technical Code for Highway and Municipal Engineering Underpassing High-speed Railway," edited by Zhou, has been adopted in approximately 6900 railway-related projects within five years of its publication. The standard has also been translated into English and adopted in regions including the European Union, Japan, Israel, and South Korea.

According to Tongji University, Zhou has published more than 200 SCI-indexed papers, holds over 90 granted Chinese invention patents, and has received more than 13,000 citations excluding self-citations. From 2022 to 2026, Zhou was listed among the world's top 2% scientists in both the career-long and single-year scientific impact rankings published by Elsevier.

== International collaboration ==
Zhou has actively pursued international research collaborations in granular mechanics and high-speed railway geotechnical engineering, notably with researchers in Canada and Germany.

Zhou has maintained a long-standing research collaboration with Peijun Guo at McMaster University in Canada, focusing on granular mechanic. Their collaborative work includes the development of a specialized triaxial testing apparatus capable of reproducing the high-frequency, low-amplitude cyclic loading conditions associated with high-speed railway operations, achieving loading frequencies of up to 150 Hz and precise control of low-amplitude cyclic stresses. Based on this equipment, they found that high-frequency vibrations can cause substantial reductions in the shear resistance of granular soils and soil–structure interfaces under certain conditions providing insights for construction and maintenance of HSR subgrade. These findings have also attracted attention beyond conventional geotechnical engineering. For example, researchers from NASA drew upon this research to investigate ultrasonic penetration into lunar regolith simulants under reduced-gravity conditions, extending the investigation of these mechanical phenomena to planetary exploration research.

Zhou has also contributed to research on next-generation HSRs operating at speeds exceeding 400 km/h. Through a joint research project funded by the National Natural Science Foundation of China (NSFC) and the German Research Foundation (DFG), he collaborated with Frank Rackwitz of Technische Universität Berlin to investigate the dynamic response of high-speed railway infrastructure supported by multilayered soils, with particular emphasis on nonlinear soil behaviour at train speeds exceeding 400 km/h.

== Teaching and supervision ==
Professor Zhou has supervised over 200 doctoral and master's students. His graduates are widely regarded as a highly capable and well-rounded group, with more than 40 receiving prestigious honors and awards, like Humboldt Research Fellowship, China's National High-level Talent Program, the National May 1 Labor Medal, and Provincial Model Worker titles. Professor Zhou himself has been recognized with distinctions including Shanghai's Top Ten Good People and Good Deeds Award. He also received the Shanghai Teaching Achievement Award (First Prize) in 2017 for his contributions to innovative talent development in railway engineering.

== Typical awards and honors ==
Zhou received the Shanghai Science and Technology Progress Award (First Class) in 2016. He was awarded the State Technological Invention Award (Second Class) twice, in 2015 and 2018. In 2022, his team received the "Beyond Engineering" Award from the International Tunneling and Underground Space Association (ITA) and the Grand Prize of the China Railway Society Science and Technology Award. In 2024, he won the First Class Prize of the China Railway Society Science and Technology Award. In 2025, he won the Ho Leung Ho Lee Foundation Prize for Scientific and Technological Advancement.
