= Mārtiņš Rītiņš =

British-born Latvian chef (1949–2022)

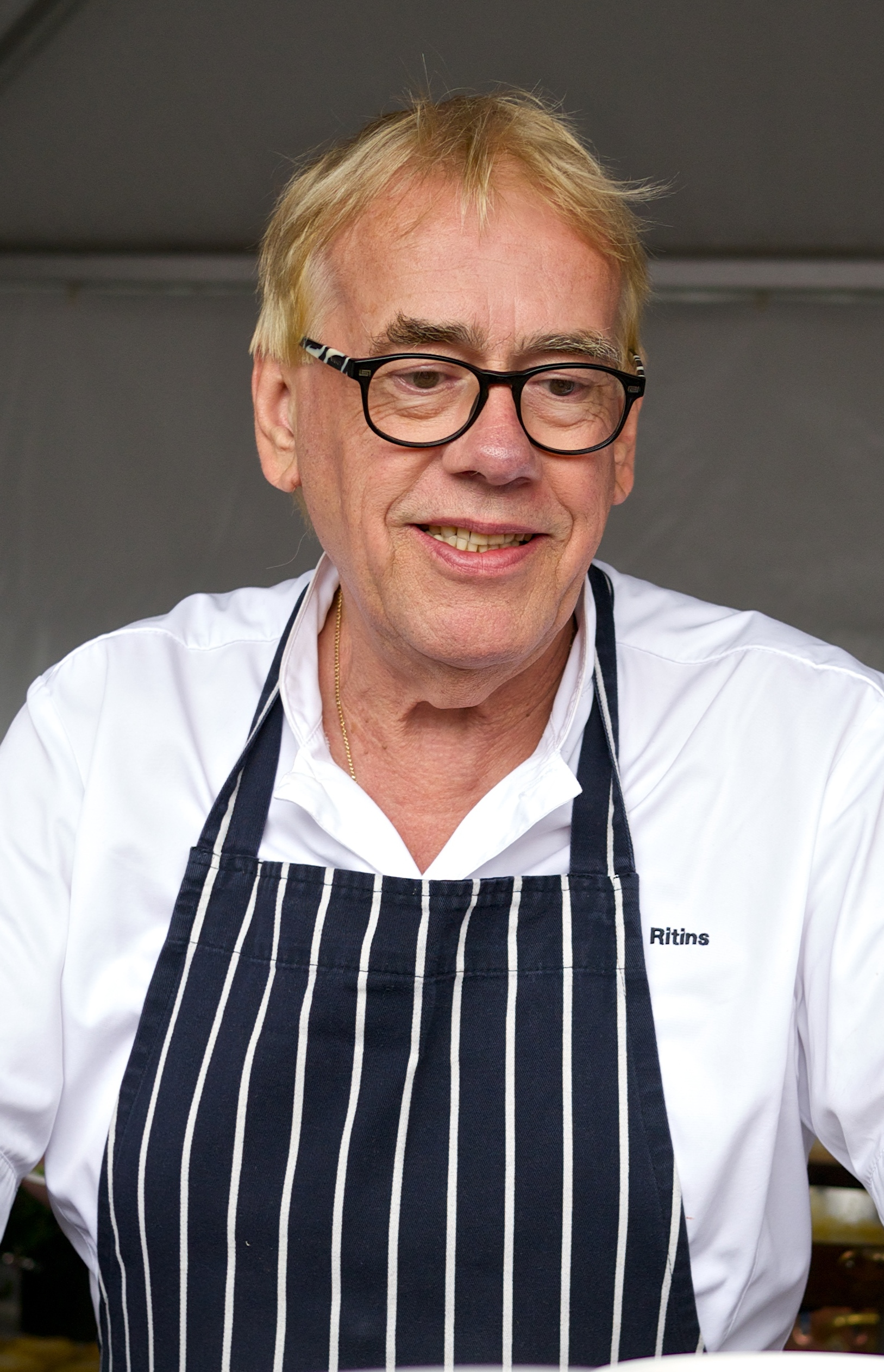
- Mārtiņš Rītiņš 2014
- Born: Mārtiņš Ints Rītiņš; 19 October 1949; Nantwich, Cheshire, England
- Died: 11 February 2022 (aged 72); Riga, Latvia
- Education: Westminster Technical College
- Culinary career
- Cooking style: Modern Latvian
- Current restaurant
- Vincents (1994–2017; 2020–2021)
- Television shows
- Kas var būt labāks par šo? (1995–2015), Tuč, tuč Rītiņš (2018–2019)

Mārtiņš Ints Rītiņš (19 October 1949 – 11 February 2022) was a British-born Latvian chef, restaurateur, businessman, culinary TV presenter and author. He was also the President of Latvian Slow Food Association and has been called "The Father of Modern Latvian Cuisine".

== Biography ==
Rītiņš was born in 1949 at a refugee camp in Nantwich, Cheshire, to Latvian parents who had fled Latvia from the advancing Red Army at the end of World War II. He grew up in Corby, Northamptonshire before moving to London to become a chef.

In 1971, Rītiņš graduated from Westminster Technical College in London. From the mid-1970s to the early 1990s, he worked for various catering companies in the Grand Metropolitan hotel chain. From 1984 to 1992, Rītiņš owned Martins Catering Ltd in Toronto, Canada.

In 1993, he moved to Latvia and founded the restaurant Vincents a year later, becoming its director and executive chef. In 1995, Rītiņš started hosting his own cooking television show on LTV Kas var būt labāks par šo? ("What Could Be Better Than This?"), where he travelled around the world and introduced foreign ingredients and dishes to the Latvian audience. In 1997, Rītiņš published a cookbook Mielasts ar Mārtiņu ("A Meal With Mārtiņš").

From the late 1990s and early 2000s, he started organizing official state banquets and dinners, and catering to royalty, presidents and celebrities, such as Akihito, Xi Jinping, Queen Elizabeth II, George W. Bush, Tony Blair, Romano Prodi, Angela Merkel, and Sir Elton John. In the early 2000s, Rītiņš created an open-air farmers' market in Riga where farmers could sell their produce directly to consumers on Friday and Saturday evenings. In 2005, he became the president of the Latvian Slow Food Association which organized slow food festivals across the country, where Rītiņš would perform cooking demonstrations.

In 2007, Rītiņš received the Order of the Three Stars for his "service to gastronomy and culinary education in Latvia". In 2009, he collaborated with the Latvian national airline airBaltic to design their inflight menu using organic locally grown ingredients, which was praised by CNN. In 2015, Kas var būt labāks par šo? was discontinued due to disagreements between Rītiņš and the director of the show. Three years later Rītiņš returned to television with a television cooking show on LNT called Tuč, tuč Rītiņš.

On 1 July 2017, he retired as the director of Vincents, but returned to it in 2020. The same year his biography De Profundis written by a close family friend Linda Apse was published.

On 11 February 2022, Rītiņš died of complications from COVID-19 at Pauls Stradiņš Clinical University Hospital in Riga, at the age of 72.

== Cooking style and influences ==
Rītiņš has described his cooking style as "fine dining influenced by Escoffier". It is rooted in French cuisine, which was what he was brought up on. Rītiņš has characterised his cooking as much lighter, less greasy and less fatty than the traditional Latvian cuisine, which he jokingly summarized as "pork, pork, pork, pork", although confessing to liking grey peas with speck. He recalled that during the early days in Latvia, this meant that his Caesar salad was sometimes sent back because it did not contain mayonnaise as Latvians were used to. Rītiņš has named Alice Waters and his first boss Harvey Smith, as his culinary mentors.

== Legacy ==
Many prominent Latvian chefs, nicknamed "Rītiņš’ Boys", have worked under Mārtiņš Rītiņš at "Vincents", such as Kaspars Jansons, the executive chef of "Muusu", Māris Jansons of "Bibliotēka Nr. 1", Ēriks Dreibants of "Restorāns 3" and "3 pavāru restorāns "Tam labam būs augt"", Ivans Šmigarevs of "Marčers" shop and café, and Jānis Zvirbulis, the executive chef of Hotel Bergs.

Rītiņš is also credited for reintroducing asparagus in Latvian cuisine, which largely fell out of use after the Soviet occupation of Latvia.

== Books ==
- Mārtiņš Rītiņš (1997). Mielasts ar Mārtiņu. Jumava. ISBN 978-9-984-05095-9
