= Clement Hindley =

British civil engineer and railway administrator (1874–1944)

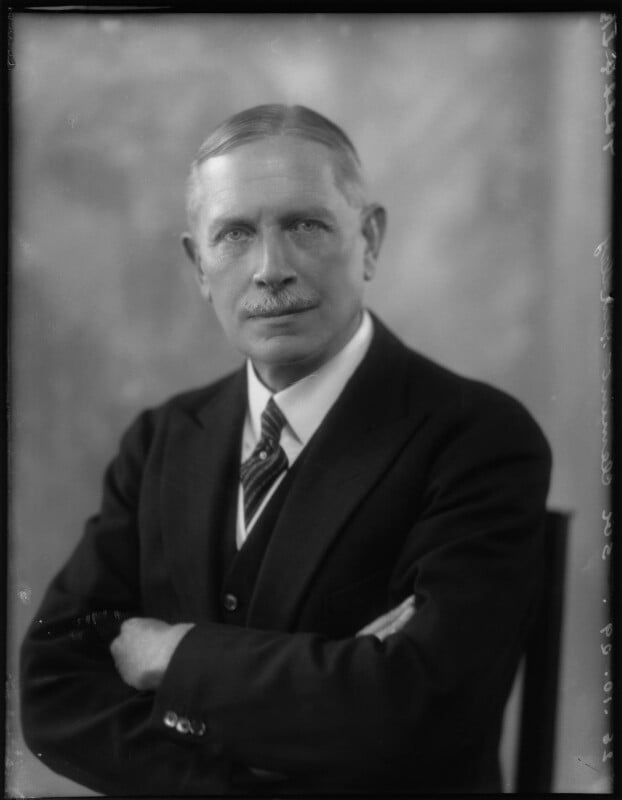
Hindley in 1929

Sir Clement Daniel Maggs Hindley KCIE (19 December 1874 – 3 May 1944) was a British civil engineer. Hindley spent much of his life working in Bengal for the East Indian Railway Company eventually becoming their general manager. He also served as India's first Chief Commissioner of Railways bringing about the nationalisation of the East Indian and Great Indian Peninsular railways, the reorganisation of the Railway Department and establishing the Railway Staff College at Dehradun. His work for the railways was recognised with a knighthood and an appointment as Knight Commander of the Order of the Indian Empire and as a Commander of the Order of Leopold by the Belgian government.

Hindley returned to Britain in 1928 becoming the first chairman of the Racecourse Betting Control Board, as well as a member of the Advisory Council for Scientific and Industrial Research and the board of the National Physical Laboratory. He also served as chairman of the first research committee of the Institution of Civil Engineers and later as the institution's president. Hindley worked extensively with the Ministry of Works and the Air Raid Precautions service during the Second World War, particularly on civil defence and reconstruction matters.

== Early life ==
Hindley was born in Dulwich, London to Charles Hugh Hindley, a carpet salesman and his wife Mary. Clement received an education from Dulwich College before studying mechanical sciences at Trinity College, Cambridge from which he graduated with a Bachelor of Arts degree in 1896. In 1897 he was appointed as assistant engineer to the East Indian Railway Company in Bengal where he met and married Anne Rait of Murshidabad with whom he would father three sons.

== East Indian Railway ==
Hindley visited the United States and Canada in 1904 on behalf of the Institution of Civil Engineers, returning to India in 1905 as personal assistant to the chief engineer of the East Indian railway. He was put in charge of the technical section of the agent's office in 1906, responsible for checking all plans and estimates for engineering works, before becoming the manager for the Delhi district of the railway. He became the secretary of the company in 1914, deputy general manager in 1918 and the general manager in 1920.

== Chief Commissioner of Railways ==
Hindley left the company in 1921 for a position as chairman of the commissioner for the Port of Calcutta before becoming the first Chief Commissioner of Railways for India the next year. This latter role made him the chief advisor to the Indian government on railways and he used this to institute a reform of the railway sector including the opening of the Railway Staff College, the reorganisation of the Railway Department and the bringing of the East Indian and Great Indian Peninsular railways into public ownership. He brought the railways back to an efficient state following the decline of investment during the First World War and constructed more than 4000 miles of new routes before his retirement in 1928. In recognition of his services to India he was knighted in the 1925 Birthday Honours and was appointed a Knight Commander of the Order of the Indian Empire in 1929. He was also made a commander of the Belgian Order of Leopold.

== Return to Britain ==
Returning to Britain in 1928, Hindley was appointed the first chairman of the Racecourse Betting Control Board whose task was to regulate betting at racecourses across the country. He later served on the Advisory Council for Scientific and Industrial Research and on the board of the National Physical Laboratory. Hindley was a keen member of the Institution of Civil Engineers (ICE) and in 1935 was made chairman of the new research committee before serving as vice president of the institution for the 1938–39 session and as president for 1939–40.

== War work ==
Following the outbreak of the Second World War, Hindley's position as president of the ICE made him useful to the war effort and he was employed as a works advisor to the London civil defence region committee and as chairman of the Air Raid Precautions committee to limit damage to structures and enginineering works for the Home Office. In 1940, he was appointed as chair of the committee to consider post war reconstruction for the Ministry of Works and Buildings.

By 1944, Hindley was also the chairman of the Codes of Practice Committee for Civil Engineering and Building for the Minister of Works and of the Civil Engineering Industries Holidays With Pay Scheme, an industry wide board regulating paid holidays for construction workers.

== Death ==
He died in his 70th year at his home in Hampton, in the county of Middlesex on 3 May 1944.

Professional and academic associations
| Preceded by William Binnie | President of the Institution of Civil Engineers; November 1939 – November 1940 | Succeeded by Leopold Halliday Savile |
