= Vinayaditya =

Vinayaditya may refer to any of the following kings who ruled in present-day India:

- Vinayaditya of Vatapi (r. c. 680–696), a ruler of the Chalukya dynasty of Vatapi, titled Yuddhamalla
- Vinayaditya of Podana (r. c. 750-755 CE), a ruler of the Chalukya dynasty of Vemulavada, titled Yuddhamalla
- Vinayaditya (Hoysala dynasty) (r. c. 1047-1098), a ruler of the Hoysala dynasty of Dvarasamudra

== See also ==
- Vinay (disambiguation)
- Aditya (disambiguation)
