= International Commission on Large Dams =

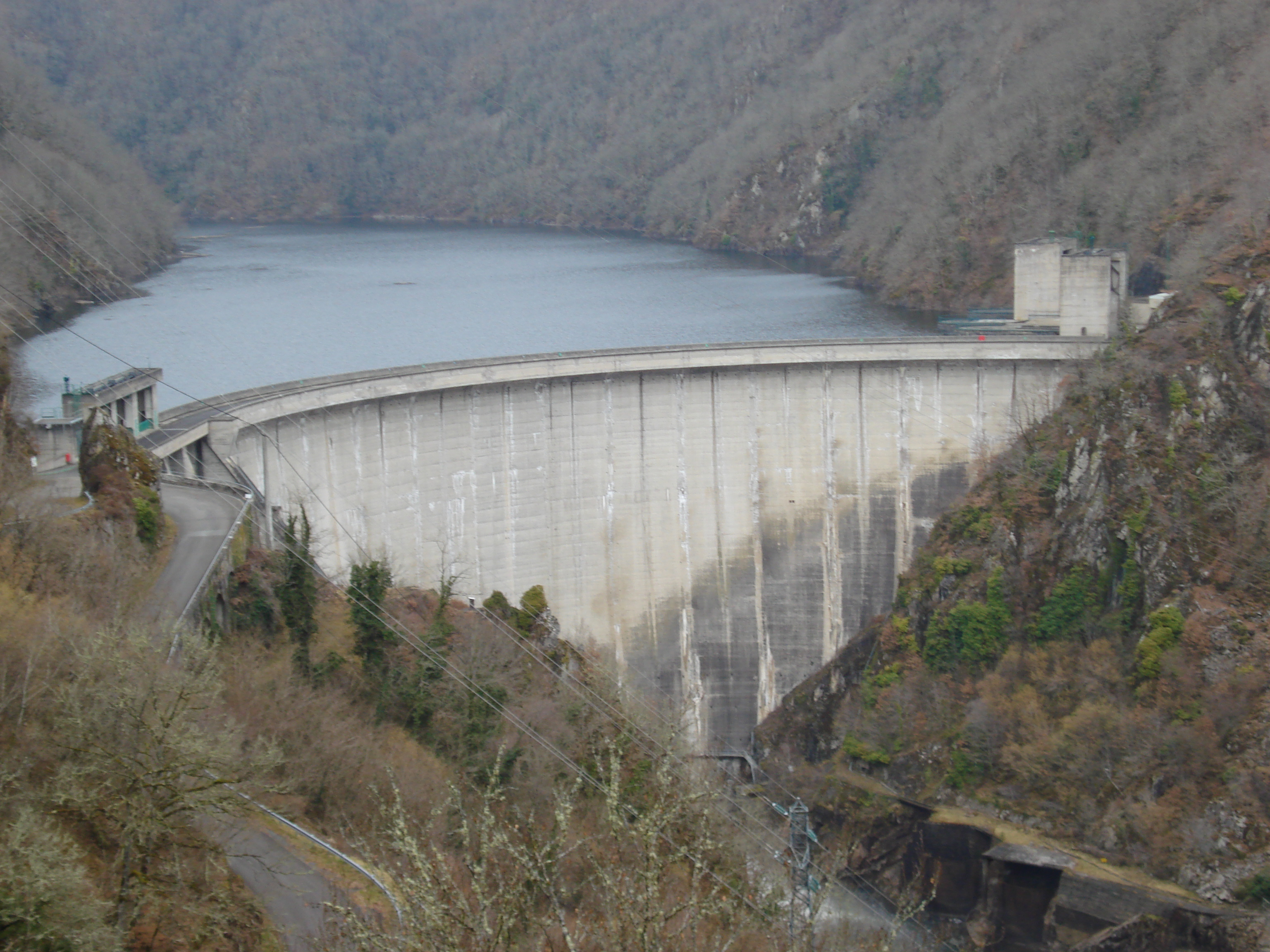
Marèges Dam in France

The International Commission on Large Dams, or ICOLD (French: Commission Internationale des Grands Barrages or CIGB), is an international non-governmental organization dedicated to the sharing of professional information and knowledge of the design, construction, maintenance, and impact of large dams.

== Overview ==
It was founded in 1928 and has its central office in Paris, France.

ICOLD consists of 100 member national committees which have a total membership of about 10,000 individuals.

Official languages of the commission are English and French.

== Definition ==
For the purpose of inclusion in the World Register of Dams, a large dam is defined as any dam above 15 metres in height (measured from the lowest point of foundation to top of dam) or any dam between 10 and 15 metres in height which meets at least one of the following conditions:

a) the crest length is not less than 500 metres;
b) the capacity of the reservoir formed by the dam is not less than one million cubic metres;
c) the maximum flood discharge dealt with by the dam is not less than 2 000 cubic metres per second;
d) the dam had specially difficult foundation problems;
e) the dam is of unusual design.
- ICOLD's definition of "large dam".

== See also ==
- United States Society on Dams is the member organization representing the US in ICOLD.
- British Dam Society is the United Kingdom national committee for ICOLD.
- Australian National Committee on Large Dams (ANCOLD) is the Australia national committee for ICOLD.
