= British Dam Society =

British professional association

Coordinates: 51.5011°N 0.1290°W

- Established: 1965
- Type: Civil engineering professional association
- Headquarters: One Great George Street, London, England
- Region served: United Kingdom
- Members: 575 (2017)
- Affiliations: Associated Society of the Institution of Civil Engineers
- Website: www.britishdams.org

The British Dam Society was established in London, UK, in 1965 and is a learned 'Associated Society' of the Institution of Civil Engineers and a registered charity in England and Wales (No. 1113476).

BDS aims to advance public and professional understanding of technical subjects relating to the planning, design, construction, maintenance, operation, safety, environmental and social issues that are involved with dams and reservoir projects. It holds a biennial conference and lecture (the Geoffrey Binnie Lecture), publishes a journal Dams & Reservoirs, and acts as the United Kingdom national committee of ICOLD.

It also provides expert commentary on dam-related safety issues; for example, in 2012, it expressed concern to Defra about the timetable for the registration, inspection and risk assessment of UK reservoirs.
