= Australian National Committee on Large Dams =

- Abbreviation: ANCOLD
- Formation: 1937; 89 years ago
- Headquarters: 227 Collins Street, Hobart, Tasmania
- Region served: Australia
- Members: 54 member organisations; 195 individual associate members
- Chairman: Shane McGrath
- Main organ: Executive Committee
- Affiliations: International Commission on Large Dams (ICOLD)
- Website: www.ancold.org.au

The Australian National Committee on Large Dams (abbreviated as ANCOLD) is an Australian-based non-government, non-profit and voluntary association of organisations and individual professionals with a common technical interest in large dams and their environs. ANCOLD is not an advocate for dams but an apolitical industry body that focuses on disseminating knowledge, developing capability and providing guidance on all aspects of dam engineering, management and associated issues.

ANCOLD is a member of the International Commission on Large Dams (or ICOLD).

== Role and functions ==
ANCOLD maintains a register of large dams in Australia, of which approximately 490 dams were listed on the register in 1999. By international convention, "large" dams are those that are 15 metres (49 ft) or more in height, although a dam over 10 metres (33 ft) qualifies if it has particular features such as large storage or specially difficult foundation conditions.

The association awards scholarships to young professionals to attend the annual ANCOLD conference.

== Publications ==
Publications include a quarterly newsletter, and:

- Guidelines on design floods for dams - 1986
- Register of large dams in Australia - 1990
- Status of dam safety in Australia - 1990
- Guidelines on dam safety management - 1994
- Guidelines on risk assessment - 1994
- Guidelines on design of dams for earthquakes - 1998
- Dam technology in Australia 1850-1999 - 2000
