= United States Society on Dams =

Professional association

The United States Society on Dams is a professional association headquartered in Westminster, Colorado that is dedicated to:

- Advancing the knowledge of dam engineering, construction, planning, operation, performance, rehabilitation, decommissioning, maintenance, security and safety;
- Fostering dam technology for socially, environmentally and financially sustainable water resources systems;
- Providing public awareness of the role of dams in the management of the nation's water resources;
- Enhancing practices to meet current and future challenges on dams; and
- Representing the United States as an active member of the International Commission on Large Dams (ICOLD).
