= Vinay =

Vinay is an Indian name typically meaning guidance, good behaviour, genuinity, politeness, modesty and smart in Sanskrit. It has its origins in the Sanskrit language origin. Most Indian languages spell and pronounce the name as is in Sanskrit but in a few other languages such as Bengali and Odiya, changes either in spelling or pronunciation or both occur. For example, it may be used as, Binay in Bengali-speaking and Odia- speaking regions. Feminine form of the name is Vinaya or Vinayaa. Binay is also a surname popular in Philippines.

Vinay may refer to:

== People ==
=== Academics ===
- Vinay V. Deodhar, a professor of mathematics at Indiana University
- Vinay Kumar (pathologist), Professor of Pathology at the University of Chicago
- Vinay Kumar Pathak, Indian academic
- Vinay Lal, Indian historian

=== Arts and entertainment ===
- Vinay Anand, Indian actor
- Vinay Apte, Indian actor
- Vinay Chandra Maudgalya, Indian classical musician
- Vinay Forrt, Indian actor
- Vinay Govind, Indian film director
- Vinay Pathak, Indian actor
- Vinay Rai, Indian actor
- Vinay Rajkumar, Indian actor
- Vinay Rohrra, Indian actor
- Vinay Saynekar, Indian type designer, calligrapher
- Vinay Shukla, Indian film writer and director
- Winai Kraibutr, Thai actor

=== Business ===
- Vinay Nair, American investor
- Vinay Nadkarni, Indian banker

=== Politics and government ===
- Vinay Bhaskar, Indian politician
- Vinay Katiyar, Indian politician
- Vinay Kore, Indian politician
- Vinay Kumar Pandey, Indian politician
- Vinay Kumar Sorake, Indian politician
- Vinay Sahasrabuddhe, Indian politician
- Winai Senniam, Thai politician

=== Science and technology ===
- Vinay Prasad, American hematologist-oncologist
- Winai Dahlan, Thai Scientist

=== Sports ===
- Vinay Bhat, American chess Grandmaster
- Vinay Kumar, Indian cricketer
- Vinay Singh, Indian footballer

== Others ==
- 21644 Vinay, a main belt asteroid with an orbital period of 1370.4239593 days (3.75 years)
- Jean-Baptiste-Maximien Parchappe de Vinay, French psychiatrist
- Ranvir Vinay Aur Kaun?, Indian Hindi talk show
- Vinay, Isère, commune in the Isère department in southeastern France
- Vinay, Marne, commune in the Marne department in north-eastern France
