= Binny (surname) =

Binny is a surname, and may refer to:

- Roger Binny (born 1955), Indian cricketer
- Ronald Binny (1910–1979), English British Indian Army officer and cricketer
- Stuart Binny (born 1984), Indian cricketer, son of Roger Binny
- Vinod Kumar Binny (born 1973), Indian politician
