= David Davies (electrical engineer) =

British engineer and educator (1935–2025)

Professor Sir David Davies CBE FRS FREng FIEE FLSW
- Born: 28 October 1935; Cardiff, Wales
- Died: 19 August 2025 (aged 89)
- Engineering career
- Institutions: University College London
- Employer: Loughborough University
- Awards: Knight Bachelor; Commander of the Order of the British Empire

Sir David Evan Naunton Davies (28 October 1935 – 19 August 2025) was a British electrical engineer and educator, knighted for services to science and technology in the 1994 New Year Honours. He was described as "one of the most influential engineers of his generation, advising the government on some of the most sensitive political and defence issues in modern times. He also made important technical contributions to the development of radar and communications and to higher education policy". Davies died on 19 August 2025, at the age of 89.

== Career ==
- 1985–1988: Head of the Department of Electronic and Electrical Engineering at University College London (UCL), and holder of the Pender Chair, having already been lecturing there, in Communications Systems, for many years prior to that.
- 1986–1988: Vice-Provost of University College London
- 1988–1993: Vice Chancellor of Loughborough University
- 1993–1999: Chief Scientific Adviser for the Ministry of Defence

He was subsequently Chairman of Railway Safety, a non-executive director of Lattice plc, a non-executive director of The ERA Foundation, Chairman of the Hazards Forum (2002–2010), and safety advisor to the Board of National Grid plc.

== Voluntary roles ==
- 1994–1995: President of the Institution of Electrical Engineers (IEE)
- 1996–2001: President of the Royal Academy of Engineering

== Awards and honours ==
- CBE (Commander of the Order of the British Empire),
- Knight Bachelor
- FREng (Fellow of the Royal Academy of Engineering) in 1979
- FRS (Fellow of the Royal Society) in 1984
- Faraday Medal, Institution of Electrical Engineers, 1987
- Received an honorary doctorate from University of Bath in 1997
- Received an honorary doctorate from Heriot-Watt University in 1999
- FLSW (Founding Fellow of the Learned Society of Wales), 2010

The Sir David Davies building at Loughborough University, housing the electrical engineering department, is now named after him and his portrait by Bryan Organ is displayed in the reception area of the University's Hazlerigg building.

== Sources ==
- Swain, Harriet; Williams, Lynne (15 October 1999). "David (D. E. N.) Davies". Times Higher Education (THE).

Academic offices
Preceded by Professor John Phillips	Vice-Chancellor of Loughborough University; 1988–1993	Succeeded by Professor Sir David Wallace
