= Harold Harding =

British civil engineer

- Born: 6 January 1900; Wandsworth, London
- Died: 27 March 1986 (aged 86); Topsham, Devon
- Education: City and Guilds College
- Spouse: Sophie Blair Leighton
- Children: 3
- Engineering career
- Discipline: Civil
- Institutions: Institution of Civil Engineers (president), British Tunnelling Society (chairman); Fellowship of Engineering (fellow); City and Guilds of London Institute (fellow); Imperial College London (fellow)
- Practice name: Mowlem, Soil Mechanics Ltd
- Projects: Piccadilly Circus tube station, Central line

Sir Harold John Boyer Harding (6 January 1900 – 27 March 1986) was a British civil engineer. Harding was educated at Christ's Hospital and the City and Guilds College (part of Imperial College London), interrupting his studies 1918–19 with a one-year period spent as a cadet in the Officers' Training Corps. Following graduation Harding worked for Mowlem where he specialised in tunnelling work for London Underground including the reconstruction of Piccadilly Circus tube station and the expansion of the Central line. In the 1930s he and Mowlem were instrumental in introducing geotechnical processes to the UK.

Upon the outbreak of the Second World War, Harding was placed in charge of defence and emergency repair of underground services in London. He built pre-cast concrete petrol barges and eight of the Mulberry Harbour segments used in the Normandy Landings. He was also a founding director of Soil Mechanics Ltd, a subsidiary of Mowlem dedicated to work in geotechnics. After the war Harding was involved with investigations into the feasibility of construction of a Channel Tunnel and sat on the tribunal investigating the Aberfan disaster of 1966.

Harding was elected president of the Institution of Civil Engineers, was the founding chairman of the British Tunnelling Society, fellow of the City and Guilds of London Institute and fellow of Imperial College. He was also a founder fellow of the Fellowship of Engineering and governor of three separate academic institutions: Westminster Technical College. Northampton Engineering College, and Imperial College. He received a knighthood in 1968.

== Early life ==
Harding was born in Wandsworth, London to Arthur Boyer Harding and his wife Helen Clinton Lowe, daughter of William Lowe, the vicar of Bunbury. His father died in 1902 and the family spent the next four years in South Africa with his mother's sister and her husband. Harold and his brother were educated at their uncle's expense at Christ's Hospital, Horsham and Harold entered the City and Guilds College (a part of Imperial College London) in 1917. He served as a full-time Officers' Training Corps cadet in 1918 before resuming his studies in 1919. He graduated with a Bachelor of Science degree in engineering in 1922.

== Work with Mowlem ==
Upon graduation Harding joined John Mowlem & Co., an engineering contractor, where he worked on the development of the London Underground network including the reconstruction of the Piccadilly Circus tube station from 1926 to 1929. In 1927 he married Sophie Helen Blair Leighton, an artist with whom he had constructed a model of the Piccadilly works that later found its way to the Science Museum and is now in the London Transport Museum. Sophie was the daughter of the Pre-Raphaelite inspired painter Edmund Leighton. The Hardings had a daughter and two sons. During this period Harding was the first to employ the technique of dewatering of soil in the UK and the first to use the Joosten process of stabilisation by two part chemical injection.

In 1931 Harding worked on the construction of the new Ford Motor Company plant at Dagenham. Major foundation problems had to be overcome during the works as the plant was sited on the spot where Cornelius Vermuyden had closed a breach in the Thames in 1621–22. From this experience Harding developed an interest in chemical consolidation techniques and was a pioneer in their use. He also developed a belief in the value of the use of compressed air in difficult ground. He was in charge of the 1936–39 extension of the London Underground's Central line from Bow Road tube station to Leytonstone.

== World War Two ==
Following the outbreak of the Second World War Harding was placed in charge of defence and emergency repair of underground services in London. In 1942 he co-founded Soil Mechanics Ltd, a subsidiary of Mowlem which was the first construction company concerned with geotechnics. The other founding directors were Rudolph Glossop and Hugh Golder, who later founded Golder Associates. From 1943 to 1944 Harding was involved with the pre-casting of concrete and built several petrol barges and eight of the Mulberry Harbour segments which were used in the Normandy Landings.

== Post-war ==
After the war Harding was increasingly involved with the management of Soil Mechanics Ltd and served as a director of it from 1949 to 1955 and also as a director of Mowlem from 1950 to 1956. Following this he worked independently as a consultant and arbitrator in the UK and abroad until 1978. He was the UK consultant with René Malcor his colleague and French counterpart from 1958 to 1970 of the Channel Tunnel study group investigations into the feasibility of a Channel Tunnel, which eventually resulted in the tunnel's construction in 1988–94. From 1966 to 1967 Harding was also a member of the Aberfan disaster tribunal, chaired by Lord Justice Edmund Davies, which investigated the rotational slip of a slag heap in South Wales which caused 144 deaths. Harding died at Topsham, Devon on 27 March 1986, having been lobbying for a twin-bore tunnel solution for the Channel Tunnel up to the announcement of its go-ahead, just weeks before his death.

== Institutions and awards ==
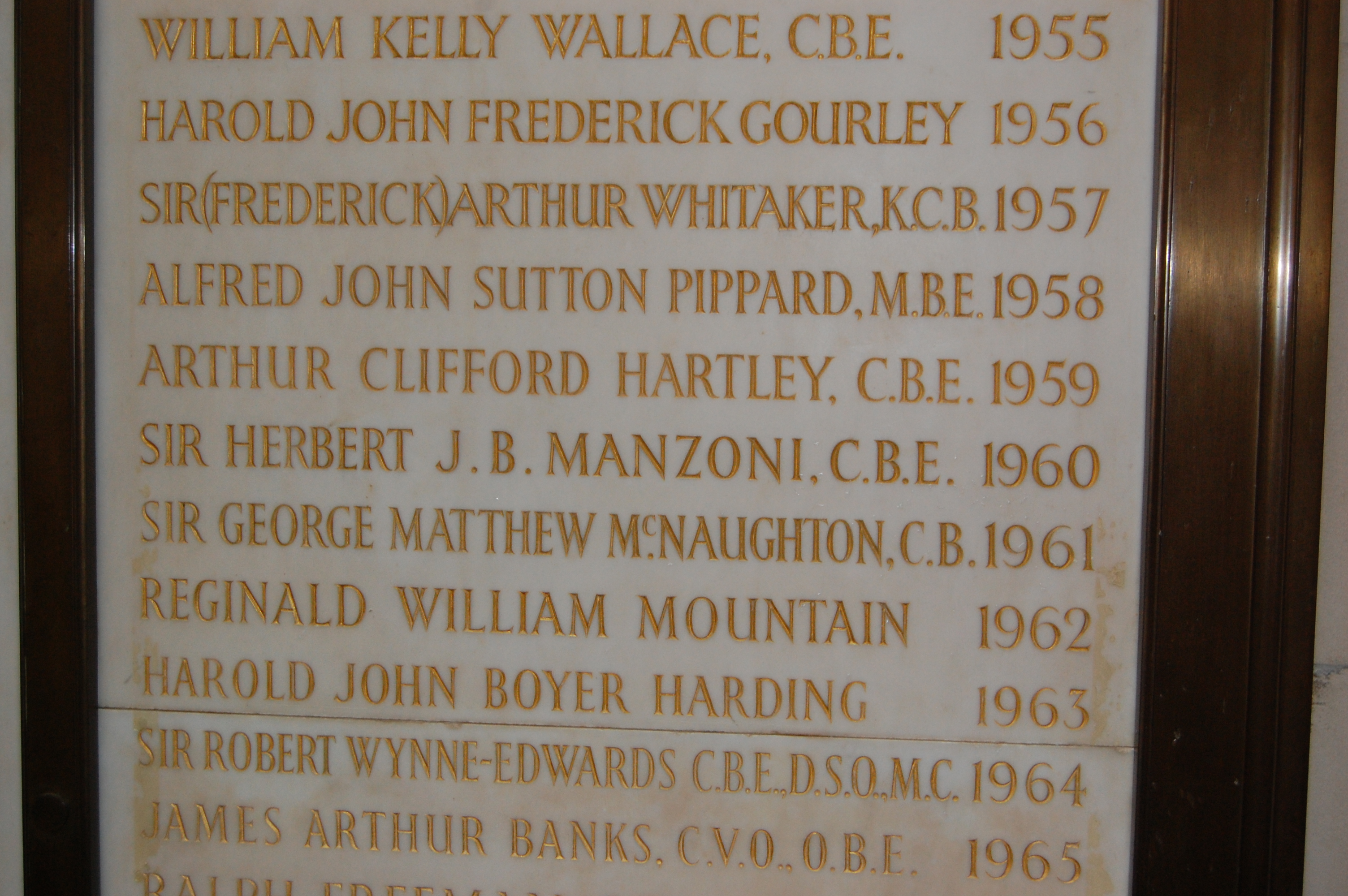
Harding's name on the list of Institution of Civil Engineers presidents, at their One Great George Street headquarters

Harding served as President of the Institution of Civil Engineers from November 1963 to November 1964. He was also the founding chairman of the British Tunnelling Society from 1971 to 1973 and was a founder fellow of the Fellowship of Engineering in 1976. Harding was elected a fellow of the City and Guilds of London Institute in 1952 and of Imperial College in 1968. He also received a knighthood on 13 February 1968 and was awarded an honorary Doctor of Sciences degree from City University London in 1970. Harding served as a governor of three separate academic institutions, Westminster Technical College from 1948 to 1953; Northampton Engineering College from 1950 to 1953, and Imperial College from 1955 to 1975.

== Legacy ==
The National Archives lists some of Harding's professional papers dated 1926–1986 which relate to Piccadilly Circus and the Channel Tunnel. They form part of a donation made by him to the University of Exeter Engineering Department in the early 1980s.

== See also ==
- British Tunnelling Society

Professional and academic associations
Preceded by Reginald William Mountain	President of the Institution of Civil Engineers; November 1963 – November 1964	Succeeded by Robert Wynne-Edwards
