= Central Dredging Association =

- Abbreviation: CEDA
- Formation: 1978
- Type: NGO
- Legal status: Charity
- Purpose: Professional association
- Headquarters: Delft
- Location: The Netherlands
- Region served: Europe, Africa, Middle East
- General Manager: Anna Csiti
- Website: www.dredging.org

The Central Dredging Association (CEDA), founded in 1978, is an independent, non-profit, non-governmental, professional society for the dredging industry. It provides an independent forum for people involved in activities related to dredging and marine construction in Europe, Africa and the Middle-East, and aims to generate and disseminate impartial knowledge and information about dredging in these regions. It is one of three dredging associations that together form the World Organisation of Dredging Associations (WODA).

Its British section is a learned 'Associated Society' of the UK Institution of Civil Engineers.

== History ==
CEDA was launched at the 8th World Dredging Congress in Amsterdam in November 1978. By 2008 its membership (predominantly scientists, academics, engineers and practitioners) had grown to represent over 40 countries.

== Activities ==
CEDA organises events including international conferences, seminars and technical meetings, site visits and training courses; in November 2013, it organised the CEDA Forum in Rotterdam. It also produces publications including conference proceedings with peer-reviewed papers, and provides technical and scientific advice.
