= Hazards Forum =

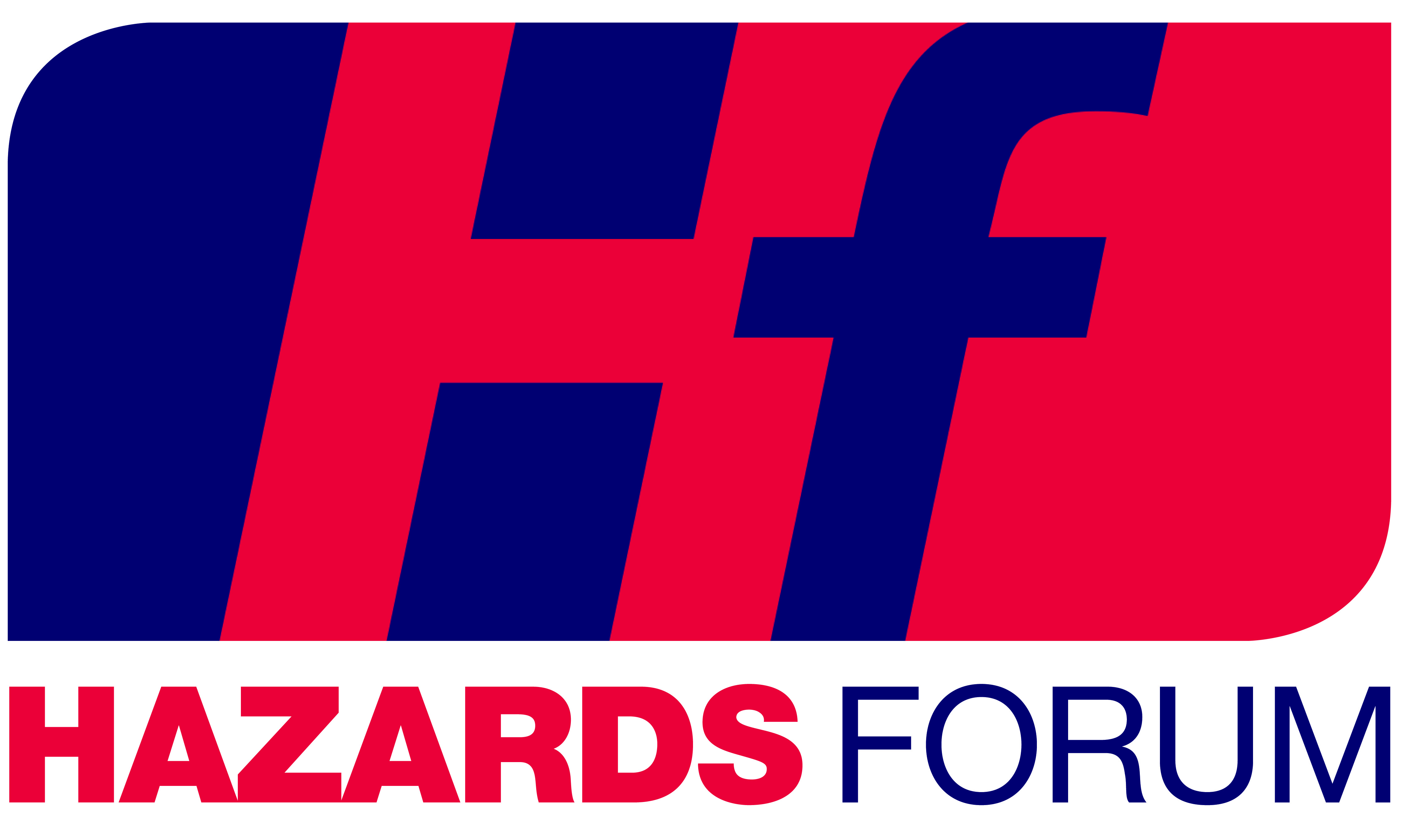
- Hazards Forum logo
- Formation: 1989
- Type: NGO
- Legal status: Registered charity (number 1047047)
- Purpose: Professional association
- Chair: Nick Shaw
- Website: www.hazardsforum.org

The Hazards Forum, founded in 1989, is an independent, non-profit, non-governmental, professional association promoting the study of disasters (and resulting learning), public understanding of risk and of risk reduction strategies. The Hazards Forum was founded by the UK’s four principal engineering institutions: the Institution of Civil Engineers, the Institution of Electrical Engineers, the Institution of Mechanical Engineers and the Institution of Chemical Engineers, and has since welcomed members from other engineering bodies, industry, and the public and charity sectors.

It is also a learned 'Associated Society' of the Institution of Civil Engineers.

== History ==
The Hazards Forum became a registered charity in 1995.

In 1999, former ICE president Stuart Mustow was appointed chairman of the Hazards Forum, replacing Professor Phil Bennett from the Institution of Electrical Engineers. Former chairman Paul Thomas was appointed in July 2010, taking over from Sir David Davies who had been appointed in 2002.

== Activities ==
The Hazard Forum's mission is to enable interdisciplinary learning between professionals for the prevention and mitigation of hazards and disasters. The Hazards Forum's work is mainly focused on the UK. It organises meetings for professional communities, opinion formers and experts, produces education material, and works with other societies and institutions involved with risk issues such as the Royal Society, the Safety and Reliability Society, and the Royal Academy of Engineering.
