= Ronald Binny =

Scottish cricketer and soldier

Personal information
- Full name: Ronald Alexander William Binny
- Born: 20 January 1910; Formby, Lancashire, England
- Died: 24 May 1979 (aged 69); Barnstaple, Devon, England
- Batting: Left-handed
- Bowling: Left-arm fast

Domestic team information
- Years: Team
- 1940/41: Europeans

Career statistics
Competition	First-class
Matches	2
Runs scored	15
Batting average	5.00
100s/50s	–/–
Top score	9
Balls bowled	78
Wickets	0
Bowling average	–
5 wickets in innings	–
10 wickets in match	–
Best bowling	–
Catches/stumpings	1/–
- Source: Cricinfo, 3 November 2023

Ronald Alexander William Binny (20 November 1910 – 24 May 1979) was an English first-class cricketer and an officer in the British Indian Army, and later the Royal Auxiliary Air Force. For much of his life, his first given name was Ranald.

== Life ==
Binny was born prematurely at Formby in November 1910. He was educated at The King's School, Canterbury, before attending the Royal Military College, Sandhurst. Binny graduated from there onto the unattached list of the British Indian Army as a second lieutenant in January 1930. Promotion to lieutenant followed in April 1932, with promotion to captain in August 1938.

Binny fought in the Second World War with the 9th Jat Regiment. From 1942 to 1945 he served with V Force; when in September 1944 Bernard Charles Hamilton Gerty was posted to the 2nd Infantry Division, Binny took over command from him, as Lieutenant-Colonel.

Following the war, Binny was promoted to major in January 1947, before retiring in August of the following year and being granted the rank of colonel. From 1947 to 1954 he was the manager of Dean Park Cricket Ground, and from 1950 he also acted as General Secretary of Hampshire Cricket Club. He joined the Royal Auxiliary Air Force as a flight lieutenant in Aircraft Control Branch in March 1949. He was transferred to the Fighter Control Branch in July of the same year, before joining the reserve in March 1954. Binny died at Barnstaple in May 1979.

== Cricket ==
Binny made his debut in first-class cricket in India for the Roshanara Club against the Viceroy's XI at Delhi in February 1932. He made a second appearance in first-class cricket for the Europeans cricket team against The Rest at Bombay in the final of the 1940–41 Bombay Pentangular. In two first-class appearances, Binny scored 15 runs with a highest score of 9, whilst going wicketless from thirteen overs.
