= Westminster Technical College =

Westminster Technical College was a school in Vincent Square, London SW1. It comprised two schools, a Civil Engineering academy and a Cookery academy.

It was attended by Anthony Hunt, and Katie Stewart. Harold Harding was a School governor at the college. The Who Tour 1965 and The Who Tour 1966 played at the college.
