= William Binnie (engineer) =

British civil engineer (1867–1949)

William James Eames Binnie (10 October 1867 – 4 October 1949) was a British civil engineer. William was the son of Alexander Binnie, the famed civil engineer and William would enter the same career (as, in due course, would his own eldest son). He was educated at Trinity College, Cambridge before completing an apprenticeship with his father's firm. His primary area of work was in hydraulic engineering and he completed works in Britain, Egypt, Nigeria, Singapore, Hong Kong and Burma on reservoirs, dams and hydroelectric power generation.

Binnie was involved in many professional associations and served as president of the Institution of Civil Engineers, Institution of Sanitary Engineers and the Institution of Water Engineers. Binnie was recognised for his work as an engineer by the French government who made him a chevalier of the Legion of Honour in 1948.

== Early life ==
William was born in Derry, Ireland and was the eldest son of Alexander Binnie, the famous civil engineer. He was educated at Bradford Grammar School followed by Rugby School, of which he said "a worse school for a boy who ultimately hoped to follow in his father's footsteps as a civil engineer could hardly have been chosen". He received a degree in the natural sciences tripos from Trinity College, Cambridge in 1888 before spending a year studying Chemistry and Civil Engineering at the University of Karlsruhe in Germany.

== Apprenticeship ==
Binnie was apprenticed to his father, who was then working as a waterworks engineer in Bradford, and also worked on the Lancashire, Derbyshire and East Coast Railway and as an assistant engineer on the Elan Valley Reservoirs. In 1896 he worked with Sir Benjamin Baker on a section of the underground Central London Railway between Shepherd's Bush and Marble Arch as a designer and resident engineer. He worked on docks in Alexandria, Egypt from 1900 to 1902.

== Partnership ==
Having finished his training in 1902, Binnie joined his father's engineering practice working primarily in water supply and hydro-electric power. He was made a partner of the firm in 1904 and a senior partner upon his father's death in 1917. His work included projects in Birkenhead, Belfast, Oxford, Kano, Singapore and Rangoon. Binnie served as the technical advisor to the British representative on the Central Commission for Navigation on the Rhine in 1922; as a member of the Great Ouse Drainage Commission in 1925 and of the Doncaster Area Drainage Commission in 1926. He worked on several projects involved with the River Nile in Egypt, acting as a commissioner for the heightening of the Aswan Dam during 1928 and advising on hydro-electric power generation possibilities on the river in 1937.

Binnie was known for his extensive travels to see projects first hand. In 1940, at the age of 72, he travelled to Hong Kong to advise on a dam and reservoir project. During his return flight to France on a French airliner, France was overrun by German forces and the pilot diverted to Algiers to disembark the passengers. Left without any means of transport in an unfamiliar country that was soon to become hostile, Binnie was forced to work for his passage home. He signed on as an assistant to a Chinese cook aboard a collier bound for Gibraltar whose Turkish crew had mutinied and left the ship shorthanded. He eventually returned safely to Britain where he saw out the rest of the Second World War.

== Professional institutions and honours ==
Binnie first entered the Institution of Civil Engineers (ICE) as an associate member in 1892, becoming a full member in 1900 and serving as chairman of the ICE's committee on flooding in 1933. He was elected president of the ICE for the 1938-9 session, following in the footsteps of his father who was president for 1905–6. Binnie was also elected as president of the Institution of Sanitary Engineers in 1917 and of the Institution of Water Engineers in 1921. He served as chairman of the British sub-committee of the International Committee on Large Dams from 1933 to 1946. Binnie was also made an honorary member of the American Society of Civil Engineers and of the New England Waterworks Association. He was rewarded for his contributions to engineer by the French government by being made a chevalier (knight) of the Legion of Honour in 1948, yet was not honoured in any way by the British government.

== Personal life ==
Binnie married Ethel Morse in 1900 with whom he had three sons. His eldest son, Geoffrey Morse Binnie was born on 13 November 1901 and would become a partner in his father's engineering practice. The elder Binnie retired to Tilehurst, Berkshire, where he died on 4 October 1949, his wife having predeceased him by two years.

The Binnie & Partners engineering company continued practising in hydraulic engineering, merged with Black & Veatch in 1995 and was resurrected as a brand following acquisition by RSK Group in December 2020.

Professional and academic associations
Preceded by Sydney Donkin	President of the Institution of Civil Engineers; November 1938 – November 1939	Succeeded by Clement Hindley
