= Subsurface utilities =

Subsurface Utilities are the utility networks generally laid under the ground surface. These utilities include pipeline networks for water supply, sewage disposal, petrochemical liquid transmission, petrochemical gas transmission or cable networks for power transmission, telecom data transmission, any other data or signal transmission. In North America alone, there are an estimated 35 million miles of subsurface infrastructure that deliver critical services to homes and businesses.

The field of engineering dealing with the locating and mapping subsurface utilities is termed as Subsurface Utility Engineering (SUE).
