= International Tunneling and Underground Space Association =

Non-governmental organization

ITA-AITES
- International Tunneling and Underground Space Association (ITA) / Association Internationale Des Tunnels Et De L Espace Souterrain (AITES)
- ITA-AITES logo
- Formation: 1974
- Type: Nonprofit, NGO
- Purpose: To encourage the use of the subsurface
- Location: Châtelaine, Switzerland
- Members: 80 countries and 266 corporate or individual affiliate members
- Official language: English
- Executive Director: Helen Roth
- Secretariat: Sona Reale
- Website: www.ita-aites.org -->

The International Tunnelling and Underground Space Association (ITA-AITES) is a non-governmental, non-profit organization founded in 1974, comprising currently 80 member nations and 266 corporate or individual affiliate members, aiming to encourage the use of the subsurface for the benefit of public, environment and sustainable development, and to promote advances in planning, design, construction, maintenance and safety of tunnels and underground space. The organization is made up of a community of professionals very involved in the tunnels and underground space industry: engineers, building owners, urban planners, architects, industrial designers, companies specialized in public works and major works, suppliers of construction equipment and materials, lawyers, political representatives, researchers and academics, economists, finance experts, and other stakeholders.

Since 1987, ITA has got the Special Consultative Status with ECOSOC, the Economic and Social Council of the United Nations. It has been involved in Habitat II, studies for crossing of the Gibraltar Strait, reduction of poverty program, World Urban Forum.

The General Assembly is host by a Member Nation at the occasion of the yearly World Tunnel Congress.

ITA has four committees: Committee on operational safety of underground facilities, committee for education and training, committee on underground space (ITACUS) and committee on new technology (ITAtech). Officially created in 2014, the ITA Young Members Group (ITAym) is currently present within more than 20 Member Nations.

== Working groups ==
ITA has a total of 15 Active Working Groups:

- Working group 2: Research
- Working group 3: Contractual Practices
- Working group 5: Health and Safety in Works
- Working group 6: Maintenance and Repair
- Working group 9: Seismic Effects
- Working group 11: Immersed and Floating Tunnels
- Working group 12: Sprayed Concrete Use
- Working group 14: Mechanized Tunnelling
- Working group 15: Underground and Environment
- Working group 17: Long Tunnels at Great Depth
- Working group 19: Conventional Tunnelling
- Working group 20: Urban Problems, Underground Solutions
- Working group 21: Life Cycle Asset Management
- Working group 22: Information Modelling in Tunnelling
- Working group 23: Design & Construction of Shafts

== ITA Tunnelling awards ==
Since 2015, the international competition "the ITA Tunnelling and Underground Space Awards" seeks and rewards the most ground-breaking innovation and outstanding projects in tunnelling and underground construction. With 8 categories, this competition aims to identify the most important ongoing underground works and technologies that help cities change and enable habits and ways of life to evolve in order to build smart and sustainable urban areas.

The first edition was held in charming and fascinating Hagerbach test gallery in Switzerland in July 2015. After the successful launch in 2015, with 110 nominations and 11 awards for projects and personalities, the second program for the ITA Tunneling Awards was held in Singapore Nov. 10–11, 2016 and supported by the TUCSS - Tunnelling and Underground Construction Society, Singapore, with 98 nominations from 25 countries competing for awards in nine categories. The 2017 edition took place on the 15th of November 2017, in Paris during the AFTES 15th International Congress from 13 to 16 November 2017. The 2018 edition took place in Chuzhou, China, Nov. 7 2018. The 2019 edition took place in Miami, in conjunction with Cutting Edge Conference of UCA of SME. The 2020 and 2021 editions ware held virtually due to the Covid Pandemic.

== ITA COSUF ==
ITA COSUF is the Centre of Excellence for world-wide exchange of information and know-how regarding operational safety and security of underground facilities. its objectives are to develop and maintain a network to exchange knowledge and to facilitate the creation of dedicated teams and groups to perform specific (research or other) activities, promote safety and security by fostering innovation and by supporting the development of improved regulations and standards regarding safety and security of underground facilities in operation.

It currently has four Activities Groups:

- Activity Group 1: Interaction with European & International activities
- Activity Group 2: Regulations & Best Practice
- Activity Group 3: Research & New Findings
- Activity Group 4: Road Tunnel Safety Officers

== ITA-CET ==
Since 2000, ITA, the International Tunnelling and Underground Space Association has identified education and training as one of its main strategic goals. Due to the boom in the tunnelling and underground space industry, there is a growing demand for the training of students and professionals in this field. In 2007, in order to promote and assist in the coordination of education and training in the tunnelling and underground space industry, ITA decided to create a Committee on Education and Training (the ITA-CET Committee).

To date (April 2020), over 8,500 professionals around the globe have attended over 80 training sessions organized by the ITACET Foundation in relation with the ITA-CET Committee.

== ITACUS ==
ITACUS is one of four permanent committees of the International Tunnelling and Underground Space Association, with the mandate to reach out to policy leaders, NGOs and interrelated disciplines. ITACUS presents at worldwide congresses, seminar and workshops to create awareness of the undergrounds potential but also to foster the integration into the urban fabric through planning and applied uses. The Next Level Up is Down is the core of ITACUS vision and strategy. As cities have grown denser, it seemed only natural to extend skywards. However, the sky is not the limit: Cities need to start looking downwards to adapt to new circumstances and reach the next level of existence

ITACUS has published 'Think Deep: Planning, development and use of underground space in cities', a book containing five case studies by planners on underground space.

== ITAtech ==
The aim of ITAtech is to provide a platform for engineers, manufacturers, contractors and suppliers to draw global experience and expertise together for the benefit of the whole industry, and to find ways of supporting the introduction of new techniques and products by collaborating on the development of design and performance criteria and preparing application of best-practice guidelines.

The ITAtech activity groups (AG) include all processes related to underground construction such as Data Management, Excavation, Linning, Support &Waterproofing and Design.

In 2022, ITAtech launched 'Low Carbon Linings' Activity Group" on low carbon concrete linings for shafts and tunnels.

It currently has 3 Active Groups and 7 Sub-Activity groups.

- Activity Group 1: Low Carbon, launched in 2022
- Activity Group 2: Excavation
- Activity Group 3: Lining, Support & Waterproofing
