= Binay =

Binay is a surname. Notable people with the surname include the members of the influential Binay Family of Makati:

- Abigail Binay (born 1975), Filipino politician, former 2nd district representative and former mayor of Makati
- Elenita Binay (born 1943), Filipino politician and wife of Jejomar Binay; former mayor of Makati
- Jejomar Binay (born 1942), Filipino politician, former Mayor of Makati, and former Vice President of the Philippines
- Jejomar Binay Jr. (born 1977), Filipino politician and former mayor of Makati
- Nancy Binay (born 1973), Filipino politician, former senator of the Philippines, and current Mayor of Makati

== See also ==
- Binay, a barangay in Palapag, Philippines
- Mete Binay (born 1985), Turkish weightlifter
