= Alexander Binnie =

British civil engineer

- Born: 26 March 1839; St George Hanover Square, London
- Died: 18 May 1917 (aged 78)
- Engineering career
- Discipline: Civil
- Institutions: Institution of Civil Engineers (president)
- Projects: Blackwall Tunnel, Greenwich foot tunnel, Vauxhall Bridge
- Awards: Telford Medal

Sir Alexander Richardson Binnie (26 March 1839 – 18 May 1917) was a British civil engineer responsible for several major engineering projects, including several associated with crossings of the River Thames in London.

He was born in London to a Scottish father, Alexander Binnie, and Hannah Carr from Castle Sowerby, Cumberland. He was baptised at the Swallow Street Scotch Church, where his grandfather Alexander Birnie was an elder. He trained as an engineer by being articled in 1858 to Terence Flannagan and afterwards to Frederic la Trobe Bateman. He then worked on railways in mid-Wales before moving in 1868 to India to engineer the Nagpur water supply system. He received the Telford Medal of the Institution of Civil Engineers in 1875 for his paper on the Nagpur waterworks.

In 1875, he returned to England as Chief Engineer for Waterworks for the City of Bradford, West Yorkshire where he was concerned with the repair and construction of reservoirs and large water supply projects, such as Upper Barden Reservoir. He was then offered the post of Chief Engineer for London County Council in 1890, a post he held until 1902.

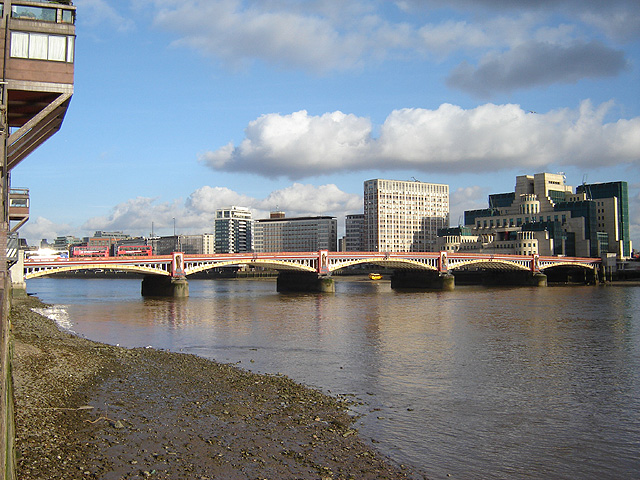
Binnie's Vauxhall Bridge

As chief engineer for London County Council, his design feats included the first Blackwall Tunnel (1897) and Greenwich foot tunnel (1902) (both in Greenwich, London) and, further upstream, Vauxhall Bridge (1906).

He was knighted in 1897 by Queen Victoria for services to engineering and elected President of the Institution of Civil Engineers in 1905.

He also designed, with Sir Benjamin Baker, major parts of London's drainage system, including east London sewage treatment works at Crossness and Beckton on the south and north sides of the Thames respectively (these were sited at the ends of the sewer outfalls created by Sir Joseph Bazalgette during the late 19th century).

== Legacy ==
Like several other notable engineers of the late 19th and early 20th centuries (e.g. Sir William Halcrow, Sir Alexander Gibb), Binnie founded a firm under his name, which his son William took over on his father's retirement. In 1909, Sir Alexander Binnie and Son merged with another engineering consultancy to become Sir Alexander Binnie, Son & Deacon; later it became Binnie & Partners, and from the 1990s it was part of the multi-national Black & Veatch consultancy. In January 2021, the Europe and Asian water businesses of Black & Veatch were acquired by RSK Group and renamed Binnies.

== Personal life ==
Binnie married, in 1865, Mary Frances Eames, the daughter of Dr. William J. Eames, of Londonderry. Lady Binnie died in London 21 September 1901.

Professional and academic associations
Preceded by Guilford Lindsey Molesworth	President of the Institution of Civil Engineers; November 1905 – November 1906	Succeeded by Alexander Kennedy
