= Institution of Civil Engineers =

UK independent professional association

- Logo
- Abbreviation: ICE
- Formation: 2 January 1818; 208 years ago
- Type: Civil engineering professional association
- Professional title: Chartered Civil Engineer
- Headquarters: One Great George Street; London, SW1
- Region served: Worldwide
- Fields: Civil engineering
- Members: 5,191 Fellows; 39,507 Members; 95,460 all grades (as of December 2022) (2020)
- President: Julie Wood
- Director General: Janet Young
- Subsidiaries: Thomas Telford Ltd
- Website: www.ice.org.uk

The Institution of Civil Engineers (ICE) is an independent professional association and learned society for civil engineers and a charitable body in the United Kingdom. Based in London, the ICE has over 92,000 members, of whom three-quarters are located in the UK, while the rest are located in more than 150 other countries. The ICE aims to support the civil engineering profession by offering professional qualification, promoting education, maintaining professional ethics, and liaising with industry, academia and government. Under its commercial arm, it delivers training, recruitment, publishing and contract services. As a professional body, the ICE aims to support and promote professional learning (both to students and existing practitioners), managing professional ethics and safeguarding the status of engineers, and representing the interests of the profession in dealings with government, etc. It sets standards for membership of the body; works with industry and academia to progress engineering standards and advises on education and training curricula.

== History ==
Window at ICE headquarters commemorating its founding

The late 18th century and early 19th century saw the founding of many learned societies and professional bodies (for example, the Royal Society and the Law Society). Groups calling themselves civil engineers had been meeting for some years from the late 18th century, notably the Society of Civil Engineers formed in 1771 by John Smeaton (renamed the Smeatonian Society after his death). At that time, formal engineering in Britain was limited to the military engineers of the Corps of Royal Engineers, and in the spirit of self-help prevalent at the time and to provide a focus for the fledgling 'civilian engineers', the Institution of Civil Engineers was founded as the world's first professional engineering body.

The initiative to found the Institution was taken in 1818 by eight young engineers, Henry Robinson Palmer (23), William Maudslay (23), Thomas Maudslay (26), James Jones (28), Charles Collinge (26), John Lethbridge, James Ashwell (19) and Joshua Field (32), who held an inaugural meeting on 2 January 1818, at the Kendal Coffee House in Fleet Street. The institution made little headway until a key step was taken – the appointment of Thomas Telford as the first President of the body. Greatly respected within the profession and blessed with numerous contacts across the industry and in government circles, he was instrumental in drumming up membership and getting a royal charter for the ICE in 1828. This official recognition helped establish the ICE as the pre-eminent organisation for engineers of all disciplines.

Early definitions of a Civil Engineer can be found in the discussions held on 2 January 1818 and in the application for Royal Chartership. In 1818 Palmer said that:

An Engineer is a mediator between the Philosopher and the working Mechanic; and like an interpreter between two foreigners must understand the language of both. The Philosopher searches into Nature and discovers her laws, and promulgates the principles and adapts them to our circumstances. The working Mechanic, governed by the superintendence of the Engineer, brings his ideas into reality. Hence the absolute necessity of possessing both practical and theoretical knowledge.

When the time came to apply for a Charter it was clearly necessary to define the profession ... the council applied to Thomas Tredgold to propose some suitable description. The result was the now well-known definition of Civil Engineering as "the art of directing the great sources of power in Nature for the use and convenience of man," and this was embodied in the Charter.

The objects of such institution, as recited in the charter, and reported in The Times, were

The general advancement of mechanical science, and more particularly for promoting the acquisition of that species of knowledge which constitutes the profession of a civil engineer; being the art of directing the great sources of power in nature for the use and convenience of man, as the means of production and of traffic in states, both for external and internal trade, as applied in the construction of roads, bridges, aqueducts, canals, river navigation, and docks, for internal intercourse and exchange; and in the construction of ports, harbours, moles, breakwaters, and light-houses, and in the art of navigation by artificial power, for the purposes of commerce; and in the construction and adaptation of machinery, and in the drainage of cities and towns.

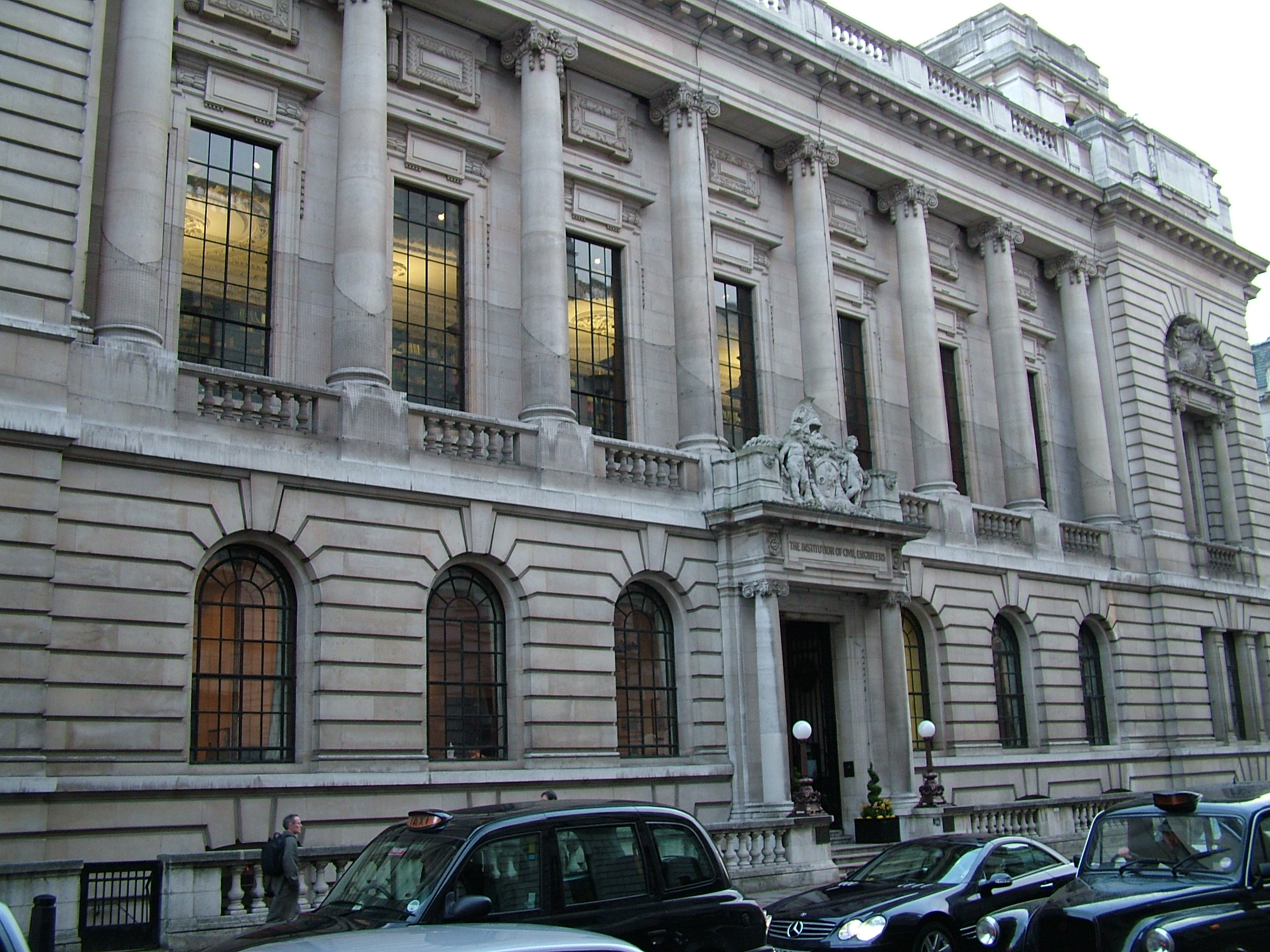
The Institution's headquarters at One Great George Street in London

After Telford's death in 1834, the organisation moved into premises in Great George Street in the heart of Westminster in 1839, and began to publish learned papers on engineering topics. Its members, notably William Cubitt, were also prominent in the organisation of the Great Exhibition of 1851.

For 29 years the ICE provided the forum for engineers practising in all the disciplines recognised today. Mechanical engineer and tool-maker Henry Maudslay was an early member and Joseph Whitworth presented one of the earliest papers – it was not until 1847 that the Institution of Mechanical Engineers was established (with George Stephenson as its first President).

By the end of the 19th century, the ICE had introduced examinations for professional engineering qualifications to help ensure and maintain high standards among its members – a role it continues today.

The ICE's Great George Street headquarters, designed by James Miller, was built by John Mowlem & Co and completed in 1911.

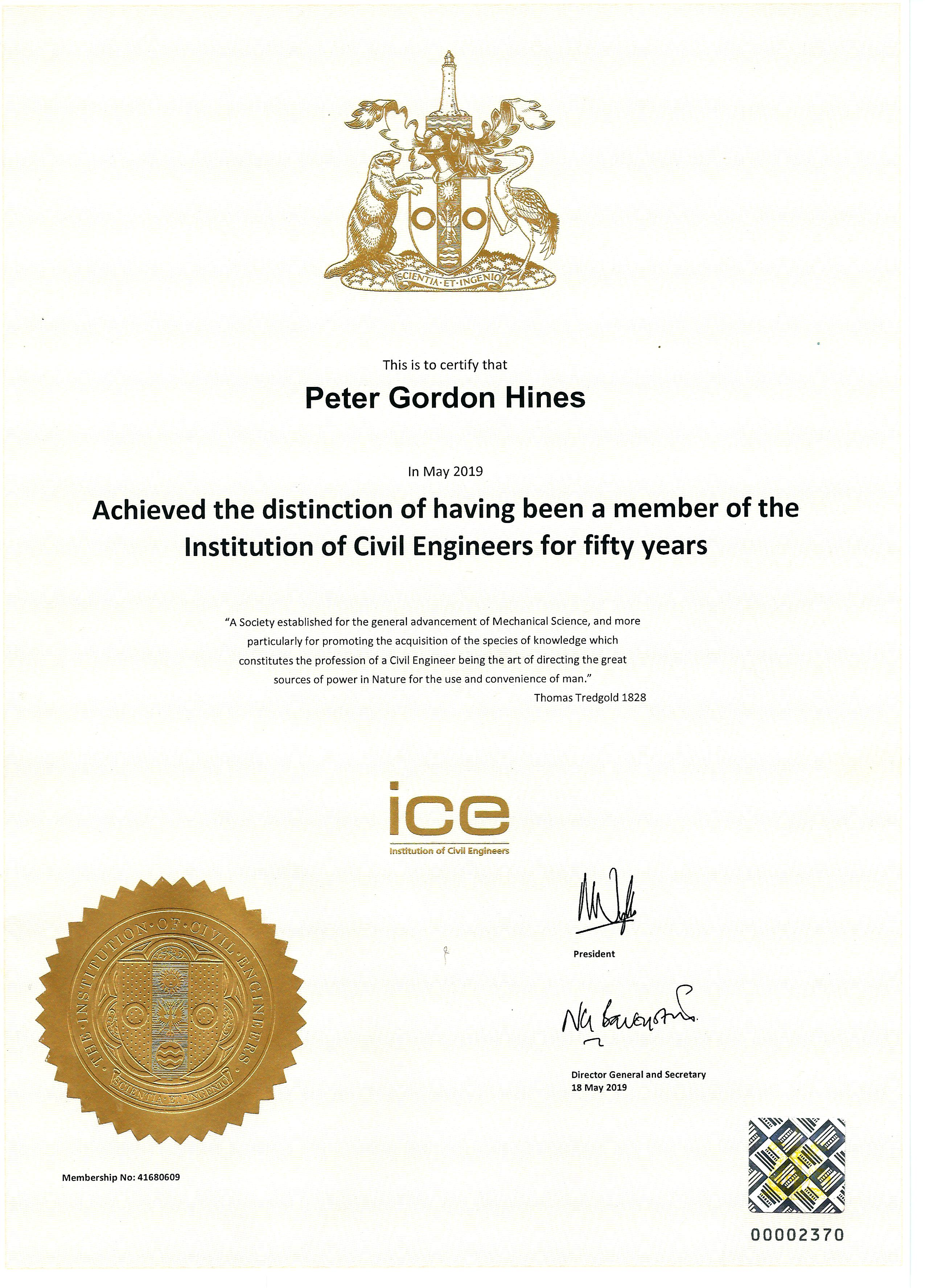
A 50 year-membership certificate

=== Membership and professional qualification ===
The institution is a membership organisation comprising 95,460 members worldwide (as of 31 December 2022); around three-quarters are located in the United Kingdom. Membership grades include:

- Student
- Graduate (GMICE)
- Associate (AMICE)
- Technician (MICE)
- Member (MICE)
- Fellow (FICE)

The ICE is a licensed body of the Engineering Council and can award the Chartered Engineer (CEng), Incorporated Engineer (IEng) and Engineering Technician (EngTech) professional qualifications. Members who are Chartered Engineers can use the protected title Chartered Civil Engineer.

The ICE is also licensed by the Society for the Environment to award the Chartered Environmentalist (CEnv) professional qualification.

=== Publishing ===
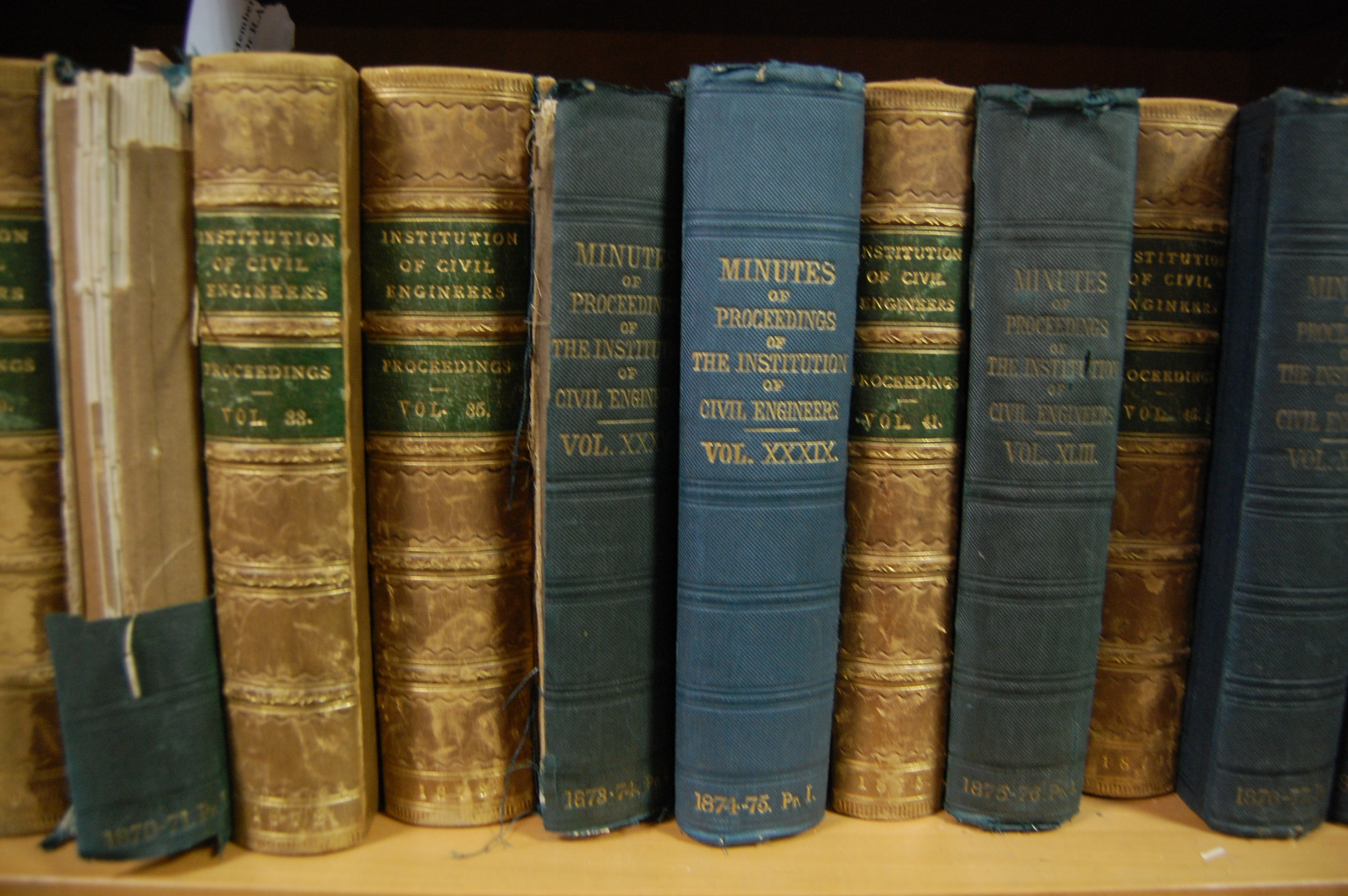
Copies of the Proceedings of the ICE in the Great George Street library

The Institution of Civil Engineers also publishes technical studies covering research and best practice in civil engineering. Under its commercial arm, Thomas Telford Ltd, it delivers training, recruitment, publishing and contract services, such as the NEC Engineering and Construction Contract. All the profits of Thomas Telford Ltd go back to the Institution to further its stated aim of putting civil engineers at the heart of society. The publishing division has existed since 1836 and is today called ICE Publishing. ICE Publishing produces roughly 30 books a year, including the ICE Manuals series, and 30 civil engineering journals, including the ICE Proceedings in nineteen parts, Géotechnique, and the Magazine of Concrete Research. The ICE Science series is now also published by ICE Publishing. ICE Science currently consists of five journals: Nanomaterials and Energy, Emerging Materials Research, Bioinspired, Biomimetic and Nanobiomaterials, Green Materials and Surface Innovations. Nineteen individual parts now make up the Proceedings, as follows:

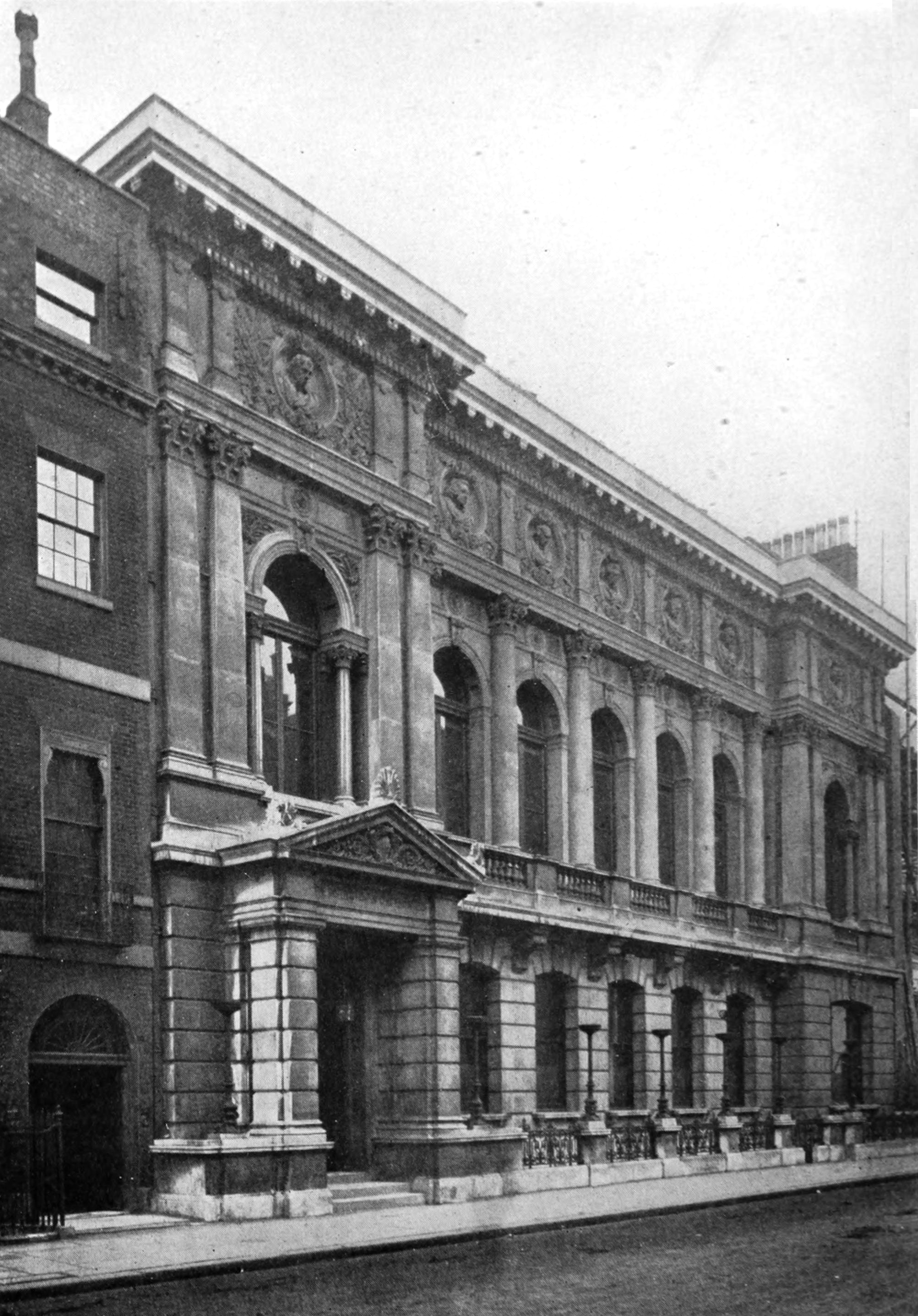
- The 1895 headquarters on Great George, designed by Charles Barry Jr. After its demolition in 1910 to make way for Government Offices Great George Street, the Institution moved to the other side of the street.
  Proceedings of the Institution of Civil Engineers: Bridge Engineering
- Proceedings of the Institution of Civil Engineers: Civil Engineering
- Proceedings of the Institution of Civil Engineers: Construction Materials
- Proceedings of the Institution of Civil Engineers: Energy
- Proceedings of the Institution of Civil Engineers: Engineering and Computational Mechanics
- Proceedings of the Institution of Civil Engineers: Engineering History and Heritage
- Proceedings of the Institution of Civil Engineers: Engineering Sustainability
- Proceedings of the Institution of Civil Engineers: Forensic Engineering
- Proceedings of the Institution of Civil Engineers: Geotechnical Engineering
- Proceedings of the Institution of Civil Engineers: Ground Improvement
- Proceedings of the Institution of Civil Engineers: Management, Procurement and Law
- Proceedings of the Institution of Civil Engineers: Maritime Engineering
- Proceedings of the Institution of Civil Engineers: Municipal Engineer
- Proceedings of the Institution of Civil Engineers: Smart Infrastructure and Construction
- Proceedings of the Institution of Civil Engineers: Structures and Buildings
- Proceedings of the Institution of Civil Engineers: Transport
- Proceedings of the Institution of Civil Engineers: Urban Design and Planning
- Proceedings of the Institution of Civil Engineers: Waste and Resource Management
- Proceedings of the Institution of Civil Engineers: Water Management

ICE members, except for students, also receive the New Civil Engineer magazine (published weekly from 1995 to 2017 by Emap, now published monthly by Metropolis International).

=== Specialist Knowledge Societies ===
The ICE also administers 15 Specialist Knowledge Societies created at different times to support special interest groups within the civil engineering industry, some of which are British sections of international and/or European bodies. The societies provide continuing professional development and assist in the transfer of knowledge concerning specialist areas of engineering.

The Specialist Knowledge Societies are:

- British Dam Society
- British Geotechnical Association
- British Hydrological Society
- British Tunnelling Society
- Central Dredging Association
- Hazards Forum
- Ingenieurs et Scientifiques de France: British Section
- Temporary Works Forum
- Irrigation and Water Forum
- Offshore Engineering Society
- The International Navigation Association: UK section
- Railway Civil Engineers' Association
- Society for Earthquake and Civil Engineering Dynamics
- Transport Planning Society
- UK Wind Engineering Society

== Governance ==
The institution is governed by the ICE Trustee Board, comprising the President, three Vice Presidents, four members elected from the membership, three ICE Council members, and one nominated member. The President is the public face of the institution and day-to-day management is the responsibility of the Director General.

=== President ===
The ICE President is elected annually and the holder for 2026–2027 is Julie Wood.

Each year a number of young engineers have been chosen as President's apprentices. The scheme was started in 2005 during the presidency of Gordon Masterton, who also initiated a President's blog, now the ICE Infrastructure blog. Each incoming President sets out the main theme of their year of office in a Presidential Address.

Many of the profession's greatest engineers have served as President of the ICE including:

- Thomas Telford (1820–1834 – the post later became a biennial and then annual accolade)
- James Walker (1835–45)
- Sir John Rennie (1845–48)
- Sir William Cubitt (1849–1851)
- James Meadows Rendel (1852–53)
- Robert Stephenson (1855–57)
- Joseph Locke (1857–59)
- John Robinson McClean (1864–65)
- Sir John Fowler (1867)
- Thomas Hawksley (1873)
- William Henry Barlow (1880–82)
- Sir Joseph Bazalgette (1882–84)
- Sir John Wolfe-Barry (1898)
- Sir Alexander Binnie (1906)
- Sir Basil Mott (1925)
- Sir Alexander Gibb (1937)
- Sir William Halcrow (1946–47)

One of Britain's greatest engineers, Isambard Kingdom Brunel died before he could take up the post (he was vice-president from 1850).

== Female civil engineers ==
The first woman member of the ICE was Dorothy Donaldson Buchanan in 1927. The first female Fellows elected were Molly Fergusson (1957), Marie Lindley (1972), Helen Stone (1991) and Joanna Kennedy (1992). In May 2025 27-year-old Transport for London engineer Jane Wright became the youngest woman to be elected a Fellow of the ICE. She is likely the youngest person to be elected a Fellow of the ICE within the limitations of available records.

The four women Presidents (to date) are Jean Venables, who became the 144th holder of the office in 2008, Rachel Skinner, who became President in 2020, Anusha Shah, the President in 2023 and the 2026-2027 President Julie Wood.

In January 1969 the Council of the Institution set up a working party to consider the role of women in engineering. Among its conclusions were that 'while women have certainly established their competence throughout the professional engineering field, there is clearly a built-in or unconscious prejudice against them'. The WISE Campaign (Women into Science and Engineering) was launched in 1984; by 1992 3% of the total ICE membership of 79,000 was female, and only 0.8% of chartered civil engineers were women. By 2016 women comprised nearly 12% of total membership, almost 7% of chartered civil engineers and just over 2% of Fellows. In June 2015 a Presidential Commission on diversity was announced. By the start of 2023 women made up 16% of overall membership, with female fellows comprising 6% of the fellowship. In 2026 the 500th woman Fellow was elected and the proportion of women in that grade had reached almost 10%.

== Awards ==
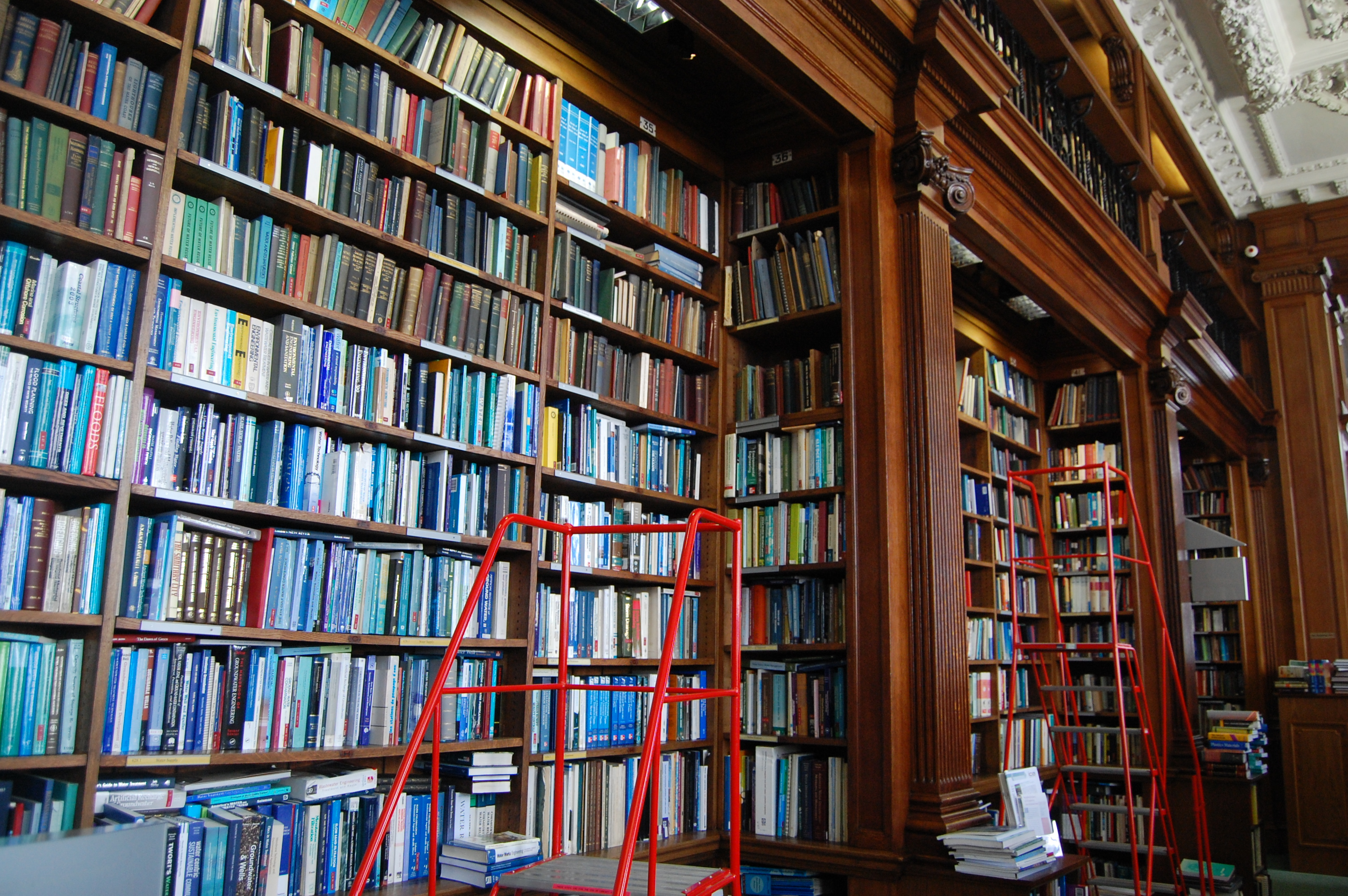
The ICE library at One Great George Street

The Institution makes various awards to recognise the work of its members. In addition to awards for technical papers, reports and competition entries it awards medals for different achievements.

- Gold Medal – The Gold Medal is awarded to an individual who has made valuable contributions to civil engineering over many years. This may cover contributions in one or more areas, such as, design, research, development, investigation, construction, management (including project management), education and training.
- Garth Watson Medal – The Garth Watson Medal is awarded for dedicated and valuable service to the ICE by an ICE Member or member of staff.
- Brunel Medal – The Brunel Medal is awarded to teams, individuals or organisations operating within the built environment and recognises excellence in civil engineering.
- Edmund Hambly Medal – The Edmund Hambly Medal awarded for creative design in an engineering project that makes a substantial contribution to sustainable development. It is awarded to projects, of any scale, which take into account such factors as full life-cycle effects, including de-commissioning, and show an understanding of the implications of infrastructure impact upon the environment. The medal is awarded in honour of past president Edmund Hambly who was a proponent of sustainable engineering.
- International Medal – The International Medal is awarded annually to a civil engineer who has made an outstanding contribution to civil engineering outside the United Kingdom or an engineer who resides outside the United Kingdom.
- Warren Medal – The Warren Medal is awarded annually to an ICE member in recognition of valuable services to their region.
- Telford Medal – Telford Medal is the highest prize that can be awarded by the ICE for a paper.
- James Alfred Ewing Medal – The James Alfred Ewing Medal is awarded by the council on the joint nomination of the president and the President of the Royal Society.
- James Forrest Medal – The James Forrest Medal was established in honour of James Forrest upon his retirement as secretary in 1896.
- Baker Medal – The Baker Medal was established in 1934 to recognise papers that promote or cover developments in engineering practice, or investigation into problems with which Sir Benjamin Baker was specially identified.
- Jean Venables Medal – Since 2011, the Institution has awarded a Jean Venables Medal to its best Technician Professional Review candidate.
- President's Medal
- Emerging Engineer Award
- James Rennie Medal – For the best Chartered Professional Review candidate of the year. Named after James Rennie, a civil engineer noted for his devotion to the training of new engineers.
- Renée Redfern Hunt Memorial Prize – For the best chartered or member professional review written exercise of the year. Named for an ICE staff member who served as examinations officer from 1945 to 1981.
- Tony Chapman Medal – For the best member professional review candidate of the year. Named after an ICE council member who played a key role in the integration of the Board of Incorporated Engineers and Technicians into the institution and in promoting incorporated engineer status.
- Chris Binnie Award for Sustainable Water Management
- The Bev Waugh Award – Since 2021, for productivity and culture, recognises a leader or individual who has had a positive impact on joint team working
- Adrian Long Medal

== Student chapters ==
The ICE has student chapters in several countries including Hong Kong, India, Indonesia, Malaysia, Malta, Pakistan, Poland, Sudan, Trinidad, and United Arab Emirates.

== Arms ==
Coat of arms of Institution of Civil Engineers
| Notes Arms granted 17 March 1913, crest and supporters 31 December 1948 Crest On a wreath of the colours upon a billet fessewise Azure charged with a fesse wavy argent a representation of the Eddystone lighthouse upon rocks Proper. Escutcheon Or on a pale azure between two annulets in fesse Sable a thunderbolt between in chief a sun in splendour of the first and in base a fountain Proper. Supporters On the dexter side a beaver and on the sinister a crane both Proper. |

== See also ==
- Chartered Institution of Civil Engineering Surveyors
- Construction Industry Council
