= Douglas George Sopwith =

Scottish engineer

Douglas George Sopwith CBE FRSE MIME Wh.Sch (1906–1970) was a 20th-century Scottish engineer. From 1951 to 1967 he was Director of the National Engineering Laboratory (UK).

== Life ==
He was born on 13 November 1906, the son of Joseph Sopwith, master mariner. He was educated at Manchester Grammar School. Sopwith gained a Whitworth Scholarship which supported him to study Engineering at the University of Manchester graduating BSc (Tech) in 1928, at the same time becoming a full Whitworth Scholar. He then worked at Manchester Dry Docks.

In 1934 the Institute of Mechanical Engineers awarded Sopwith their Thomas Lowe Gray Prize and in 1948 he won their Bernard Hall Prize.

His alma mater awarded him an honorary doctorate (DSc) in 1948. He then got a job as Superintendent of the Engineering Divisions at the National Physical Laboratory. In 1951 he was appointed Director of the National Engineering Laboratory where he remained for the rest of his career.

In 1957 he was created a Commander of the Order of the British Empire (CBE). In 1963 he was elected a Fellow of the Royal Society of Edinburgh also served as President of the Whitworth Society. His proposers were Jack Allen, Sir Samuel Curran, William Fisher Cassie, and Ronald Arnold.

He retired in 1967 and served as Chairman of the Institute of Mechanical Engineers for the rest of his life.

He died whilst returning from a holiday in England on 22 October 1970.

== Family ==
He was exceedingly shy and never married.
