= Whitworth Building =

Building in Manchester, England

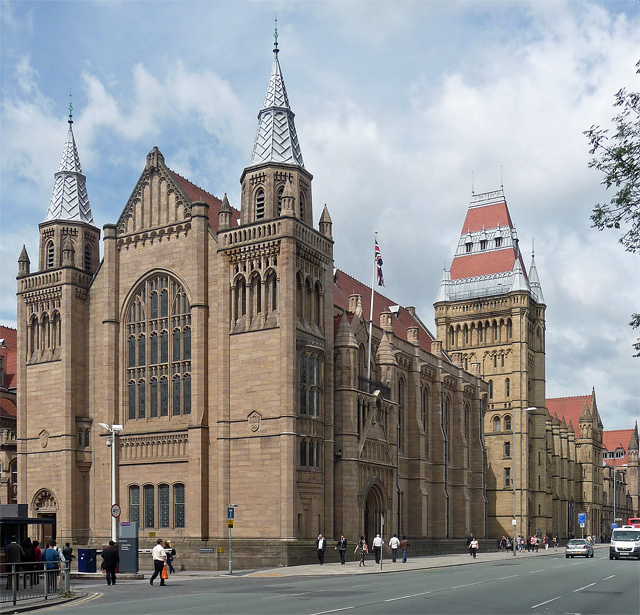
- Whitworth Building from the outside, showing a large stained glass window on its south side which is a prominent feature of the Whitworth Hall

General information
- Architectural style: Neogothic
- Location: Oxford Road, Manchester M13 9PL
- Coordinates: 53°27′55.8″N 2°14′0.6″W
- Completed: c.1895–1902

Design and construction
- Architect: Paul Waterhouse
- Designations

Listed Building – Grade II*
- Official name: Victoria University of Manchester including Christie Library, Whitworth Hall
- Designated: 18 December 1963
- Reference no.: 1271428

The Whitworth Building is a grade II* listed building on Oxford Road and Burlington Street in Chorlton-on-Medlock, Manchester, England. Completed in 1902, the building has been listed since 1963 and is part of the University of Manchester. It lies at the south-east range of the old quadrangle of the university, with the Manchester Museum adjoined to the north, and the former Christie Library connected to the west.

== History ==
The building was constructed c. 1895–1902, in the style of the Gothic Revival, and was designed by Paul Waterhouse. The official opening ceremony took place on 12 March 1902, when the Prince and Princess of Wales (later King George V and Queen Mary) were present. The Whitworth Building is named after the Mancunian industrialist Joseph Whitworth, who donated some of his fortune to fund public developments in Manchester. The legatees, among whom was Richard Copley Christie, funded the construction of the building and the adjoining Christie Library (the library was completed first and opened in 1898).

== Exterior ==
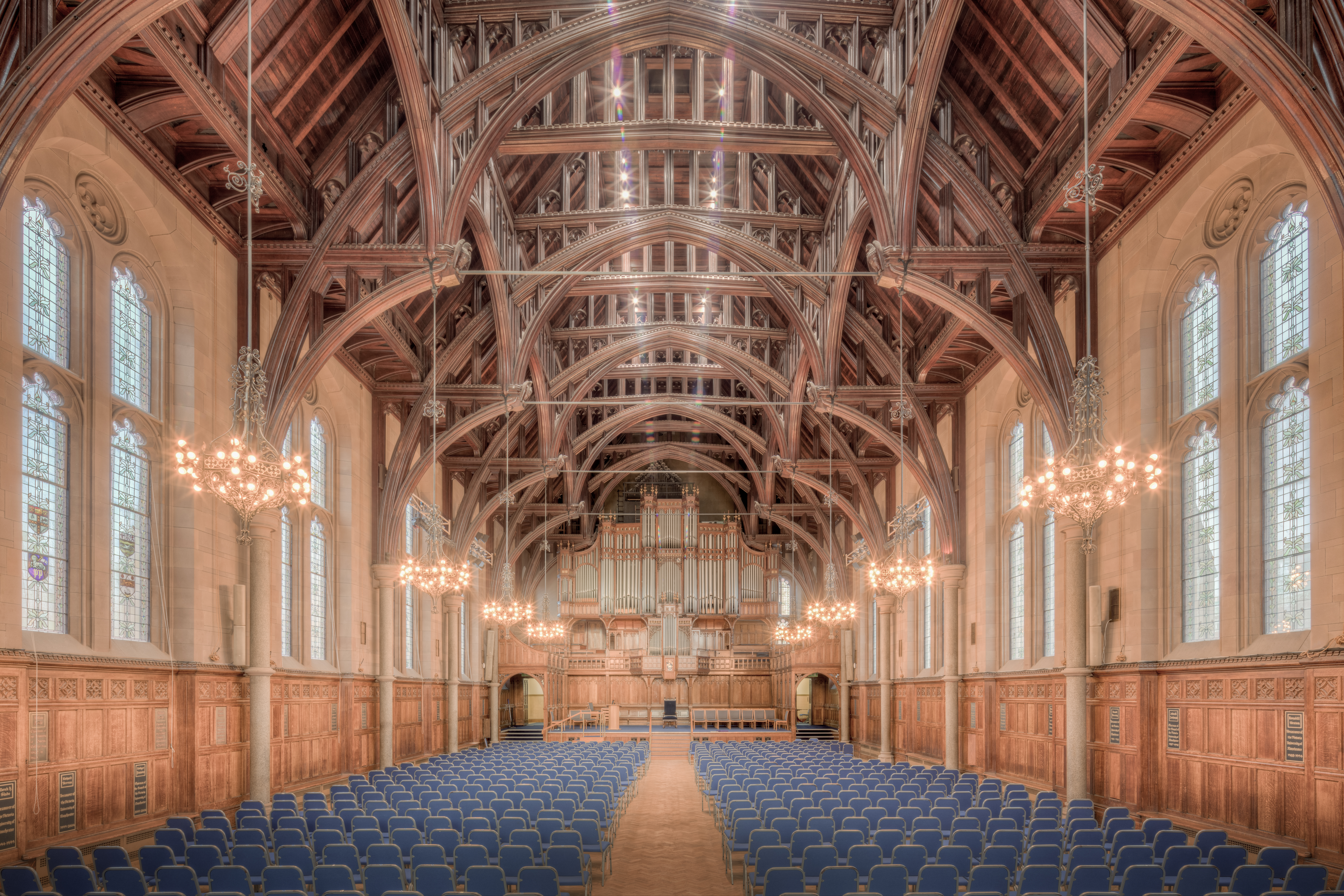
The inside of Whitworth Hall

The building is constructed of sandstone, with red tiled roofs in fish scale bands, and is connected to the Manchester Museum to the north via a 2-storey entrance archway. The building has two unequal storeys, consisting of eight bays separated by buttresses. It has a large perpendicular style stained glass window facing south. Two 3-stage corner towers flank the window, with octagonal belfries and short spires.

== Interior and functions ==
The building's upper floor comprises the Whitworth Hall, which can hold up to 675 people for meetings, up to 300 people for banquets or up to 200 for dinner dances. The interior of the hall is also Gothic in construction and decoration, in keeping with the exterior. It has a hammerbeam roof (unusually the lower timbers spring from freestanding columns), a dais and a large organ occupy the northernmost part of the hall, and raised wooden galleries project from both northern and southern walls. The organ was donated by Enriqueta Rylands in 1902. The hall is licensed for civil weddings, and is used for all graduation ceremonies at the university. The lower floor of the building is of a much less lofty construction, and is separated into a number of meeting rooms, consisting of five boardrooms and a council chamber.
