= Henry Lewis Guy =

British engineer (1887–1956)

Sir Henry Lewis Guy CBE
- Born: 15 June 1887; Penarth, Vale of Glamorgan, Wales
- Died: 20 July 1956 (aged 69); Poole, Dorset, England
- Awards: Fellow of the Royal Society, Whitworth Exhibitioner (1908), IMechE Thomas Hawksley Medal (1927)

Sir Henry Lewis Guy CBE, FRS, (15 June 1887 – 20 July 1956) was a leading British mechanical engineer, notable in particular for his work on steam turbine design.

== Early life ==
Guy was born at Penarth, in the Vale of Glamorgan, Wales in 1887. Following his education he joined the Taff Vale Railway as a student apprentice, and studied at the University College of South Wales where he gained a diploma in mechanical and electrical engineering. Guy was a Whitworth Exhibitioner in 1908

== Career ==
In 1915, Guy joined the British Westinghouse Company, (later to become Metropolitan-Vickers) as a design engineer. In 1918 he was appointed chief mechanical engineer at that company, a post he was to hold until 1941. Whilst at Metrovicks, Guy was responsible for many innovations in the design of steam turbo-generators.

Guy was elected a Fellow of the Royal Society in 1936.

During World War II, Guy served on a number committees including the Scientific Advisory Council of the Ministry of Supply. He was awarded a CBE in 1943 followed by a knighthood in 1949.

From 1941 until his retirement in 1951, Guy was secretary of the Institution of Mechanical Engineers. After retirement, Guy was President of the Whitworth Society in 1952.
