= Asa Binns =

British civil engineer

- Born: 3 October 1873; Keighley, Yorkshire
- Died: 2 July 1946 (aged 72); Newbury, Berkshire
- Education: Technical College, Keighley and Yorkshire College
- Spouse(s): Annie Ogden & Sarah Lord
- Engineering career
- Discipline: Mechanical & civil engineering
- Institutions: Institution of Engineers-in-Charge (president 1936–1937); Institution of Mechanical Engineers (president 1940); Institution of Civil Engineers (elected president 1946)
- Awards: George Stephenson Gold Medal

Asa Binns (3 October 1873 – 2 July 1946) was a British mechanical and civil engineer. He trained with hydraulic pump and engine makers before becoming a draughtsman. Binns worked for a period at HMS Chatham Dockyard and rose to become head of their civil engineering works. He later worked on the construction of several major docks in London, including for the Port of London Authority. Binns served as president of the Institution of Engineers-in-Charge (1936–1937) and the Institution of Mechanical Engineers (1940). He was elected president of the Institution of Civil Engineers in 1946 but died before he could take office.

== Early life and career ==
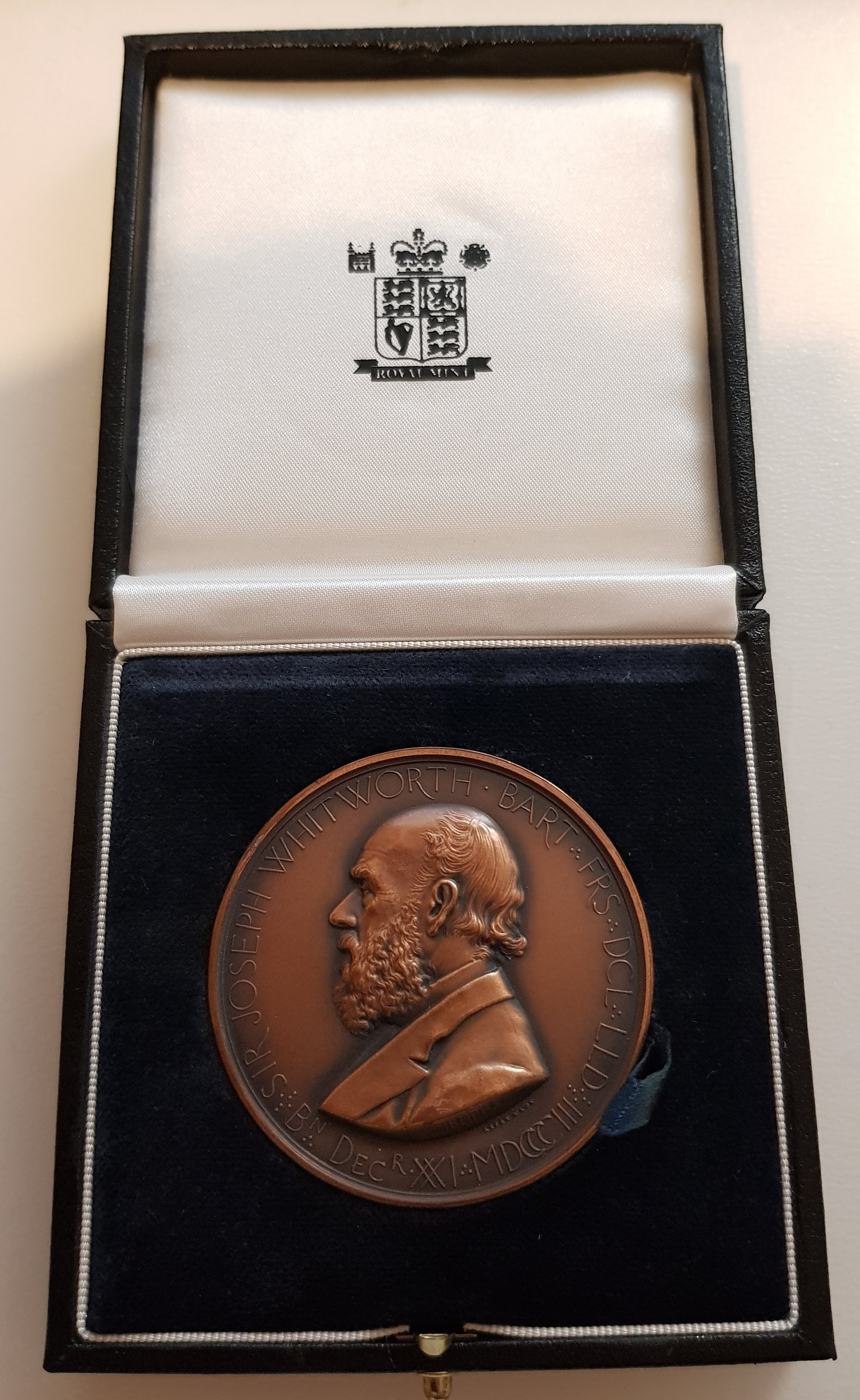
Medal of the Whitworth scholarship

Asa Binns was born on 3 October 1873 in Keighley, Yorkshire. He was educated at Keighley Grammar School, the Technical College, Keighley, and Yorkshire College, Leeds. Binns afterwards undertook a three-year engineering pupillage with the Leeds hydraulic pump maker Tannett, Walker & Company and the Bradford engine maker Cole, Marchent, and Morley Ltd. During his pupillage he was awarded a Whitworth scholarship.

After qualifying Binns was employed as a draughtsman by the Ipswich agricultural machinery manufacturer Ransomes, Sims & Jefferies and the North Eastern Railway's Hull dockyard. He was appointed draughtsman in the Admiralty Works Department in 1898 and became their chief draughtsman at HM Dockyard Chatham in 1901. Binns was promoted to assistant civil engineer of the dockyard in 1902, the same year he was elected a member of the Institution of Mechanical Engineers (IMechE). In 1903 he was elected an associate member of the Institution of Civil Engineers (ICE) and was later given charge of all civil engineering works at the dockyard.

== London docks work ==
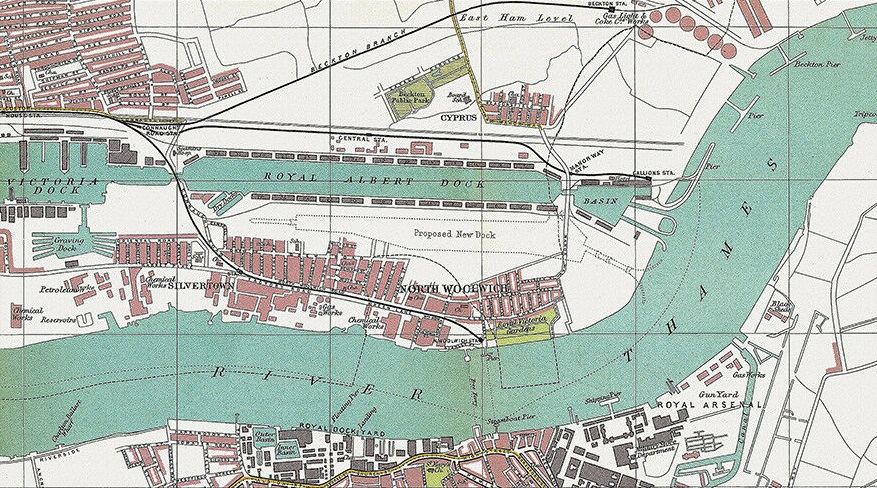
Map showing the Royal Albert Dock southern extension

Binns left the admiralty and was appointed resident engineer for the works at London Docks and St Katharine Docks in 1906. He worked for the Port of London Authority (PLA, established 1909) from 1910 as resident engineer at the Surrey Commercial Docks from 1910 and the £2 million Royal Albert Dock southern extension from 1912. Binns was elected a member of the ICE on 21 January 1913 and in 1914 sat on the IMechE's refrigeration committee, which met to establish new standards for measuring the efficiency of refrigeration machines. He worked on the construction of the King George V Dock which was completed in 1921 and was awarded the IMechE's George Stephenson Gold Medal for a paper on the project.

Binns was appointed a major in the Engineer and Railway Staff Corps, a volunteer unit providing advice to the British Army, on 25 July 1925 and later rose to lieutenant-colonel. He was appointed chief engineer to the PLA in 1928 and was elected to the council of the ICE in 1932. Binns served as president of the Institution of Engineers-in-Charge for the 1936–37 session. He retired from the PLA in 1938, entering private practice with the engineering design firm Rendel, Palmer and Tritton, though he continued to work for the PLA on a consultancy basis.

== Later life ==
Binns became president of the IMechE in 1940 and vice-president of the ICE in 1942. He served on numerous ICE committees and was inaugural chairman of the Maritime and Waterways Engineering Division, founded in 1944. Binns was elected president of the ICE on 4 June 1946 but died before the session started in November that year. William Halcrow was appointed president in his stead.

Binns died in Newbury, Berkshire on 2 July 1946. He was married twice, first to Annie Ogden with whom he had two sons and a daughter and later to Sarah Lord.

Professional and academic associations
Preceded by E. Bruce Ball	President of the Institution of Mechanical Engineers; 1940	Succeeded by William Stanier
