= Joseph Pope =

Joseph Pope may refer to:

- Joseph Pope (public servant) (1854–1926), Canadian public servant
- Joseph Pope (politician) (1803–1895), businessman and political figure in Prince Edward Island, Canada
- Joseph Pope (academic) (1914–2013), British engineer and academic administrator
