= Matthew Henry Phineas Riall Sankey =

Irish engineer (1853–1925)

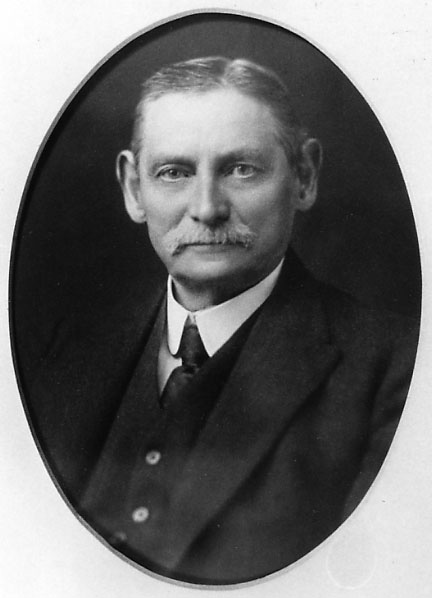
Captain H Riall Sankey

Matthew Henry Phineas Riall Sankey (9 November 1853 – 3 October 1925) was an Irish engineer and captain in the Royal Engineers, known as the creator of the Sankey diagram.

== Biography ==
Sankey was born at Nenagh in County Tipperary in 1853 as the son of General William Sankey, CB. He received his first education in Switzerland and at Mr. Rippon's School at Woolwich. Here from 1871 to 1873 he attended the Royal Military Academy, and from 1874 to 1876 the School of Military Engineering in Chatham, Kent. He married Elisabeth Pym on 5 July 1876.

In the last years of his studies Sankey started as research-assistant of the Royal Commission on Railway Accidents making calculations and experiments on railway-brakes and trails. After graduation he started at the British Army, first at the War Office on architectural design, then leading a drawing office of sixteen draughtsmen in Manchester. In Gibraltar he was superintended at the construction of barracks for a military telegraph station. From 1879 to 1882 he was instructor at the Royal Military College, Kingston, Canada, and from 1882 to 1889 back in England working for the Ordnance Survey Establishment at Southampton.

From 1889 to 1904 he was a member of the board of directors of Willans & Robinson engineers. He was appointed lead engineer and steam engine designer in 1892 after Willans died. Later he designed their new Victoria Works at Rugby. From 1904 to 1909 he was a consulting engineer in the steam and internal-combustion engineering industry. From 1909 until his death in 1925 he was a board member of Marconi's Wireless Telegraph Company, Ltd, and on the board of some other companies.

In World War I Sankey volunteered serving as a staff officer at the department of the Director of Fortifications and Works. He was decorated with the Order of the Bath (CB) and the Order of the British Empire (CBE) for his service in World War I. In 1916 Sankey was a member of the Hardness Tests Research Committee appointed in 1914 “to report on a Hardness Test for Hardened Journals and Pins” (The Institute of Mechanical Engineers, November, 1916, 677-778)

He was also president of the Institution of Mechanical Engineers.

He died due to heart failure on 3 October 1925 in his residence in Ealing.

== Work ==
=== Sankey diagram ===
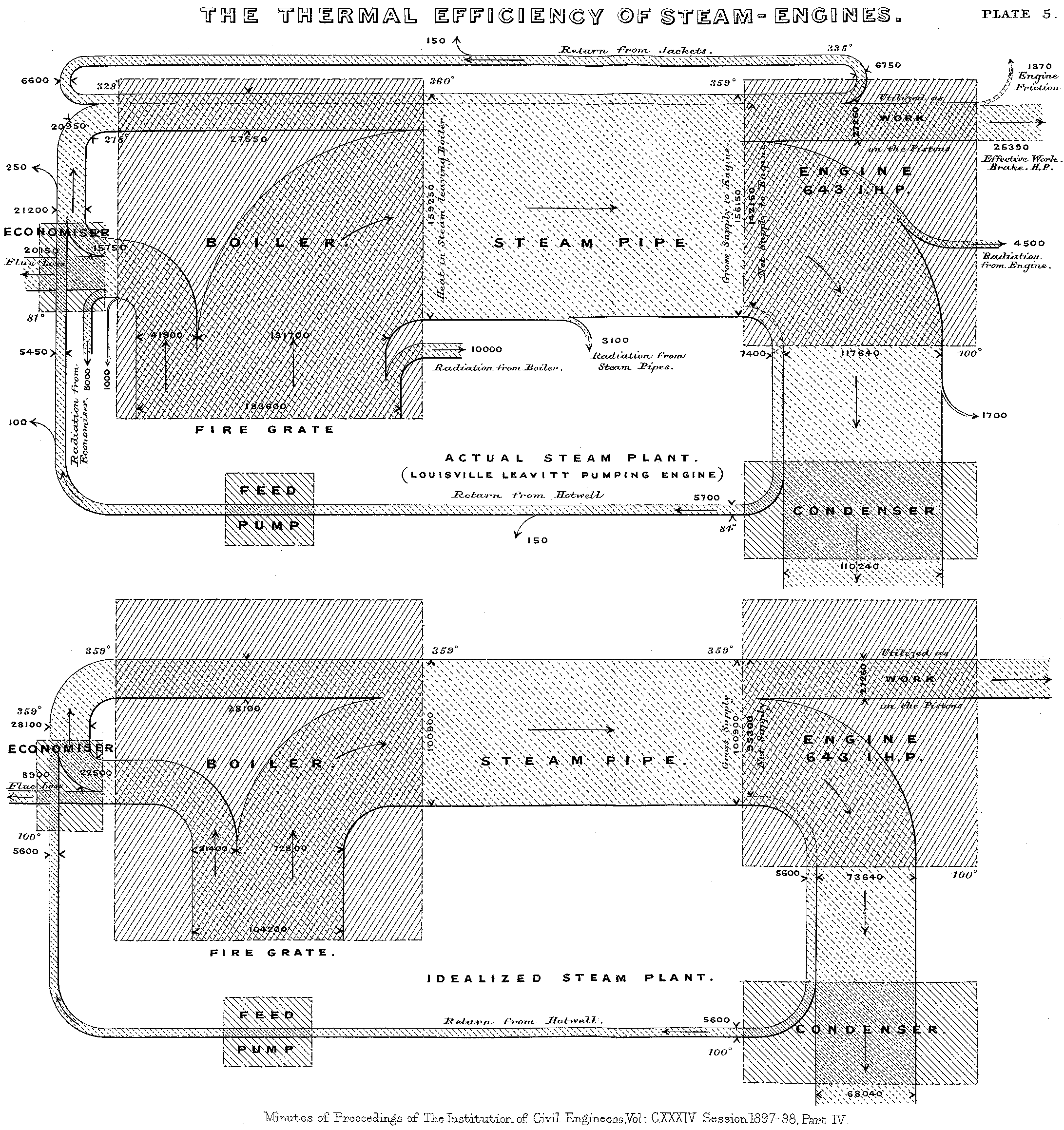
Sankey's diagram, 1898

In an 1898 article about the energy efficiency of a steam engine in the Minutes of Proceedings of the Institution of Civil Engineers Sankey introduced the first energy flow diagram: a visualisation to be christened Sankey diagram. Sankey gave the following explanation how to read the image:

"No portion of a steam plant is perfect, and each is the seat of losses more or less serious. If therefore it is desired to improve the steam plant as a whole, it is first of all necessary to ascertain separately the nature of the losses due to its various portions; and in this connection the diagrams in Plate 5 have been prepared, which it is hoped may assist to a clearer understanding of the nature and extent of the various losses.
The boiler; the engine; the condenser and air-pump; the feedpump and the economiser, are indicated by rectangles upon the diagram. The flow of heat is shown as a stream, the width of which gives the amount of heat entering and leaving each part of the plant per unit of time; the losses are shown by the many waste branches of the stream. Special attention is called to the one (unfortunately small) branch which represents the work done upon the pistons of the engine."

Originally created by Charles Joseph Minard (for the Russian campaign of 1812) to show the number of Napoleon's soldiers going to and from Russia, Sankey adapted the method for energy flow. This presentation made an impression. Four years later in 1902 Robert Henry Thurston among others acknowledged, that the heat distribution of the then modern steam engine was best shown by the use of the so-called "Sankey Diagram".

=== Patents ===
Sankey received at least four patents for an expansion-gear for engines (1894), a turbine (1905), a reversible turbine (1907), and a steam-turbine (1907).

== Publications ==
Books:

- 1879. Elementary theory and calculation of iron bridges and roofs. English translation of August Ritter's German book of 1863.
- 1898. Temperature Entropy Or [theta Phi] Chart for 1 Lb. of H2O: Giving Also Volumes, Absolute Pressures and Dryness Fractions, Internal Energy, Water Heat, and Total Heat in British Thermal Units. Frost & Sons
- 1911. Gas engines. with William Johnstone Marshall
- 1907. The Energy Chart: Practical Applications to Reciprocating Steam-engines. E. & F.N. Spon

Articles, a selection:

- 1888. "The Maps of the Ordnance Survey: a mid-Victorian view". in: Engineering, a weekly illustrated journal. Charles Close Society London. Republished in 1995.
- 1896. "The Thermal Efficiency of Steam-Engines". In: Minutes of Proceedings of the Institution of Civil Engineers 125, 1896, S. 182–242.
- 1898. "Introductory Note on the Thermal Efficiency of Steam-Engines". in: Minutes of Proceedings of the Institution of Civil Engineers. Vol. 134, p. 278–283

Professional and academic associations
Preceded by Edward Hopkinson	President of the Institution of Mechanical Engineers; 1920–1921	Succeeded by Henry Selby Hele-Shaw
