= Ernest George Coker =

British mathematician and engineer

Prof Ernest George Coker FRS FRSE MIME MICE Wh.Ex. (26 April 1869 – 9 April 1946) was a British mathematician and engineer. He won the Howard N. Potts Medal for Physics in 1922, and the Rumford Medal for work on polarised light in 1936. He was an expert on stress analysis and Photoelasticity. He contributed to Encyclopædia Britannica and other works under the initials E.G.C.

== Life ==
He was born on 26 April 1869 in Wolverton in Buckinghamshire the son of George Coker, an engine-fitter, and his wife, Sarah Tompkins. His birthplace is often wrongly stated as Wolverhampton.

He was educated at a private school at Stony Stratford. In 1890 he won a Whitworth Scholarship allowing him to study at the Royal College of Science in London and then both the University of Edinburgh and Peterhouse, Cambridge where he graduated with a Mechanical Sciences Tripos in 1896.

His early jobs included Assistant Examiner of Patents at H M Patent Office in London. In 1898 he won the post of Assistant Professor of Civil Engineering at McGill University in Montreal. Coker returned to Britain, and in 1901 he received a DSc from the University of Edinburgh. In 1905 he took the role of Professor of Mechanical Engineering and Applied Mathematics at Finsbury Technical College, then in 1914 got the chair in Civil and Mechanical Engineering at University College, London (now UCL).

He received honorary doctorates from three universities: Edinburgh, Sydney and Louvain.

In 1903 he was elected a Fellow of the Royal Society of Edinburgh and 1916 a Fellow of the Royal Society of London. In 1921 he was awarded a Telford Medal by the Institution of Civil Engineers and in 1922, in recognition of his work on the photo-elastic method of measuring stress, a Howard N. Potts gold medal for physics by the Franklin Institute. In 1924 he was an Invited Speaker of the ICM in Toronto.

He retired in 1934 and became President of the Whitworth Society a year later in 1935.

Coker died at The Gables, Wheatfield Road in Ayr on 9 April 1946.

== Family ==
He married Alice Mary King (d.1941) in 1899.
