= Whitworth Society =

The Whitworth Society
- Formation: 12 January 1923
- Founder: H. S. Hele-Shaw
- Key people: President: Rupert Shute
- Website: whitworthsociety.org

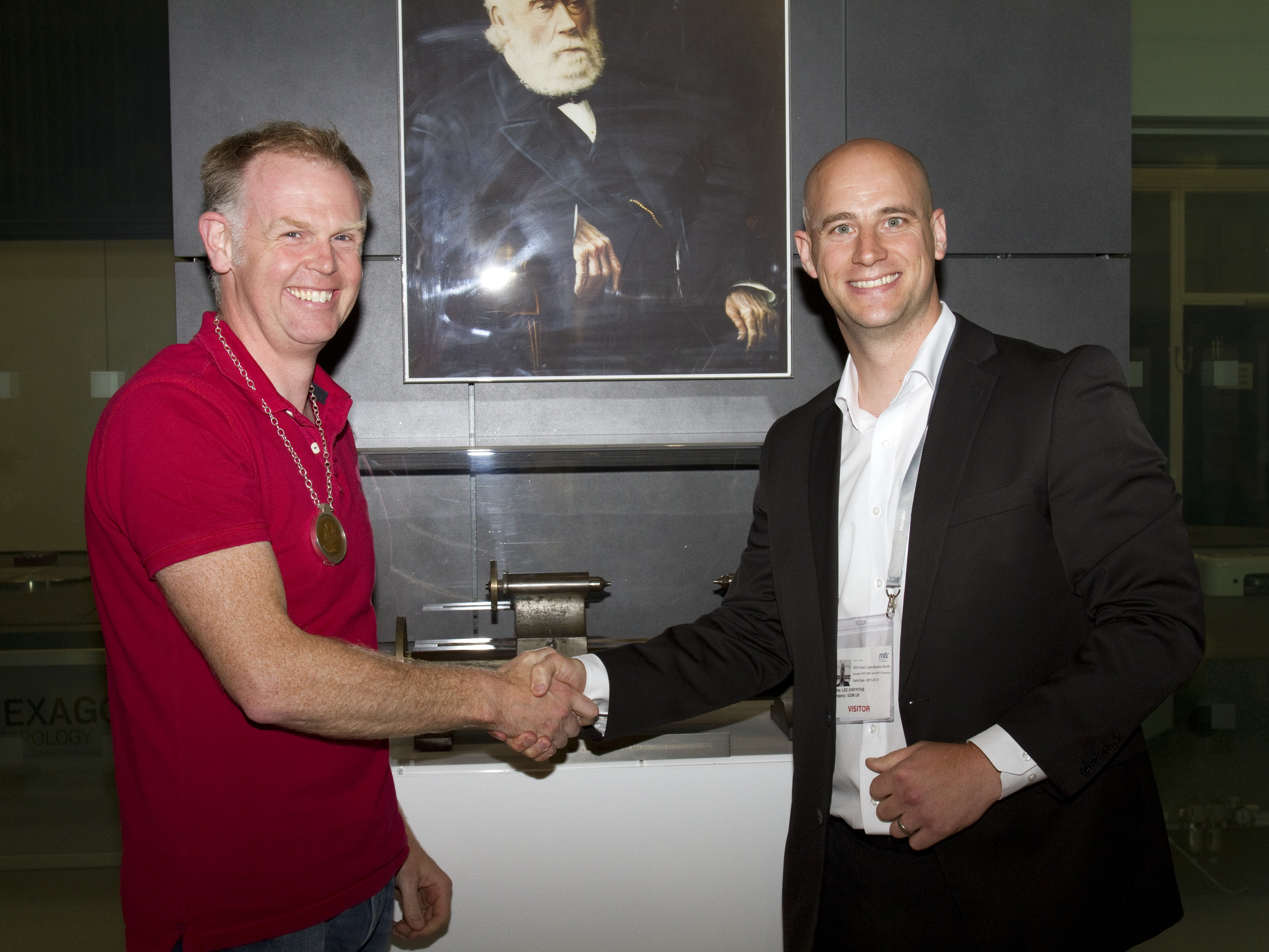
Handover of Presidential office between Lee Griffiths (2016 President, right) to Howard Stone (2017 President, left) at the Manufacturing Technology Centre in front of Joseph Whitworth's portrait and lathe

The Whitworth Society was founded in 1923 by Henry Selby Hele-Shaw, then president of the Institution of Mechanical Engineers. Its purposes are to promote engineering in the United Kingdom, and more specifically to support all Whitworth Scholars, the recipients of a scholarship funded by Joseph Whitworth's scholarship scheme, which started in 1868. A Whitworth Scholar is the result of completing a successful Whitworth Scholarship. Membership of the society is limited to Whitworth Scholars, Senior Scholars, Fellows, Exhibitioners and Prizemen. The society is a way for making contact with all successful "Whitworths" and provides a way for making information contacts and connections from more senior members to recently successful Scholars. The society also serves as a way to commemorate Joseph Whitworth and acknowledge his contributions to engineering education.

== Activities ==
=== Commemorative dinner and annual general meeting ===
The annual dinner and annual general meeting is held on the evening of 18 March (or nearest Friday to) to commemorate the date in 1868 when Joseph Whitworth wrote to Benjamin Disraeli, offering to found the Whitworth Scholarships. Traditionally the dinner has been held in London until more recent times where the meal and meeting is alternated, one-year London and one-year Manchester.

=== Summer meeting ===
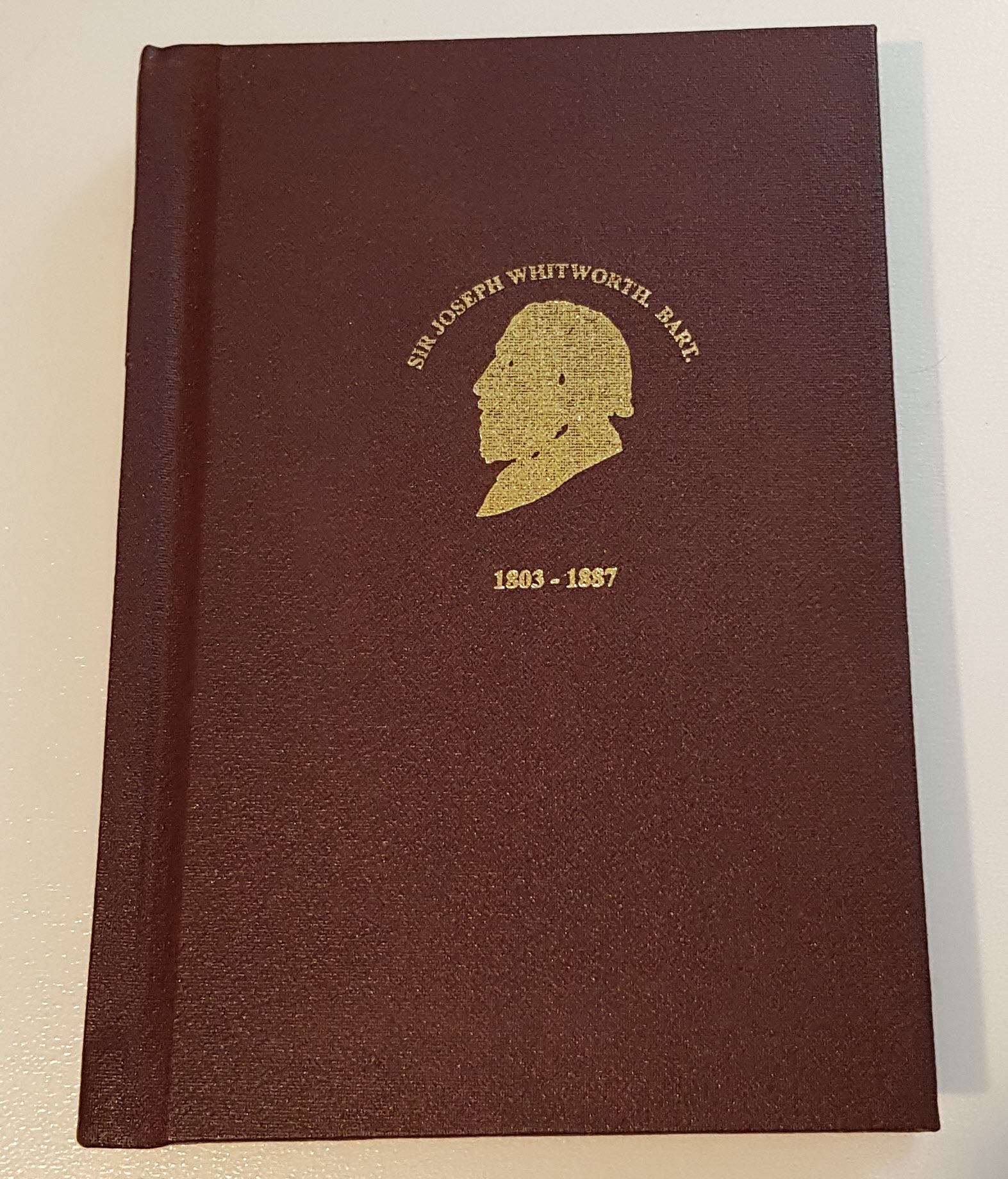
An image of the Whitworth Register from 2007.

There is a summer meeting held over two-days normally at the beginning of July. The event is largely informal and ordinarily arranged by the president of the society.

=== Record ===
A record of all scholars is kept by the society, until recent years, this was in hardback form (see image) presented when an individual was elected a scholar. In recent times, the register is kept electronically and provided by USB flash drive as part of the awards ceremony.

== Whitworth Scholarship ==
A Whitworth Scholarship, named after Joseph Whitworth, is an "award for outstanding engineers, who have excellent academic and practical skills and the qualities needed to succeed in industry, to take an engineering degree-level programme in any engineering discipline".

=== Background ===
On 18 March 1868, Joseph Whitworth wrote to then Prime Minister Benjamin Disraeli to fund 30 scholarships for the value of £100 for young men in the United Kingdom. This was met favourably by the Government at the time as minuted on 27 March 1868 by the council. After the adoption of this by Government, Whitworth presented a memorandum setting out the requirements of the awards which included examinations in mathematics, mechanics, physics, and chemistry, including metallurgy and in the following handicrafts: Smith's Work, turning, filing, fitting, pattern making and moulding.

Whitworth's intent was to support those individuals with practical skills, training, typically those who today have completed an apprenticeship who had the desire to continue onto further, higher education, university degree courses. The Scholarships continue over 150-years after inception of the idea. In 2018 the prize money awarded is up to £9,000 per annum for an undergraduate programme and £15,000 per annum for a post graduate research programme. The prize money is still funded by the original money provided in Trust by Joseph Whitworth.

The criteria for a scholarship remains consistent with the original mandate of 1868, practical skills with aptitude for science and mathematic based academia. In 2018, the conditions for application for a scholarship are to:

- Have pursued a vocational training route (i.e. apprenticeship) in an engineering discipline typically for at least 2 years after having left full-time education (generally UK secondary education or college based study) and before entering a degree-level engineering course.
- Have obtained or will obtain an appropriate qualification for admission to the planned engineering degree-level programme of any engineering discipline.
- Be British, Commonwealth or European Union citizen, and resident in the UK for at least 3 consecutive years immediately prior to undertaking study in the UK at a College of FE/HE or university

In 1984, as a result of consultation with the Whitworth Society, the administration of the Awards and Scholarship programmes was transferred from the Department of Education & Science (at the time) to the Institution of Mechanical Engineers.

=== Current scholarship ===
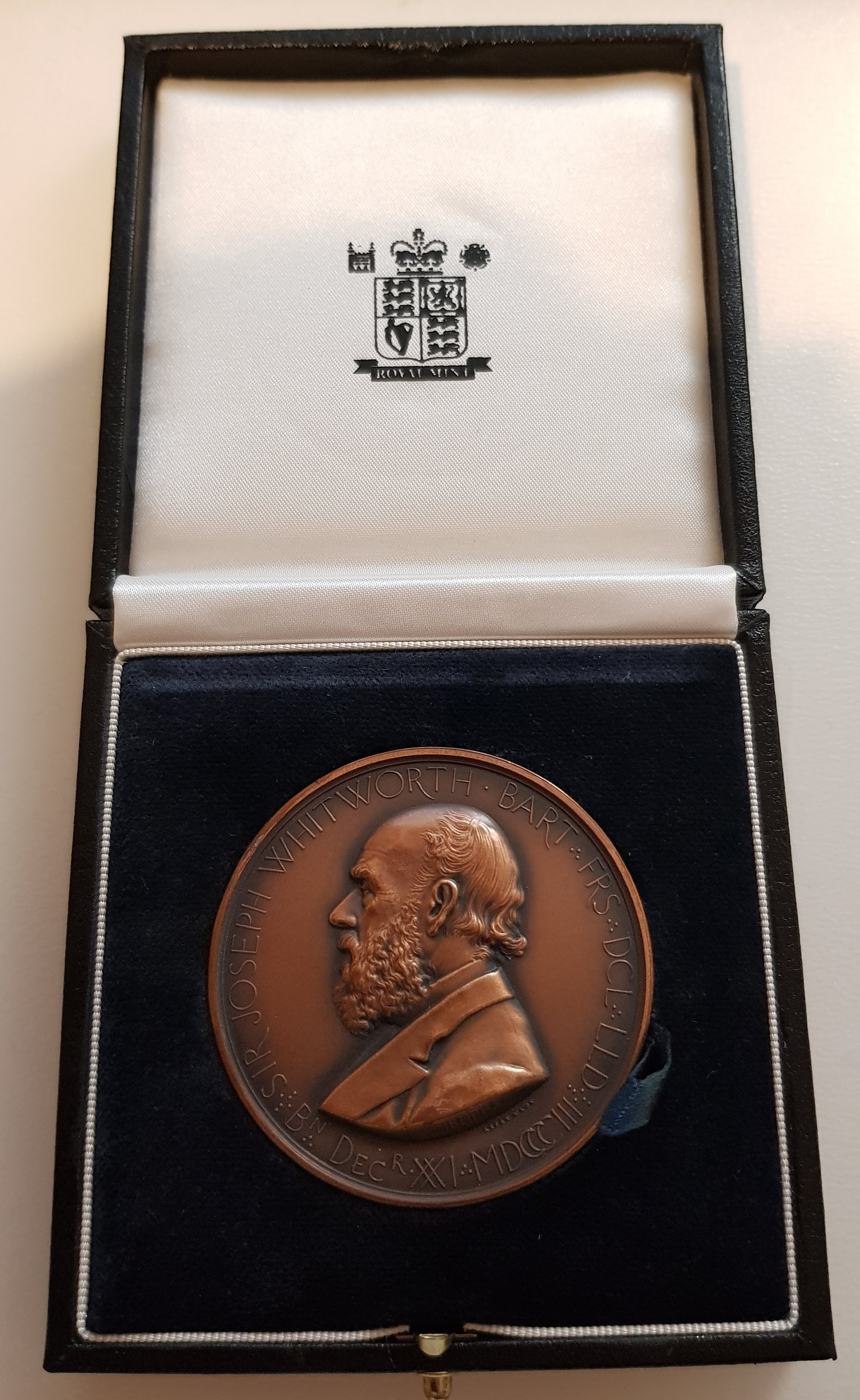
Whitworth Medal, presented to successful Scholars and engraved on the outside diameter with the individual's name. These are produced by the Royal Mint, London in Bronze.

Today, the scholarship programme lasts for the duration of an individual's academic studies, typically 3–4 years of full-time degree studies. During this time, the individuals are termed "award holders".

If the continued monitoring of progress and overall academic achievement is deemed satisfactory, the award holder becomes a Whitworth Scholar. This occasion is commemorated at the Institution of Mechanical Engineers Vision Awards ceremony ordinarily carried out in the September/October period of each year.

== Whitworth Scholar ==
A Whitworth Scholar is the accolade given to those who have successfully completed a Whitworth Scholarship. It is rare on the basis that only a small number of scholarships are issued each year which has quite specific application conditions and a tough review process.

A Whitworth Scholar is permitted to use the post-nominal letters, WhSch.

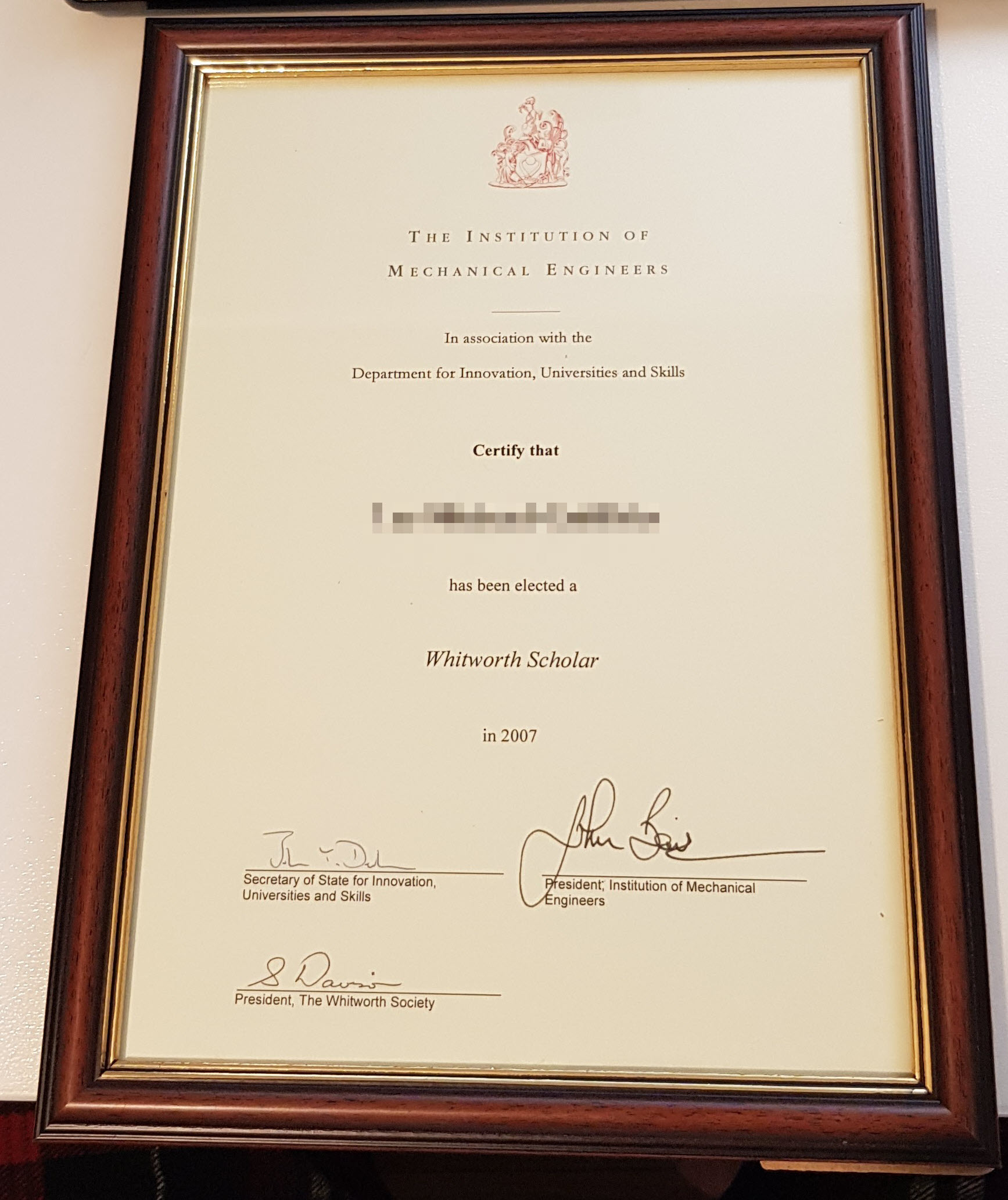
An example certificate presented to an individual when they have been elected a Whitworth Scholar.

Typically there is an awards ceremony for the successful scholars where a certificate and medal (shown opposite) are presented. In recent years forms part of the IMechE's vision awards in September/October time each year.

=== Post nominals ===
There are recognised post-nominals which are permitted to be used after an individual's name. They are as follows.

Post Nominal	Designation
WhSch	Whitworth Scholarship
WhSSch	Whitworth Senior Scholar
WhEx	Whitworth Exhibitioner
WhF	Whitworth Fellow
WhPr	Whitworth Prizeman

== Officers ==
No.	Year of Taking Office	President	Honorary Treasurer	Honorary Secretary
1	1923	Henry Selby Hele-Shaw	D. A. Low	E. R. Dolby
2	1924	R. B. Buckley		
3	1925	Williamm Sisson		
4	1926	F. P. Purvis		
5	1927	Thomas Sugden		
6	1928	F. H. Livens		
7	1929	W. H. Fowler		
8	1930	Henry Fowler		
9	1931	F. C. Lea		
10	1932	D. A. Low		
11	1933	E. R. Dolby		S. J. Davies
12	1934	Charles Day		
13	1935	Ernest George Coker	J. Hamilton Gibson	
14	1936	Henry Japp		
15	1937	A. Havelock Case		
16	1938	W. Price Abell		
17	1939	Edmund Bruce Ball		
18	1940	Asa Binns		
19	1941	A. L. Mellanby	I. V. Robinson	
20	1945	Harry Wimperis		
21	1946	L. H. Hounsfield		
22	1947	Andrew Robertson		F. T. Barwell
23	1948	I. V. Robinson		
24	1949	H. Shoosmith		
25	1950	H. H. Johnson		
26	1951	S. F. Dorey		
27	1952	Henry Lewis Guy		
28	1953	S. J. Davies		
29	1954	A. R. Valon		
30	1955	Richard William Bailey		
31	1956	P. L. Jones		
32	1957	E. Markham	F. T. Barwell	R. G. Woolacott
33	1958	G. W. Daniels		
34	1959	A. Hoare (to Dec 1959)		
35	1959	G. W. Daniels (from Dec 1959)		
36	1960	F. H. Reid		
37	1961	W. Ker Wilson		
38	1962	A. Sykes		
39	1963	Douglas George Sopwith		
40	1964	W. F. Harlow		
41	1965	R. J. Welsh	M. J. Neale	
42	1966	F. T. Barwell		
43	1967	E. C. Mills		
44	1968	J. Diamond		
45	1969	P. P. Love		
46	1970	D. H. New		
47	1971	D. W. Ginns		
48	1972	Herbert Haslegrave		
49	1973	Hugh Ford		
50	1974	N. E. Rowe		
51	1975	R. G. Voysey	E. K. Armstrong	M. J. C. Swainston
52	1976	M. J. Neale		
53	1977	J. W. Drinkwater		
54	1978	Joseph A. Pope		
55	1979	J. G. Watkins		
56	1980	M. D. Wood		
57	1981	T. Matthewson-Dick		
58	1982	H. G. R. Robinson		
59	1983	A. G. Gledhill		
60	1984	R. G. Woolacott		
61	1985	Denning Pearson		
62	1986	L. I. Farren		
63	1987	G. W. Watson		
64	1988	R. A. Hore		F. M. Burrows
65	1989	W. G. N. Buckland		
66	1990	E. K. Armstrong		
67	1991	M. J. C. Swainston		
68	1992	R. A. Clarke		
69	1993	J. H. Weaving		
70	1994	G. M. Ward.		
71	1995	H. J. C. Weighell	B. M. Coaker	F. M. Burrows
72	1996	K. Patricia Baglin		
73	1997	D. J. Faulkner		
74	1998	P. C. Young		
75	1999	D. L. Clamp		
76	2000	R. J. Mistry		
77	2001	M. D. Black		
78	2002	B. J. Hutchinson		
79	2003	B. M. Coaker		
80	2004	D. J. Wood		
81	2005	S. T. Beck		
82	2006	M. A. Comer		
83	2007	S. Davison		
84	2008	P. Whyman		
85	2009	H. B. J. Stone		
86	2010	V. J. (Bradley) Sims		
87	2011	D. G. Eaves		V. J. (Bradley) Sims
88	2012	G. Cooke		
89	2013	K. D. Dearn		
90	2014	S. A. Witting		
91	2015	B. H. Hughes		
92	2016	L. M. Griffiths		
93	2017	H. B. J. Stone	Rachael Hoyle	
94	2018	B. M. Coaker		
95	2019	James Potten		Michael F. Kelly
96	2020	Jenny Kenny		
97	2021	Laura Gilbert		
98	2022	Chris Sidney		
99	2023	Kevin Urquhart	Laura Gilbert	
100	2024	Rachael Hoyle		
101	2025	Rupert Shute		

== See also ==
- List of mechanical engineering awards
