= List of fellows of the Royal Society elected in 1940 =

Fellows of Royal Society elected in 1940.

== Fellows ==
1. William Thomas Astbury
2. Sir Gavin de Beer
3. Oliver Meredith Boone Bulman
4. John Cadman, 1st Baron Cadman
5. Gilbert Cook
6. Harold Davenport
7. Sir Charles F. Goodeve
8. Frederick Gugenheim Gregory
9. Sir Alister Hardy
10. Charles Halliley Kellaway
11. Sir Kariamanickam Srinivasa Krishnan
12. Sir Reginald Patrick Linstead
13. Otto Maass
14. Sir Harrie Massey
15. Sir Bryan Matthews
16. William Harold Pearsall
17. Juda Hirsch Quastel
18. Andrew Robertson
19. Leonard Frank Spath
20. Willie Sucksmith

== Foreign members ==
1. Maurice de Broglie
2. Ross Granville Harrison
3. Gilbert Newton Lewis
4. Francis Peyton Rous
