= Henry Selby Hele-Shaw =

British engineer (1854–1941)

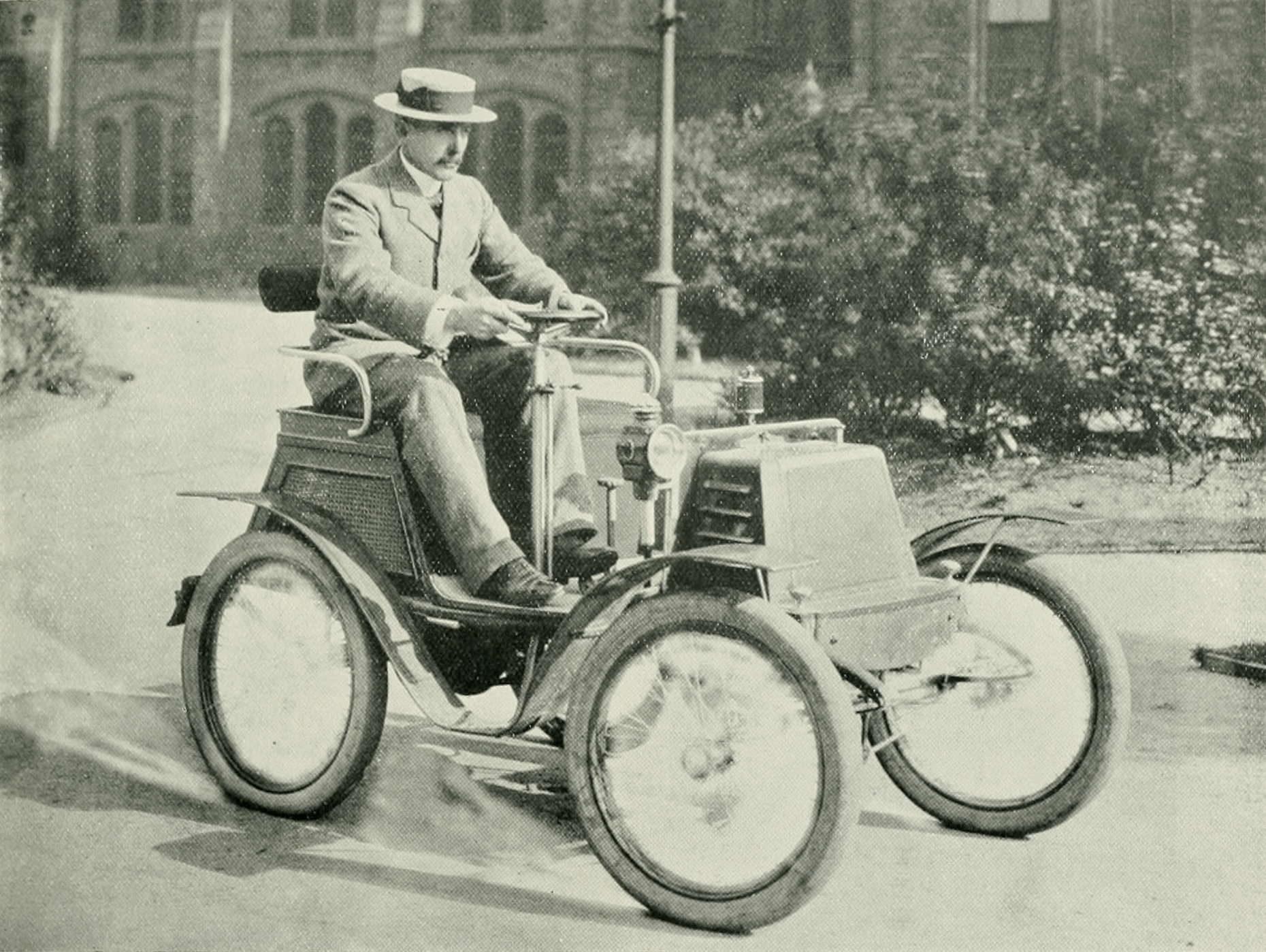
This photo of Henry Selby Hele-Shaw appeared in Page's Magazine, August 1902.

Henry Selby Hele-Shaw FRS (1854–1941) was an English mechanical and automobile engineer. He was the inventor of the variable-pitch propeller, which contributed to British success in the Battle of Britain in 1940, and he experimented with flows through thin cells. Flows through such configurations are named in his honour (Hele-Shaw flows). He was also a co-founder of Victaulic.

== Life ==
Born on 29 July 1854 at Billericay, he was the eldest son of Henry Shaw (1825 – 1880), a lawyer who went bankrupt, and his wife Marion Selby Hele (1834 – 1891), daughter of the Reverend Henry Selby Hele, vicar of Grays Thurrock and grandson of the Reverend George Horne. He was first articled at the age of 17 to Messrs Rouch and Leaker, at the Mardyke Engineering Works, Bristol and served an engineering apprenticeship until 1876. Hele-Shaw was also elected a Whitworth Scholar.

In 1880 he became the first Professor of Engineering at University College, Bristol, but left four years later to became the first person to hold the Harrison Chair of Engineering at Liverpool University College.

He was elected Fellow of the Royal Society in 1899 for his work on the flow of liquid between parallel glass plates, and served as President of the Institution of Mechanical Engineers in 1922. He was President of the Society of Model & Experimental Engineers.

In 1923 Hele-Shaw founded the Whitworth Society and was the Society's first President. The Whitworth Society still exists and provides an informal contact between all ages of Whitworth Scholar and a means to promote engineering in the UK. The aim of the society is to bring closer those who have benefited from Sir Joseph Whitworth's generosity.

He was awarded the Franklin Institute's Certificate of Merit in 1933.

He died on 30 January 1941 at Ross-on-Wye.

== Lectures ==
In 1902 Hele-Shaw was invited to deliver the Royal Institution Christmas Lecture Locomotion : On the Earth, Through the Water, in the Air.

== See also ==
- Hele-Shaw clutch
- Victaulic

Professional and academic associations
Preceded by Matthew Henry Phineas Riall Sankey	President of the Institution of Mechanical Engineers; 1922	Succeeded by Sir John Dewrance
