= Victaulic =

Developer and producer of mechanical pipe joining systems

- Type: Private
- Industry: Manufacturing
- Headquarters: Easton, Pennsylvania, United States
- Area served: Worldwide
- Key people: John F. Malloy (executive chairman); Richard A. Bucher (president and CEO)
- Products: Mechanical pipe-joining systems, flow-control products, and fire-protection equipment
- Website: www.victaulic.com

Victaulic is an American manufacturer of mechanical pip-joining, flow control, and fire-protection systems, with its headquarters being in Easton Pennsylvania. "Shapiro Administration Secures $100 Million Expansion by Manufacturing Company Victaulic, Helping to Create 214 New Jobs in Tioga County". Commonwealth of Pennsylvania. July 2, 2024. British engineers Ernest Tribe and Henry Selby Hele-Shaw developed the grooved mechanical pipe coupling and filed a patent for the technology in 1919. "Lehigh Valley-Based Manufacturer Victaulic Celebrates 100th Anniversary". Lehigh Valley Economic Development Corporation. April 5, 2019."Grooved Pipe Joining Technology – Grooved Couplings". Victaulic. That technology became the basis for the Victaulic coupling and the Victory Pipe Joint Company in 1922."100 Years of Innovation". Victaulic.

Victaulic manufactures grooved couplings, fittings, valves, fire protection systems, and other mechanical piping products used in commercial and industrial applications, including water and wastewater, power generation, oil and gas, and building systems."Mechanical Joining Products & Pipe System Products". Victaulic."Pipe Fittings, Adapters & Outlets Product Listings". Victaulic. The company operates more than 50 facilities worldwide, employs more than 6,000 people, and serves customers in more than 140 countries."Find a Victaulic Location Worldwide". Victaulic.

== Products and technology ==
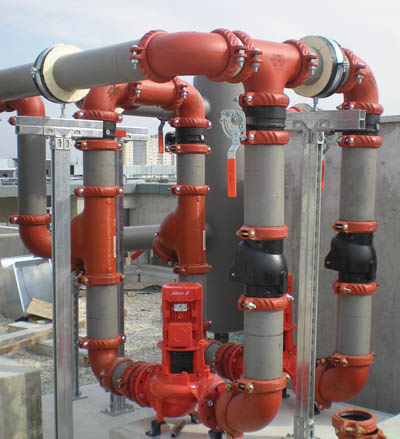
Victaulic couplings (painted red) are used to join pipe segments

Grooved mechanical pipe-joining systems rely on four basic components: a groove cut or rolled near the pipe ends, a gasket, a coupling housing, and bolts and nuts. An elastomeric gasket is fitted around the adjoining pipe ends, and the coupling housing engages the grooves to hold the joint together. Once tightened, the housing secures the pipe ends while the gasket seals against the outside diameter of the pipe. This is a pressure-responsive design, meaning internal pressure presses the gasket lips more firmly against the pipe surface, reinforcing the seal instead of potentially weakening it.

Grooved mechanical pipe-joining systems also do not require flanges to be formed or welded onto the pipe ends, allowing sections of piping to be assembled or disassembled by removing the coupling housing. Conventional flanged joints, by contrast, use bolts to compress a gasket between the flat mating faces of two flanges; disassembly can cause the gasket to tear, often requiring a new gasket upon reinstallation.

Victaulic specializes in the development of couplings, valves, and fitting technologies for a variety of industries. Its main products are:

- Grooved couplings used to join mechanical pipes together. The company produces a variety of these grooved couplings along with other technologies since it was founded.
- A fire suppression system intended for critical locations like data centers. It emits a mix of water and nitrogen from a single source that simultaneously cools the affected area and extinguishes the fire. It is approved for use in areas containing flammable liquids and hazardous machinery.
- Sprinkler heads and Sprinkler systems, grooved valves and grooved pipe fittings, and expansion joints.

== History ==
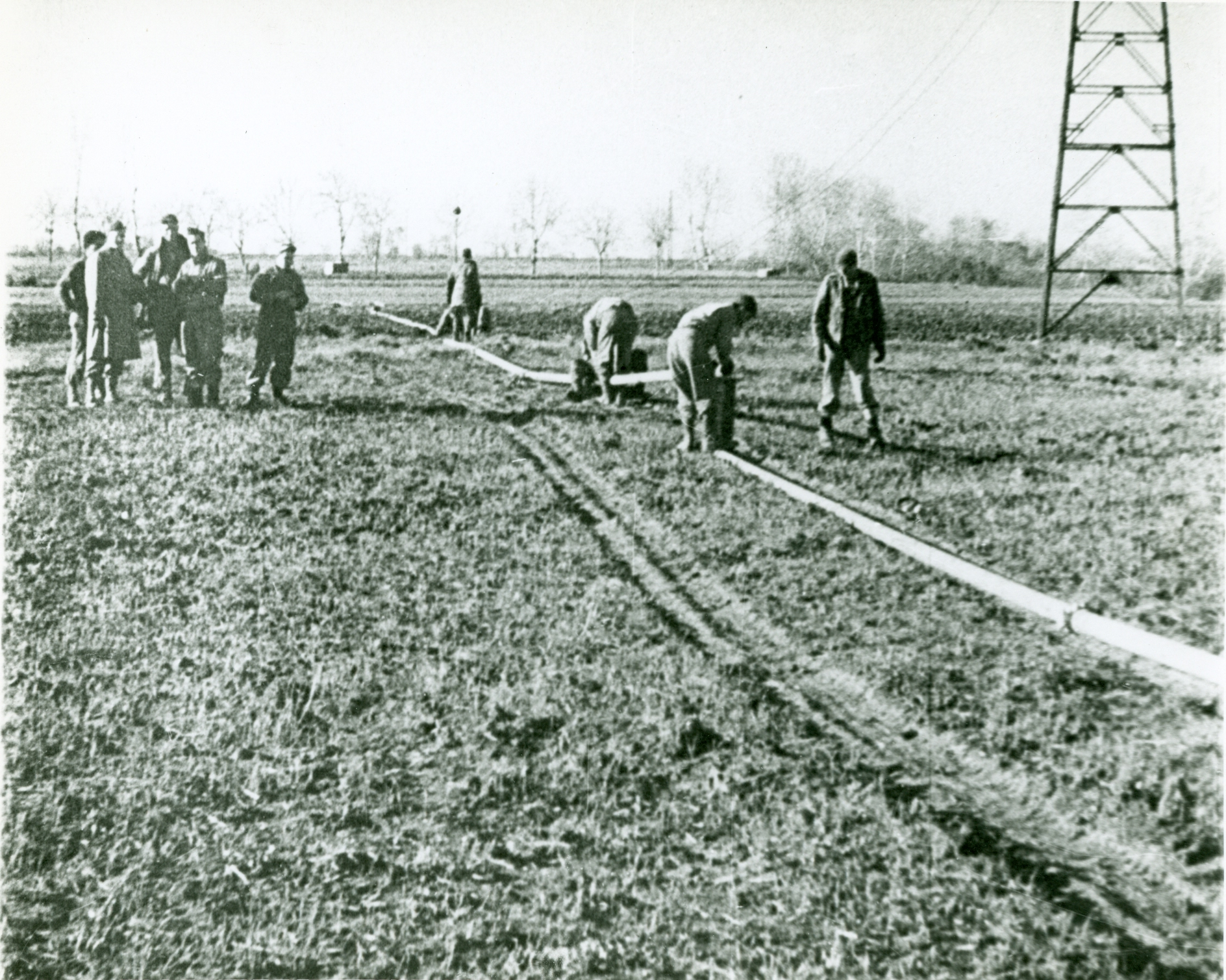
World War II field installation with Victaulic couplings

The original purpose of the Victaulic pipe joint was for military applications but quickly gained popularity in other commercial and industrial markets. The concept emerged when inventor Lieutenant Ernest Tribe, of the Royal Engineers, devised a special form of joint for use on pipes and cylinders containing gases and chemicals under very high pressure. Tribe, in conjunction with Dr Henry Hele-Shaw, a noted English hydraulic engineer, had been engaged by the British Government during the war to advance trench warfare tactics.

On 4 April 1919, Lt Tribe filed the patent for what is now known as the Victaulic coupling.

My invention is for an improved pipe joint which obviates the necessity for raising flanges at the ends of the pipes to be joined. I do not attempt to butt the ends of pipe together in order to form a fluid-tight joint, either with or without a packing ring between, but employ instead one packing ring made of flexible material, the form of which is an essential feature of the invention.

— Tribe U.K. Patent 149,381 filing – 4 April 1919.

Shortly thereafter, the Victory Pipe Joint Co. was established in London, England and a second patent was filed in both names. Dr Hele-Shaw had numerous inventions including the multiple-plate clutch, stream-line filter, variable-pitch propeller, and Victaulic pipe joint.

Victaulic fittings were used in tunnels, ship work, and borings. The demand for dependable pipeline systems increased during World War II. The earlier methods of distributing petroleum during war included shipping it overseas and dispersing by tank car, truck, or rail.

Early applications of Victaulic's fittings included pipelines installed in tunnels, ships, and boreholes, where space constraints or movement made conventional flanged joints less practical. According to the company's corporate history, Victaulic couplings were used during the Second World War in shipboard piping and temporary pipelines that distributed water and fuel.

Victaulic later established manufacturing and administrative operations in Pennsylvania's Lehigh Valley, breaking ground on its Forks Township headquarters in 1976. By 2019, the company was expanding manufacturing operations in China, Poland, and Canada, and was preparing to open a manufacturing facility in Lower Nazareth Township, Pennsylvania.

Victaulic also operates a foundry in Lawrenceville, in Tioga County. In 2024, the company announced a $100 million expansion of the facility, supported by $1.5 million in Pennsylvania state funding. The project was expected to create at least 214 jobs and retain 1,611 positions statewide. Construction on the expansion began in 2026.

== Notable projects ==
During the renovation and expansion of the underground museum beneath the Gateway Arch in St. Louis, Victaulic couplings were used for temporary low pressure steam piping while portions of the facility remained operational. The grooved system allowed the project team to avoid welding, hot-work permits, and restrictive regulations that go along with that type of work. This helped reduce installation time and maintain the construction schedule. Engineered Systems reported that the museum's steam piping system used Victaulic Style 870 rigid couplings and fittings.

At Mercedes-Benz Stadium in Atlanta, Victaulic's Advanced Grooved System flexible couplings were used in mechanical piping to accommodate structural movement and the unique odd created by the stadium's unique architecture. A combination of both flexible and rigid couplings was used throughout the piping system, while Victaulic's engineers designed expansion loops specifically for this building's four corners. Victaulic also manufactured dozens of 24-inch (610 mm) pipe headers for the condenser water system. All said and done, the stadium has nearly 10 miles (16 km) of heating, cooling, potable-water and stormwater piping.

For Beijing National Stadium, which was constructed for the 2008 Summer Olympics, Process Engineering reported that the Beijing Olympic Committee along with the project's primary contractors chose Victaulic's jointed piping system for the stadium's HVAC system. This system used flexible grooved couplings to follow the structure's irregular angles and accommodate its deflection requirements.

At the City of London headquarters of N. M. Rothschild & Sons, consulting engineer Arup and the Rothschild's engineering team changed the HVAC specification from welded pipework to Victaulic grooved end joints to address recurring maintenance and space constraints. The building was dealing with having to periodically replace rubber bellows, and the new mechanical rooms needed a pump system with a smaller footprint. Flexible couplings were used in place of rubber bellows, and suction diffusers reduced the length of straight pipe required at pump inlets. Victaulic also worked with mechanical contractor Briggs & Forrester to produce three dimensional piping drawings and plan material deliveries.

== Litigation ==
In 2014, Benson Tower Condominium owners brought an action against Victaulic relating to alleged elastomer degradation due to chloramine and temperatures. Plaintiff alleges that "[s]ince the early 1990s, Victaulic was aware that its Victaulic Products were susceptible to failure when exposed to chloramines or other approved and recommended applications and that the failure of the Victaulic Products caused damage to the systems and buildings into which they were installed." FAC ¶ 78. Specifically, "[b]efore construction of [Benson Tower], Victaulic knew that the Victaulic Products would fail when exposed to temperatures far less than 230°F, even though Victaulic represented and approved that the Victaulic Products were acceptable and recommended for use up to 230 °F. Victaulic failed to disclose this fact to its consumers, including Plaintiff." Victaulic filed a motion to dismiss the Plaintiff's claims. In the end, the court rule that "defendant Victaulic Company's motion to dismiss Plaintiff's claims for fraud, negligent misrepresentation, and violation of the UTPA and to strike punitive damages (Dkt. 58) is granted in part and denied in part." In the end, Victaulic paid $2 million to the condo association.

In 2017, Victaulic settled $600,000 in a claim brought against the company for U.S. trade compliance violations. Customs Fraud Investigations, LLC suspected Victaulic Company failed to pay marking duties to the United States by knowingly importing unmarked foreign-made pipe fittings without telling United States Customs. The case and ruling continue to be used as a reference for trade compliance and customs laws.

== See also ==
- Ductile iron pipe – Pipe made of ductile cast iron
- Fire sprinkler system – Fire protection method
- Mechanical joint – Section of a machine which is used to connect one mechanical part to another
- National Fire Protection Association – International nonprofit organization
- Pipe support – Element that transfers loads from a pipe to supporting structures
- Piping and plumbing fitting – Connecting pieces in pipe systems
