= Joseph Whitworth =

English engineer, entrepreneur, inventor and philanthropist (1803–1887)

Sir Joseph Whitworth FRS FRSA Bt
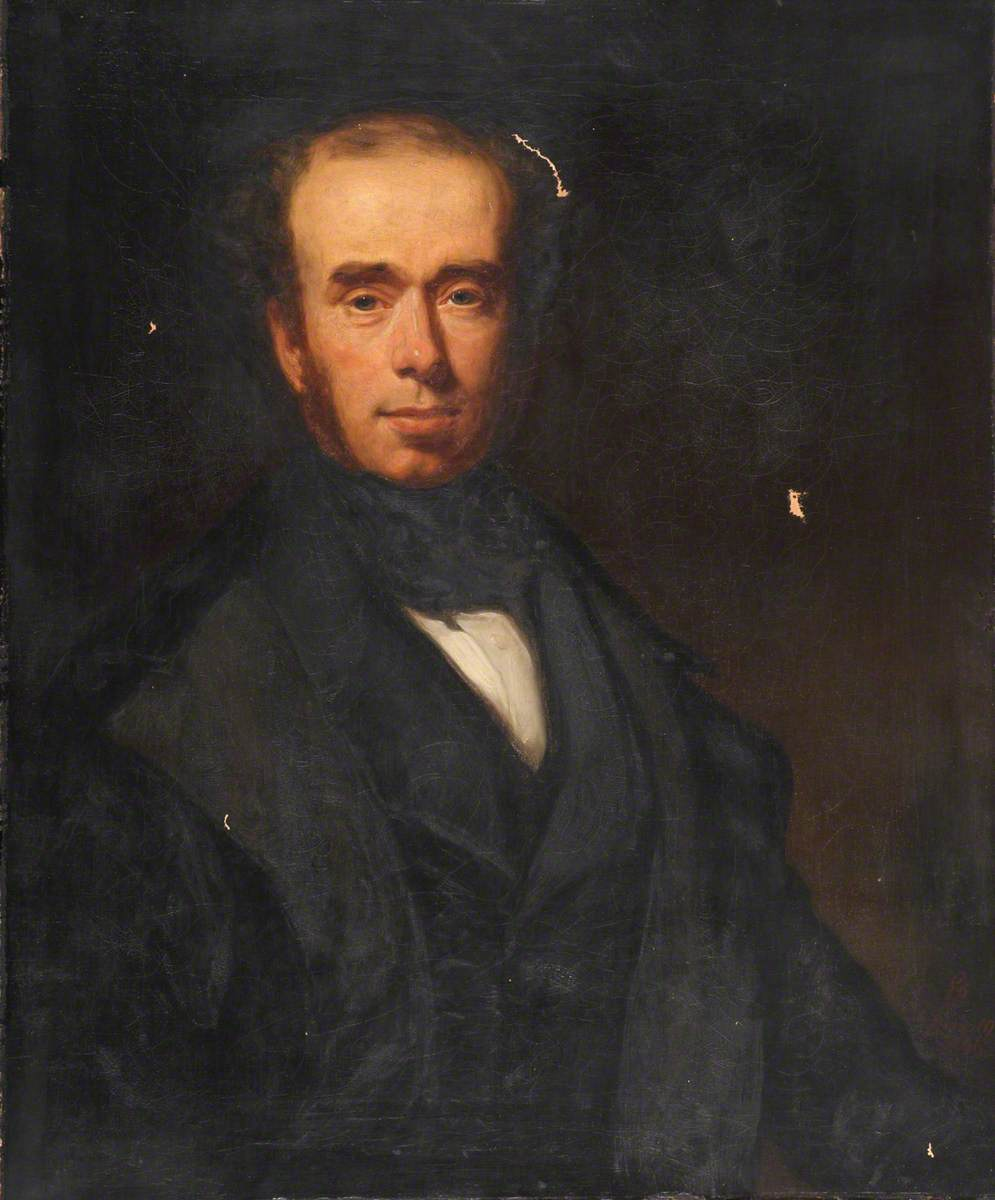
- Whitworth c. 1846
- Born: 21 December 1803; Stockport, Cheshire, England
- Died: 22 January 1887 (aged 83); Monte Carlo, Monaco
- Occupations: Engineer; entrepreneur; inventor; philanthropist
- Engineering career
- Institutions: Royal Society; Institution of Mechanical Engineers
- Significant advance: Whitworth standardised screw threads
- Awards: Albert Medal (1868)

Sir Joseph Whitworth, 1st Baronet (21 December 1803 – 22 January 1887) was an English engineer, entrepreneur, inventor and philanthropist. In 1841, he devised the British Standard Whitworth system, which created an accepted standard for screw threads. Whitworth also created the Whitworth rifle, often called the "sharpshooter" because of its accuracy, which is considered one of the earliest examples of a sniper rifle, used by some Confederate forces during the American Civil war.

Whitworth was created a baronet by Queen Victoria in 1869. Upon his death in 1887, Whitworth donated much of his fortune for the people of Manchester, with the Whitworth Art Gallery and Christie Hospital partly funded by Whitworth. Whitworth Street, Whitworth Park and the Whitworth Building in Manchester are named in his honour.

Whitworth's company merged with the W.G. Armstrong & Mitchell Company to become Armstrong Whitworth in 1897.

== Early life and education ==
Whitworth was born in John Street, Stockport, Cheshire, where the Stockport Courthouse is today. The site is marked by a blue plaque on the back wall of the courthouse. He was the son of Charles Whitworth, a teacher and congregational minister, and at an early age developed an interest in machinery. He was educated at Idle, near Bradford, West Riding of Yorkshire; his aptitude for mechanics became apparent when he began work for his uncle.

== Career ==
After leaving school Whitworth became an indentured apprentice to his uncle, Joseph Hulse, a cotton spinner at Amber Mill, Oakerthorpe in Derbyshire. The plan was that Whitworth would become a partner in the business. From the outset he was fascinated by the mill's machinery. Soon, he mastered the techniques of the cotton spinning industry. Even at this age, however, he noticed the poor standards of accuracy and was critical of the milling machinery. This early exposure to the mechanics of the industry forged in him the ambition to make machinery with much greater precision. His apprenticeship at Amber Mill lasted for a four-year term after which he worked for another four years as a mechanic in a factory in Manchester. He then moved to London where he found employment working for Henry Maudslay, the inventor of the screw-cutting lathe, alongside such people as James Nasmyth (inventor of the steam hammer) and Richard Roberts.

Whitworth developed great skill as a mechanic while working for Maudslay, developing various precision machine tools and also introducing a box casting scheme for the iron frames of machine tools that simultaneously increased their rigidity and reduced their weight.

Whitworth also worked for Holtzapffel & Co (makers of lathes used primarily for ornamental turning) and Joseph Clement. While at Clement's workshop he helped with the manufacture of Charles Babbage's calculating machine, the difference engine. He returned to Openshaw, Manchester, in 1833 to start his own business manufacturing lathes and other machine tools, which became renowned for their high standard of workmanship. He was elected to membership of the Manchester Literary and Philosophical Society on 22 January 1839. Whitworth is attributed with the introduction of the thou in 1844. In 1853, along with his lifelong friend, artist and art educator George Wallis (1811–1891), he was appointed a British commissioner for the New York International Exhibition. They toured around industrial sites of several American states, and the result of their journey was a report 'The Industry of the United States in Machinery, Manufactures and Useful and Applied Arts, compiled from the Official Reports of Messrs Whitworth and Wallis, London, 1854.'

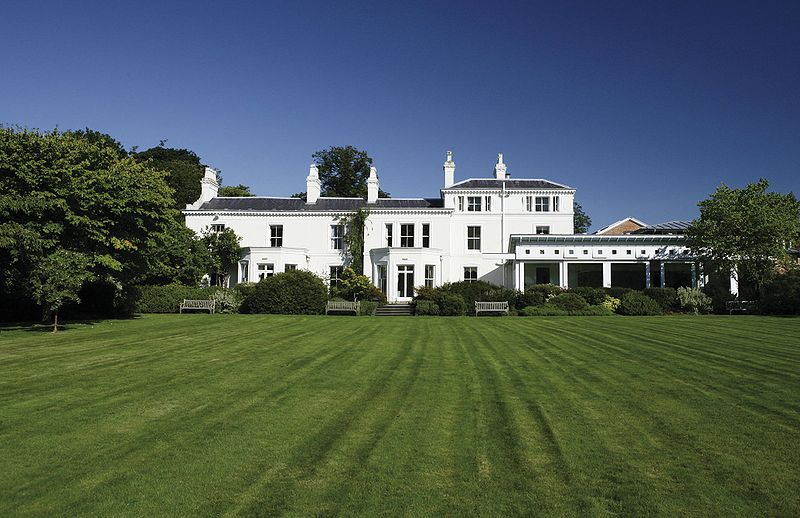
The Firs, now the Chancellors Hotel & Conference Centre

Whitworth received many awards for the excellence of his designs and was financially very successful. In 1850, then a President of the Institution of Mechanical Engineers, he built a house called 'The Firs' in Fallowfield in south Manchester designed by Edward Walters. In 1854 he bought Stancliffe Hall in Darley Dale, Derbyshire and moved there with his second wife Louisa in 1872. He supplied four six-ton blocks of stone from Darley Dale quarry, for the lions of St George's Hall in Liverpool. He was conferred with Honorary Membership of the Institution of Engineers and Shipbuilders in Scotland in 1859. He was elected a Fellow of the Royal Society (FRS) in 1857.

A strong believer in the value of technical education, Whitworth backed the new Mechanics' Institute in Manchester (later UMIST) and helped found the Manchester School of Design. In 1868, he founded the Whitworth Scholarship for the advancement of mechanical engineering. He donated a sum of £128,000 to the government in 1868 (approximately £6.5 million in 2010) to bring "science and industry" closer together and to fund scholarships. In 1869, Queen Victoria made Whitworth a baronet.

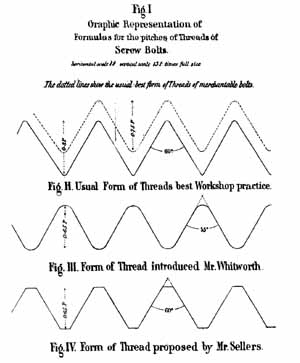
Graphic representation of formulas for the pitches of threads of screw bolts

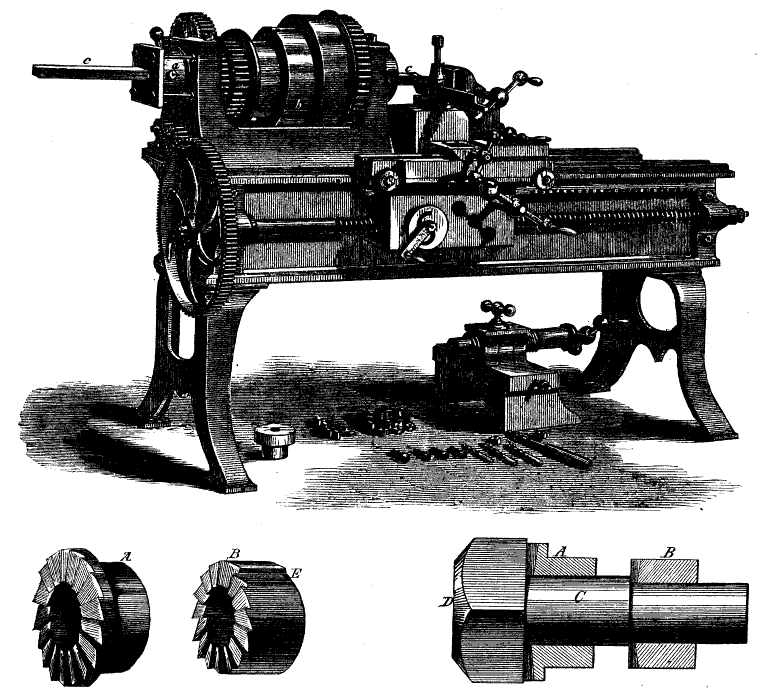
Screw-making machine from 1871

=== Accuracy and standardisation ===
Whitworth popularised the three-plates method for producing accurate flat surfaces (see Surface plate) during the 1830s, using engineer's blue and scraping techniques on three trial surfaces. Up until his introduction of the scraping technique, the same three-plate method was employed using polishing techniques, giving less accurate results. This led to an explosion of development of precision instruments using these flat-surface generation techniques as a basis for further construction of precise shapes.

His next innovation, in 1840, was a measuring technique called "end measurements" that used a precision flat plane and measuring screw, both of his own invention. The system had a resolution of one millionth of an inch (25 nm), as was demonstrated at the Great Exhibition of 1851. However, the absolute accuracy was limited to roughly 500 nm by practical problems such as thermal expansion.

In 1841 Whitworth devised a standard for screw threads with a fixed thread angle of 55° and having a standard pitch for a given diameter. This soon became the first nationally standardised system; its adoption by the railway companies, who until then had all used different screw threads, led to its widespread acceptance. It later became a British Standard, "British Standard Whitworth", abbreviated to BSW and governed by BS 84:1956.

=== Whitworth rifled musket ===
Whitworth was commissioned by the War Department of the British government to design a replacement for the calibre .577-inch Pattern 1853 Enfield, whose shortcomings had been revealed during the recent Crimean War. The Whitworth rifle had a smaller bore of 0.451 inches (11.455 mm) which was hexagonal, fired an elongated hexagonal bullet and had a faster rate of twist rifling [one turn in twenty inches] than the Enfield, and its performance during tests in 1859 was superior to the Enfield's in every way. The test was reported in The Times on 23 April as a great success. However, the new bore design was found to be prone to fouling and it was four times more expensive to manufacture than the Enfield, so it was rejected by the British government. An unspecified number of Whitworth rifles found their way to the Confederate states in the American Civil War, where they were called "Whitworth Sharpshooters". The rifles were capable of sub-MOA groups at 500 yards. It was often called the "sharpshooter" because of its accuracy, which is considered one of the earliest examples of a sniper rifle.

Queen Victoria opened the first meeting of the National Rifle Association at Wimbledon, in 1860 by firing a Whitworth rifle from a fixed mechanical rest. The rifle scored a bull's eye at a range of 400 yards (366 m).

=== Whitworth rifled cannon breech-loading artillery ===
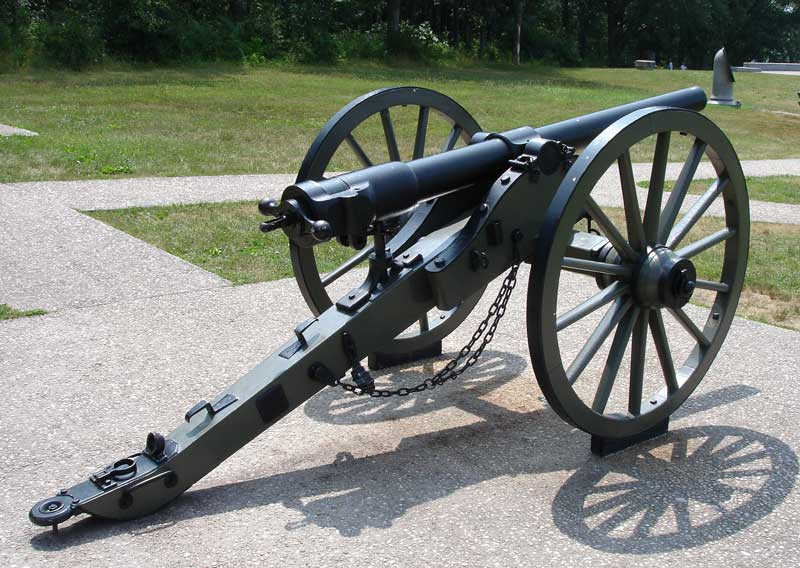
12-pounder Whitworth rifle

Whitworth also designed a large rifled breech-loading gun with a 2.75 inches (69.85 mm) bore, a 12 pounds 11 ounces (5.75 kg) projectile and a range of about 6 miles (10 km). The spirally-grooved projectile was patented in 1855. This was rejected by the British Army, who preferred the guns from Armstrong, but was used in the American Civil War.

While trying to increase the bursting strength of his gun barrels, Whitworth patented a process called "fluid-compressed steel" for casting steel under pressure and built a new steel works near Manchester. Some of his castings were shown at the Great Exhibition in Paris c. 1883.

== Whitworth scholarships ==
One of the most prominent forms of his generosity was his development of the Whitworth Scholarships with the Institution of Mechanical Engineers. Still running to this day, this provides financial opportunities for young engineers with a strong blend of academic and practical abilities. The Whitworth Scholarship programmes still exist with 10-15 scholarships being awarded each year. The scholarships are directed at outstanding engineers who, like Sir Joseph Whitworth, have excellent academic and practical skills and the qualities needed to succeed in industry, who are wishing to embark/or have already commenced on an engineering degree-level programme of any engineering discipline. As of 2018, the Scholarship pays up to £5,450 per year for up to four years in the case of a full time undergraduate. The handling and administration of the awards is now carried out by the Institution of Mechanical Engineers. Since 2006, a Whitworth Senior Scholarship was agreed by the trustees to support Postgraduate Research leading to a MPhil, PhD or EngD.

== Whitworth memorials ==
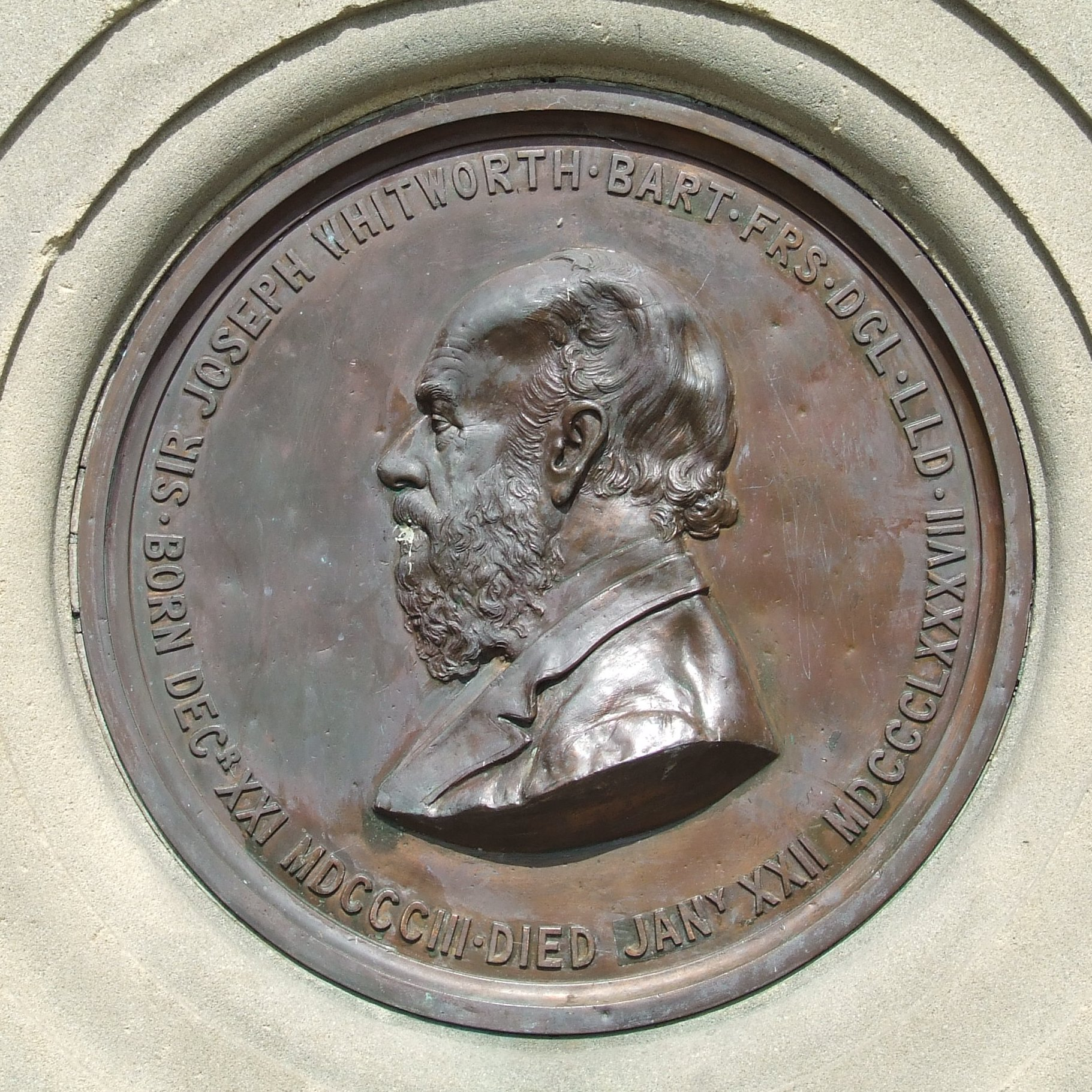
Plaque from the memorial in Whitworth Park, Darley Dale erected in 1894

Richard Copley Christie was a friend of Whitworth's. By Whitworth's will, Christie was appointed one of three legatees, each of whom was left more than half a million pounds for their own use, 'they being each of them aware of the objects' to which these funds would have been put by Whitworth. They chose to spend more than a fifth of the money on support for Owens College, together with the purchase of land now occupied by the Manchester Royal Infirmary. In 1897, Christie personally assigned more than £50,000 for the erection of the Whitworth Building, to complete the front quadrangle of Owens College. He was president of the Whitworth Institute from 1890 to 1895 and was much interested in the medical and other charities of Manchester, especially the Cancer Pavilion and Home, of whose committee he was chairman from 1890 to 1893, and which later became the Christie Hospital. Part of his bequest was used to construct the Whitworth Institute in Darley Dale.

The university's Whitworth Art Gallery and adjacent Whitworth Park were established as part of his will after his death. The nearby Whitworth Park Halls of Residence also bear his name, as does Whitworth Street, one of the main streets in Manchester city centre, running from London Road to the south end of Deansgate. Near 'The Firs' a cycleway behind Owens Park is called Whitworth Lane. In Darley Dale is another Whitworth Park. In recognition of his achievements and contributions to education in Manchester, the Whitworth Building on the University of Manchester is named in his honour.

== Whitworth Society ==
In 1923, the Whitworth Society was founded by Henry Selby Hele-Shaw, then president of the Institution of Mechanical Engineers to support all Whitworth Scholars and to promote engineering in the UK. The Society brings together those Whitworth Scholars who have benefited from Sir Joseph Whitworth's generosity.

== Death ==
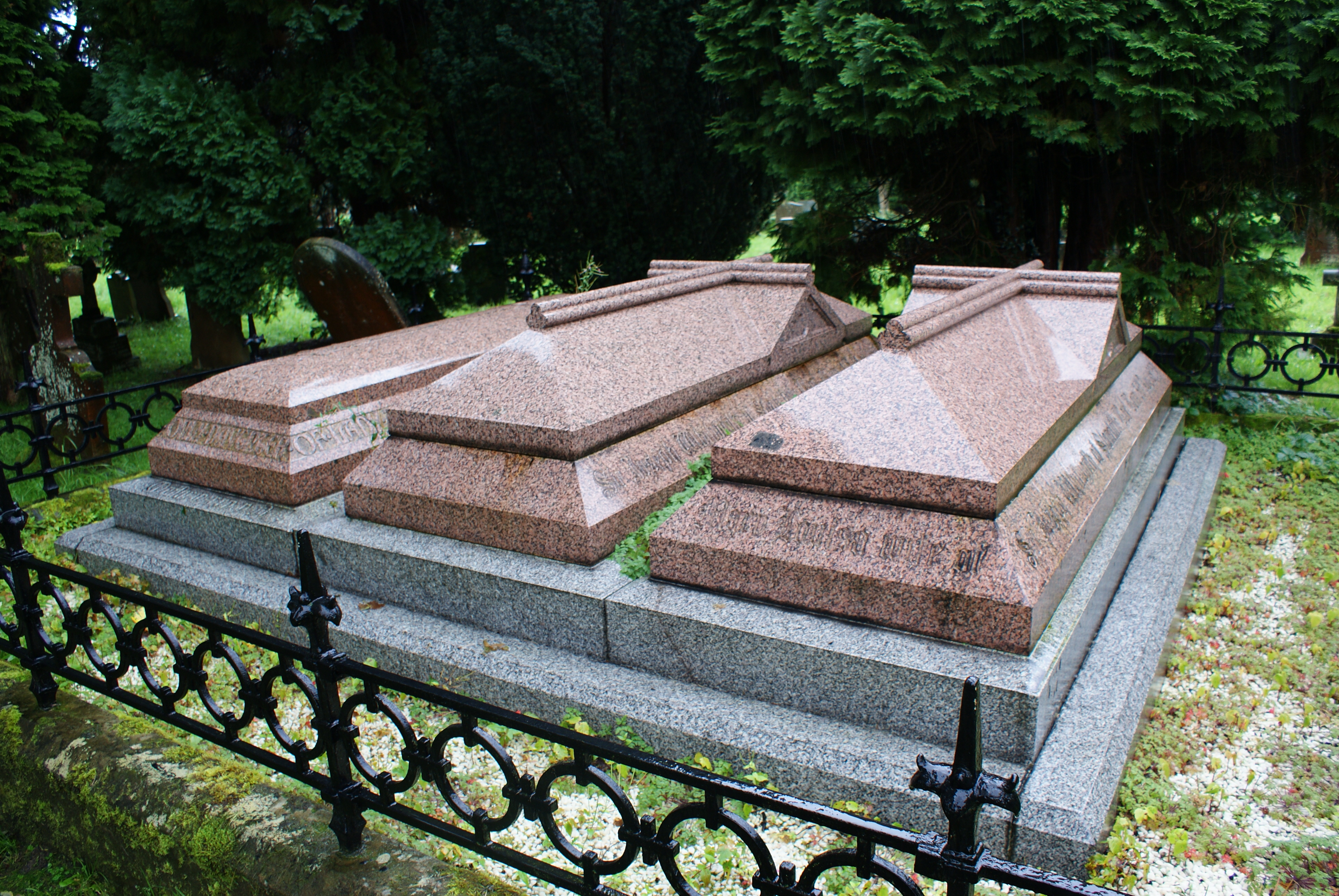
The grave of Sir Joseph Whitworth Bart. In the grounds of St Helen's Parish Church, Darley Dale, Derbyshire (Whitworth's grave is the central tomb)

In January 1887 at the age of 83, Sir Joseph Whitworth died in Monte Carlo where he had travelled in the hope of improving his health. He was buried at St Helen's Church, Darley Dale, Derbyshire. A detailed obituary was published in the American magazine The Manufacturer and Builder. He directed his trustees to spend his fortune on philanthropic projects, which they still do to this day.

Professional and academic associations
Preceded by William Fairbairn	President of the Institution of Mechanical Engineers; 1856–1857	Succeeded by John Penn
Preceded by Robert Napier	President of the Institution of Mechanical Engineers; 1865–1866	Succeeded by John Penn
Baronetage of the United Kingdom
New creation	Baronet (of The Firs); 1869–1887	Extinct
