= National Measurement and Regulation Office =

- Abbreviation: NMRO
- Formation: 1987
- Dissolved: 2016
- Type: Executive agency
- Region served: United Kingdom
- Parent organisation: Department for Business, Innovation and Skills
- Website: www.gov.uk/government/organisations/national-measurement-and-regulation-office

The National Measurement and Regulation Office (NMRO) was an executive agency of the UK Government's Department for Business, Innovation and Skills (BIS). Its function were to provide a measurement infrastructure which supports innovation, facilitates fair competition, promotes international trade and protects consumers and the environment.

== History ==
The agency was created as National Weights and Measures Laboratory (NWML) in 1987 from a reorganisation of the Standards Department when it moved from its previous location in central London to a new, purpose-built facility in Teddington which was officially opened by the Duke of Kent on the 9th of April 1987.

Until June 28, 2007, it was an agency of the Department of Trade and Industry. It then became part of the newly formed Department for Innovation, Universities and Skills. In 2009 an agency moved to Department for Business Innovation and Skills and until April 2015 was known as the National Measurement Office (NMO). In April 2015 NMO was renamed to National Measurement and Regulation Office and by 1 April 2016 it was merged with Better Regulation Delivery Office to form Regulatory Delivery in the former Department for Business Innovation and Skills.

Since July 2017, Regulatory Delivery has been a directorate in the newly created Department for Business, Energy and Industrial Strategy.

== Roles ==
The NMO and NMRO was responsible for the setting of the strategic direction of the measurement infrastructure, aligning policy and legislation, managing the national scientific and legal metrological activities and representing the UK in international activities on measurement. In addition, the NMO / NMRO acts as a National Enforcement Authority for a range of EU-based environmental legislation and carries out commercial activities which rely on measurement expertise.

=== Scientific metrology ===
The Agency had responsibility for the National Measurement System (NMS) until April 2015, which is the UK's national infrastructure of laboratories that are involved with the science and technology of measurement. It has responsibility for maintaining the national primary standards (mass, length, time, temperature etc.) and disseminating the associated measurements and technologies to the UK for trade and measurement purposes.

=== Legal metrology ===
The Agency was also responsible for examining and approving new measuring instruments and equipment which are ultimately intended for use in trade in order to establish their compliance with national legislation such as the Weights and Measures Act 1985 and relevant EU legislation. The agency also made available to manufacturers of such equipment a consultancy service, intended to be used throughout different stages of the equipment's development. They also provided calibration and testing services to both local authorities and private businesses, as well as training in aspects of legal metrology to national and international clients.

== See also ==
- National Physical Laboratory
- National Engineering Laboratory
- Laboratory of the Government Chemist
- International Organization of Legal Metrology
