= Sir St. John de Holt Elstub =

British mechanical engineer

- Born: 1915; Heywood, Lancashire, England
- Died: 1989 (aged 73–74)
- Education: Manchester University
- Occupation: Mechanical Engineer
- Scientific career
- Fields: Mechanical Engineering
- Workplaces: Institution of Mechanical Engineers

Sir St. John de Holt Elstub (1915 – 1989) was an English mechanical engineer and businessman.

== Life and education ==
He was born in 1915 in Heywood, Lancashire, England and attended Rugby School.

He obtained a BSc(Hons) in mechanical engineering from Manchester University in 1936.

He died in 1989. His obituary described him as an industrialist and an expert on aeroplanes.

== Career ==
After a brief internship with Vickers Armstrong, he secured a position with ICI working on design and maintenance.

From 1974 1o 1975, he served as the President of the Institution of Mechanical Engineers.

On 31st March 1974, he retired as chairman and managing director of Imperial Metal Industries.

=== Academic Career ===
He also became a member of the Engineering Industry Training Board and received an honorary degree from Aston University.

=== Military Career ===
During the Second World War, he joined the Royal Air Force and served as an operational bomber pilot and flying instructor. In 1943, he worked on the development of rocket motors and was involved in intelligence work on the V2 rocket.

== Awards and Honours ==
He became a Knight Bachelor at the 1970 Birthday Honours.

He was also awarded at the 1954 New Year Honours by Queen Elizabeth II.

== See also ==
- Imperial Chemical Industries
- Institution of Mechanical Engineers
