= Denning Pearson =

Former Chief Executive of Rolls-Royce Limited (1908–1992)

Sir James Denning Pearson FRAeS Wh.S.Sch (8 August 1908 – 1 August 1992) is a former Chief Executive of Rolls-Royce Limited.

== Early life ==
He was born in Bootle. His father died when he was eleven. He grew up in Cardiff.

He gained a First Class degree from Cardiff Technical College.

Pearson became a Whitworth Senior Scholar in 1930 having used his Scholarship to do steam turbine research at Metropolitan-Vickers and in 1985 became President of the Whitworth Society.

== Career ==
=== Rolls-Royce ===
He joined Rolls-Royce in 1932. During the Second World War, he was Chief Engineer at the R-R shadow factory in Glasgow, producing 150 Merlin engines a week.

He oversaw the expansion of Rolls-Royce into the jet aero-engine market in the 1960s.

== Personal life ==
He married Eluned Henry in 1932, and they had two daughters.

He was knighted in the 1963 New Year Honours. He became an FRAeS in 1964 and was awarded the Gold Medal of the Royal Aero Club in 1967. He died in the Amber Valley of Derbyshire.

Business positions
Preceded by	Chief Executive of Rolls-Royce Ltd; 1965-70	Succeeded by
Preceded by	Managing Director of the Aero Engine Division of Rolls-Royce Ltd; 1954-65	Succeeded by
