= Andrew Robertson (engineer) =

British mechanical engineer (1883–1977)

- Born: 30 January 1883
- Died: 22 October 1977 (aged 94)
- Education: University of Manchester
- Awards: FRS (1940) Whitworth Exhibitioner (1904)
- Scientific career
- Workplaces: University of Bristol

Andrew Robertson FRS D.Sc. MIMechE, MICE, Wh.Ex (30 January 1883 in Lancashire – 22 October 1977) was a British mechanical engineer.

== Education ==
He was the son of a marine engineer and was apprenticed at his father's works - J. Robertson & Sons in Fleetwood, Lancashire. He was a graduate of the University of Manchester, with a first-class honours degree, a Fairbairn engineering prize and a Whitworth Exhibitioner in 1904.

== Career and research ==
He was a demonstrator and tutor at the university. He investigated mild steel with Gilbert Cook. During World War I, he worked at the Royal Aircraft Establishment at Farnborough Airfield.

He was appointed Professor of Mechanical Engineering at the University of Bristol. In 1924, he was elected Principal of the college and dean of the faculty. A room is named for him at Bristol University.

== Awards and honours ==
Robertson was elected a Fellow of the Royal Society (FRS) in 1940. His candidature citation stated that he was "Distinguished for his experimental researches in problems relating to the strength of materials. Much of this work was done during the War (his study of the elastic properties of timber calls for special mention) and has not been published under his own name, but his papers on the drop of stress which occurs at yield (with G Cook), and on the strength of solid and tubular struts are classic. He has played a great part in the building up of the Engineering School at Bristol. Member of the Advisory Council DSIR".

Robertson was a Whitworth Exhibitioner in 1904, and later went on to be President of the Whitworth Society in 1947.

Professional and academic associations
| Preceded by Harry Ralph Ricardo | President of the Institution of Mechanical Engineers; 1945 | Succeeded by Oliver Vaughan Snell Bulleid |
