= Richard William Bailey =

Richard William Bailey FRS
- Born: 6 January 1885; Romford, Essex, England
- Died: 4 September 1957 (aged 72)
- Occupation: British mechanical engineer

Richard William Bailey FRS (6 January 1885 – 4 September 1957) was a British mechanical engineer and research engineer.

Bailey served his apprenticeship at the Stratford works of the London and North Eastern Railway Company, and during this time he gained a Whitworth Exhibition and a Whitworth Scholarship, as well as being made the first ‘Director’s Scholar’. He became in 1907 a college apprentice in electrical engineering at British Westinghouse's Trafford Park works.

Bailey was appointed in 1908 as a lecturer in mechanical engineering at Battersea Polytechnic, London and then in 1912 the Principal of Crewe Technical Institute (subsequently renamed Crewe University Technical College). In 1919, at the invitation of Arthur Percy Morris Fleming, he became head of the chemical, mechanical, and metallurgical sections of the Research Department of the British Westinghouse Electric Manufacturing Company (renamed, in September 1919, Metropolitan-Vickers Electrical Company). He continued as head of the sections until 1945 when he became a consulting research engineer. In 1924 he was an Invited Speaker at the ICM in Toronto.

He contributed to the progress ... in the initial steam temperatures of land power plant, by the development of the theory governing creep behaviour of metals and its application to design principles, and also by the introduction of improved steels for high-temperature service. He discovered the advantage obtained by leaving out nickel from the nickel—chromium— molybdenum steels then commonly used, and was responsible for the first chromium—molybdenum bolt steels for high-temperature service. His investigations of the influence of different carbide-forming elements led to the introduction of molybdenum—vanadium steel.

Of the Institution of Mechanical Engineers, he became an associate member in 1922, a full member in 1936, a vice-president in 1942, and the president serving for the year 1954. Bailey followed the IMechE presidency, with Presidency of the Whitworth Society in 1955, 50 years after becoming a Whitworth Scholar.

Dr. Bailey will probably be best remembered for his work on the behaviour of steels and similar materials under stress at high temperatures – work on which he was actively engaged from the pioneer days of 1924 until the time of his retirement. To this end he undertook, with skilfully devised apparatus, investigations involving accurate testing over long periods at high temperatures. As the testing proceeded and data became available, his judgement and intelligent extrapolation indicated fresh lines of investigation and gradually made possible a fuller understanding of the behaviour of materials under these conditions. At the same time, by repeated experiment in the modification of thermal treatment and of alloying elements he was responsible for the production of materials better suited for use under stress at elevated temperatures. His work was not by any means confined to the properties of materials. He made, for example, extensive studies of the performance and design of combinations of steam and internal combustion engines, especially for marine applications, and on this subject delivered the Eighteenth Andrew Laing Lecture to the North East Coast Institution of Engineers and Shipbuilders.

He was granted about 90 British patents and wrote over 35 papers.

== Honours and awards ==
- 1903 – Whitworth Exhibitioner
- 1905 – Whitworth Scholarship
- 1929 – Thomas Hawksley Premium from the Institution of Mechanical Engineers
- 1935 – Thomas Hawksley Gold Medal from the Institution of Mechanical Engineers
- 1949 – Fellow of the Royal Society
