= National Engineering Laboratory =

UK government agency

The National Engineering Laboratory (NEL) was originally one of several large government-funded public research laboratories in the UK, staffed by scientists and engineers of the Scientific Civil Service. Other such laboratories include the National Physical Laboratory (NPL), the Laboratory of the Government Chemist (LGC), the Building Research Establishment (BRE) and the Transport Research Establishment (TRL). NEL was established in 1948 at Thorntonhall under the name Mechanical Engineering Research Laboratory (MERL), in the village of the same name near East Kilbride, Glasgow, Scotland.

== History ==
The location was partly dictated by politics, since it was realised that Scotland did not have a UK public research establishment (in contrast to its defence establishments). There was also debate on whether the new laboratory would be an outpost of the prestigious NPL (which now has its main base in Teddington, just west of London), or have a separate identity. Eventually the latter course was taken with the new laboratory focussing on mechanical engineering research, complementing the work of the then CEGB laboratories in electrical engineering when the name was changed to NEL.

As NEL expanded, it moved to a large, purpose-built site in East Kilbride itself. Under the control of the Director, it was then part of the DTI. The 'lab' was organised into a number of subject-based divisions, including Creep Division, an important part of the UK effort to catalogue wear characteristics of materials, a Control Systems Division, Manufacturing Services Division, Fluid Power Division and Design Analysis Division. The last of these was in the forefront in the use of the emerging technology of Finite Element Analysis (FEA). Indeed, the growing need for quality-assurance in FEA led to the foundation of the National Agency for Finite Element Methods and Standards, now operating simply as NAFEMS.

Each building at NEL was named after a prominent engineer whose field was related to the focus of that division, so there was Maudsley Building, named after Henry Maudslay, famous for his invention of the slide-rest lathe amongst many other achievements, Bramah Building so called after Joseph Bramah owing to his contribution to hydraulic engineering, Rankine Building named after William John Macquorn Rankine which specialised in thermodynamics, Whitworth Building named after Joseph Whitworth immortalised after his work to unify standards for screw threads, one of the key stepping stones that paved the way for mass production.

The policy of the Thatcher Government was originally for the full privatisation of all of the government laboratories and the dismantling of NEL was undertaken by Lord Young. In practice, re-organisation has in some cases stopped short of a straight sale of these internationally important facilities, but NEL became part of the German-owned TÜV SÜD group in 1995. Along with the other national laboratories, some of which are still owned or controlled by the UK government, NEL now has a mixed portfolio of work from both government and private sectors. NEL holds the national standard for flow measurement, one of the most important roles it undertakes as part of the overall UK government science strategy. This is now in the remit of the Department for Innovation, Universities and Skills, working in part through the new National Measurement Office, which is itself an Executive Agency created in April 2009.

== Engineering apprenticeships ==
NEL operated an indentured apprentice training scheme and offered a wide range of skills for young engineers before being privatised ranging between light machining, heavy machining, fitting, electro-discharge-machining, jig and horizontal boring and in later years CNC machining, programming and introductions to FMS (flexible manufacturing system) and CAD/CAM facilities running KCurve on DEC/VAX mini computers. This work commenced around 1982-6 using raster scan, (green) monitors to visualise the programming, each known as workstations, (since the 'intelligence' was built into the desk, not the monitor) and the CAD CAM programs were still printed out on punched paper to be transferred in some cases into onboard RAM and in others read and implemented sequentially. Machines in use in the CAD / CAM department were Matchmaker 7000M vertical mill, Norton Variant with Fanuc control, Cincinnati horizontal mill that had (then) been recently retrofitted with Gould drives.

== Notable Directors ==
- Douglas George Sopwith FRSE from 1951 to 1967.

== Engineering sections operated in Maudsley Building between 1979 and 1989 ==
- Main workshop:
- Horizontal Boring (x3)
- Jig Boring (x3 De-Vleig)
- Floor mounted plane
- Pillar drill
- Small lathes
- Large lathes
- Lapping
- Sub workshops:
- Precision jig boring was carried out under temperature controlled conditions next to the metrology room.
- Heat treatment
- Grinding
- Sheet Metal
- Fitting

Work scheduling was carried out (innovatively for the time) using Work Analysis & Scheduling Program: W.A.S.P.
