= Ward Winer =

American engineer (1936–2025)

- Born: June 27, 1936; Grand Rapids, Michigan, U.S.
- Died: May 25, 2025 (aged 88)
- Education: University of Michigan
- Engineering career
- Institutions: Georgia Tech

Ward O. Winer (June 27, 1936 – May 25, 2025) was an American engineer who was the Regents' Professor Emeritus at Georgia Institute of Technology. He was an Elected Fellow of the American Association for the Advancement of Science, Society of Tribologists and Lubrication Engineers, American Society for Engineering Education and ASME.

== Life and career ==
Winer was born on June 27, 1936. He received his B.S. (1958) and M.S. (1959) degrees from the University of Michigan and his PhD (1964) from the University of Cambridge in the Cavendish Laboratory.

He was awarded the Tribology Gold Medal from the Institution of Mechanical Engineers (IMechE) in 1972. He received the Mayo D. Hersey Award from the American Society of Mechanical Engineers in 1986. He was elected to the National Academy of Engineering in 1988. He received the International Award from the Society of Tribologists and Lubrication Engineers in 1997. He was a member of the Distinguished Advisory Board for the International Tribology Council.

Winer died on May 25, 2025, at the age of 88.
