= Edmund Bruce Ball =

English hydraulic engineer

Edmund Bruce Ball FRSE (21 May 1873 – 17 June 1944) was an English hydraulic engineer. He specialised in the storage and distribution of water.

== Life ==
He was born in Thetford in Norfolk. He was educated in Thetford and then apprenticed as an engineer to Charles Burrell & Sons in that towns. His talent won him a scholarship to study engineering at Manchester Technical School. On completion of this apprenticeship in 1895, Ball was elected a Whitworth Exhibitioner and also received a Queen’s Prizeman for Science.

He had a very successful career, starting as Chief Designer for Benjamin Goodfellow & Co in Hyde, Manchester. Thereafter he served as Works Manager for Reavell & Co in Ipswich, Technical Director for San Georgio Co in Genoa, Technical Director for Samuel & Co Ltd in Shanghai and Manchuria, Works Manager at D Napier & Son in Acton, and Managing Director of Glenfield & Kennedy in Kilmarnock. His last position also gave him control of two subsidiary companies: British Pitometer and Hydrautomat.

He served as President of the Institution of Mechanical Engineers from 1939 to 1940, the same year he was President of the Whitworth Society. He was also President of the Institute of Water Engineers. He was an Honorary Member of the American Society of Mechanical Engineers.

He died of a heart attack at his home, Eldo House, in Monkton, Ayrshire in 1944.
