= Joseph Pope (academic) =

Sir Joseph Albert Pope (18 October 1914 – 24 March 2013) was a British engineer and academic administrator.

He was educated at King's College London (Engineering, 1938). He was an Assistant Lecturer in Engineering at Queen's University Belfast and the University of Manchester, then Senior Lecturer at the University of Sheffield from 1945 to 1949 and Professor of Mechanical Engineering at the University of Nottingham from 1949 to 1960. He later served as Vice-Chancellor of Aston University from 1969 to 1979. He was knighted in the 1980 Birthday Honours. He died on 24 March 2013 at the age of 98.

Pope had a lifetime association with the Whitworth Society acting as president in 1978 after becoming a scholar in 1935.
