= Institution of Mechanical Engineers =

Independent engineering society, headquartered in central London

- Established: 27 January 1847; 179 years ago
- Founder: George Stephenson
- Type: Professional association
- Professional title: Chartered Engineer
- Headquarters: 1 Birdcage Walk; London, England
- Region served: Worldwide
- Services: Professional accreditation Library
- Members: 110,000 (2025)
- Key people: President: Matt Garside (2025); Chief executive: Joann Passingham (since October 2025)
- Website: www.imeche.org

The Institution of Mechanical Engineers (IMechE) is an independent professional association and learned society headquartered in London, United Kingdom, that represents mechanical engineers and the engineering profession. With over 110,000 members in 140 countries, working across industries such as railways, automotive, aerospace, manufacturing, energy, biomedical and construction, the Institution is licensed by the Engineering Council to assess candidates for inclusion on its Register of Chartered Engineers, Incorporated Engineers and Engineering Technicians.

The Institution was founded at the Queen's Hotel, Birmingham, by George Stephenson in 1847. It received a Royal Charter in 1930. The Institution's headquarters, purpose-built for the Institution in 1899, is situated at No. 1 Birdcage Walk in central London.

== Origins ==
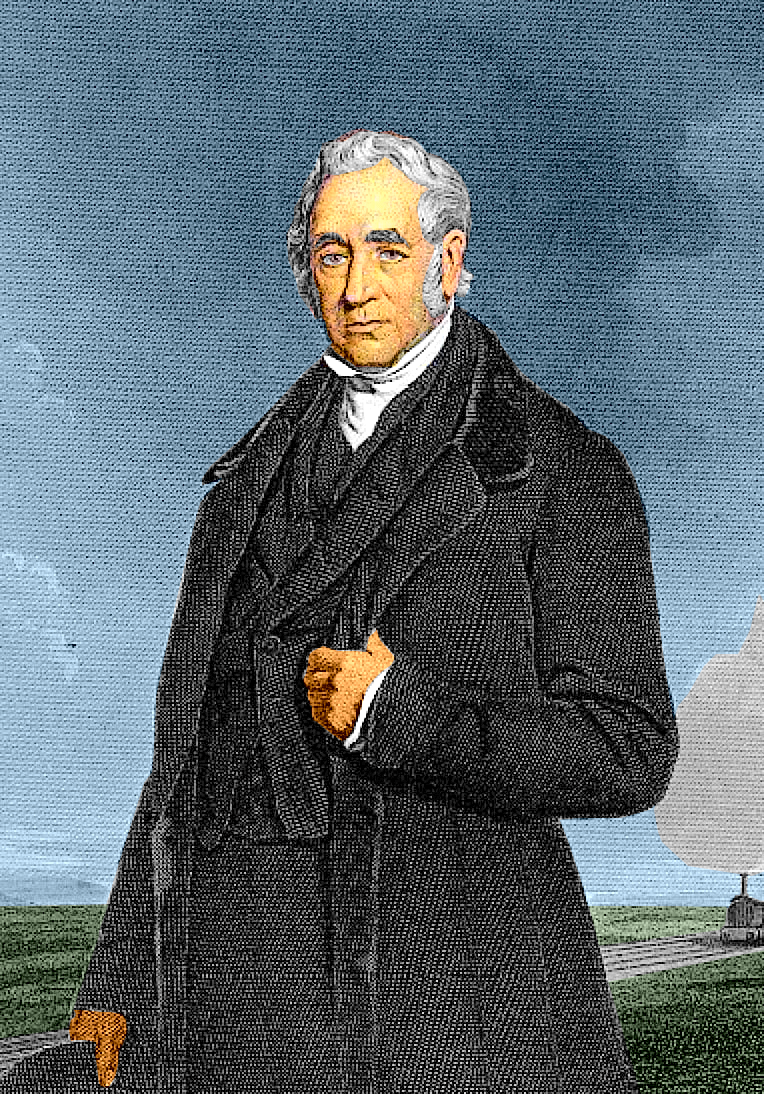
George Stephenson

Informal meetings are said to have taken place in 1846, at locomotive designer Charles Beyer's house in Cecil Street, Manchester, (Note: Pullin 1997, p. 2 quotes a leaflet from the opening of Birdcage Walk in 1899) or alternatively at Bromsgrove at the house of James McConnell, after viewing locomotive trials at the Lickey Incline. Beyer, Richard Peacock, George Selby, Archibald Slate and Edward Humphrys were present. Bromsgrove seems the more likely candidate for the initial discussion, not least because McConnell was the driving force in the early years. A meeting took place at the Queen's Hotel in Birmingham to consider the idea further on 7 October and a committee appointed with McDonnell at its head to see the idea to its inauguration.

The Institution of Mechanical Engineers was then founded on 27 January 1847, in the Queen's Hotel next to Curzon Street station in Birmingham by the railway pioneer George Stephenson and others. McConnnell became the first chairman. The founding of the Institution was said by Stephenson's biographer Samuel Smiles to have been spurred by outrage that Stephenson, the most famous mechanical engineer of the age, had been refused admission to the Institution of Civil Engineers unless he sent in "a probationary essay as proof of his capacity as an engineer". However, this account has been challenged as part of a pattern of exaggeration on Smiles' part aimed at glorifying the struggles that various Victorian mechanical engineers had to overcome in their personal efforts to attain greatness. Though there was certainly coolness between Stephenson and the Institution of Civil Engineers, it is more likely that the motivation behind the founding of the Institution of Mechanical Engineers was simply the need for a specific home for the growing number of mechanical engineers employed in the burgeoning railway and manufacturing industries.

Beyer proposed that George Stephenson become the Institution's first president in 1847, followed by his son, Robert Stephenson, in 1849. Beyer became vice-president and was one of the first to present papers to the Institution; Charles Geach was the first treasurer. Throughout the 19th and 20th centuries some of Britain's most notable engineers held the position of president, including Joseph Whitworth, Carl Wilhelm Siemens and Harry Ricardo. It operated from premises in Birmingham until 1877 when it moved to London, taking up its present headquarters on Birdcage Walk in 1899.

== Birdcage Walk ==
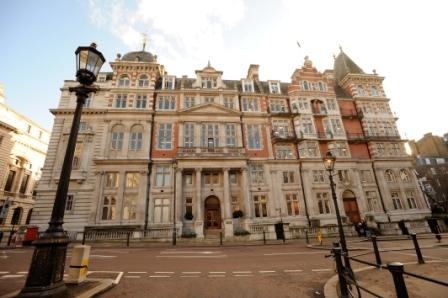
No. 1 Birdcage Walk

Upon its move to London in 1877 the Institution rented premises at No. 10 Victoria Chambers, where it remained for 20 years. In 1895 the Institution bought a plot of land at Storey's Gate, on the eastern end of Birdcage Walk, for £9,500. Architect Basil Slade looked to the newly-completed Admiralty buildings facing the site for inspiration. The building was designed in the Queen Anne, 'streaky bacon', style in red brick and Portland stone. Inside, there were several features that were state of the art for the time, including a telephone, a 54-inch fan in the lecture theatre for driving air into the building, an electric lift from the Otis Elevator Company, and a Synchronome master-clock, which controlled all house timepieces. In 1933 architect James Miller, who also designed the neighbouring Institution of Civil Engineers, remodelled the building, expanding the library and introducing electric lighting.

The building would go on to host the first public presentation of Frank Whittle's jet engine in 1945. In 1943 it became the venue for the Royal Electrical & Mechanical Engineers' planning of Operation Overlord and the invasion of Normandy.

Today No. 1 Birdcage Walk hosts events, lectures, seminars and meetings in 17 conference and meeting rooms named after notable former members of the Institution, such as Whittle, Stephenson and Charles Parsons.

The trustees are currently in the process of selling 1 Birdcage Walk.

== Membership grades and post-nominals ==
The following are membership grades with post-nominals:

- Affiliate: (no post-nominal) The grade for students, apprentices and those interested in or involved in mechanical engineering.
- AMIMechE: Associate Member of the Institution of Mechanical Engineers: this is the grade for graduates (of acceptable degrees or equivalents in engineering, mathematics or science)
- MIMechE: Member of the Institution of Mechanical Engineers. For those who meet the educational and professional requirements for registration as a Chartered Mechanical Engineer (CEng, MIMechE) and also as a Chartered Engineer (CEng) or Incorporated Engineer (IEng) or Engineering Technician (EngTech) in mechanical engineering.
- FIMechE: Fellow of the Institution of Mechanical Engineers. This is the highest class of elected membership, and is awarded to individuals who have demonstrated exceptional commitment to and innovation in mechanical engineering.

== Awards ==
The James Watt International Medal is an award for excellence in engineering established in 1937 by the Institution of Mechanical Engineers. It is named after Scottish engineer James Watt (1736-1819) who developed the Watt steam engine in 1781, which was fundamental to the changes brought by the Industrial Revolution in both his native Great Britain and the rest of the world.

The Whitworth Scholarship is awarded to a few promising engineers of the main engineering disciplines for the length of a degree course. On successful completion, they become Whitworth Scholars, with a medal and are entitled to use post-nominals Wh.Sch.. It was founded by Joseph Whitworth.

The Engineering Heritage Awards were created in 1984 to help recognise and promote the value of artefacts, locations, collections and landmarks of significant engineering importance.

The Energy, Environment and Sustainability Group Prize was created in 2017 to celebrate people who have taken "significant steps to bridge the gap between an unsustainable present and a more sustainable future."

Along with The Manufacturer, the Institution also runs The Manufacturer MX Awards, and Formula Student, the world's largest student motorsport event.

The Tribology Gold Medal is awarded each year for outstanding and supreme achievement in the field of tribology. It is funded from The Tribology Trust Fund. It was established and first awarded in 1972. As of 2017, it has been awarded to 39 individuals from 12 different countries.

Tribology Gold Medal Laureates
| Year | Awardee | Country |
|---|---|---|
| 2022 | Bo Persson | Sweden |
| 2021 | Jim Greenwood | UK |
| 2020 | Bharat Bhusan | USA |
| 2019 | Jean-Michel Martin | France |
| 2018 | Nicholas Spencer | Switzerland |
| 2017 | Kenneth Holmberg | Finland |
| 2016 | Friedrich Franek | Austria |
| 2015 | Shizu Wen | China |
| 2014 | Gwidon Stachowiak | Australia |
| 2013 | Jacob Israelachvili | USA |
| 2012 | Jacob Klein | Israel |
| 2011 | Qunji Xue | China |
| 2010 | Frank Talke | USA |
| 2009 | Irena Goryacheva | Russia |
| 2008 | Eustathios Ioannides | UK |
| 2007 | Koji Kato | Japan |
| 2006 | Roberto Bassani | Italy |
| 2005 | Dmitrii Garkunov | Russia |
| 2004 | Hugh Spikes | UK |
| 2003 | Yoshitsuga Kimura | Japan |
| 2002 | Nikolai Bushe | Russia |
| 2001 | Wilfried Bartz | Germany |
| 2000 | Lou Rozeanu | Israel |
| 1999 | Jean Frene | France |
| 1998 | Ernest Ravinowicz | USA |
| 1997 | Bo O. Jacobson | Sweden |
| 1996 | Virgiliu N. Constantinescu | Romania |
| 1995 | Stanislaw J. Pytko | Poland |
| 1994 | Jean-Marie Georges | France |
| 1993 | Ken Ludema | USA |
| 1992 | Herbert S. Cheng | USA |
| 1991 | Avtandil V. Chichinadze | USSR |
| 1990 | Toshio Sakurai | Japan |
| 1989 | Gerd Fleischer | Germany |
| 1988 | Maurice Godet | France |
| 1987 | Fujio Hirano | Japan |
| 1986 | Ward O. Winer | USA |
| 1985 | Kenneth L. Johnson | UK |
| 1984 | Heinz Peeken | Germany |
| 1983 | Alastair Cameron | UK |
| 1982 | Georgi V. Vinogradov | USSR |
| 1981 | Norimune Soda | Japan |
| 1980 | Mylon E. Merchant | USA |
| 1979 | Duncan Dowson | UK |
| 1978 | D. D. Fuller | USA |
| 1977 | Frederick T. Barwell | UK |
| 1976 | Robert L. Johnson | USA |
| 1975 | Igor V. Kragelski | USSR |
| 1974 | Mayo D. Hersey | USA |
| 1973 | Harmen Blok | Netherlands |
| 1972 | David Tabor | UK |

== Presidents ==
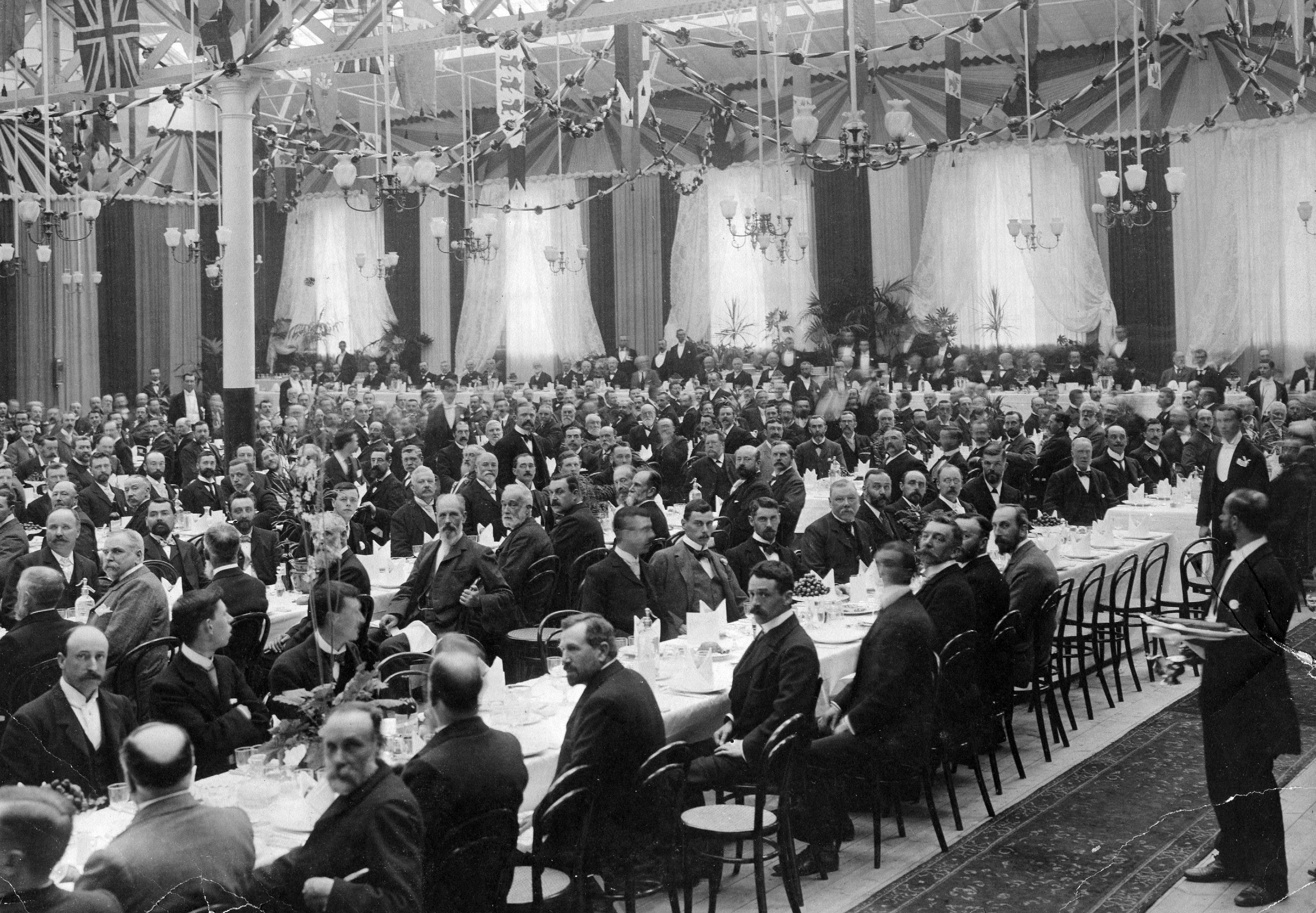
Annual dinner of the Institution in the carriage works of the Midland Railway at Derby in 1898. Samuel Johnson, the railway's Chief Mechanical Engineer, was the president.

As of 2020, there have been 135 presidents of the Institution, who since 1922 have been elected annually for one year. The first president was George Stephenson, followed by his son Robert. Prior to 2018, Joseph Whitworth, John Penn and William Armstrong were the only presidents to have served two terms.

Pamela Liversidge in 1997 became the first female president; Professor Isobel Pollock became the second in 2012 and Carolyn Griffiths became the third in 2017.

=== List of presidents ===
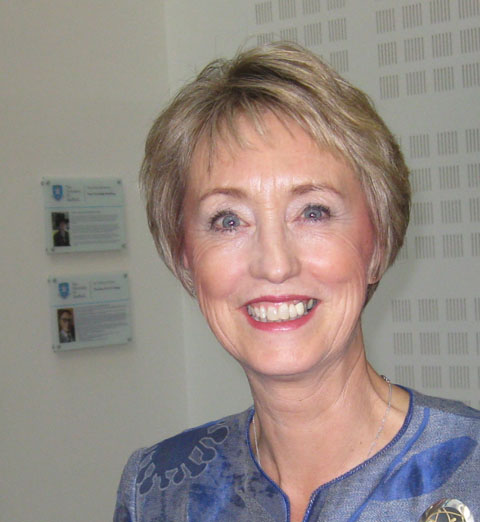
Pamela Liversidge, first female president (elected 1997, pictured in 2014)

| No | Years | Name | Sphere of influence |
|---|---|---|---|
| 1 | 1847–1848 | George Stephenson | railway engineer |
| 2 | 1849–1853 | Robert Stephenson | railway engineer, MP |
| 3 | 1854–1855 | William Fairbairn | manufacturer, trader, ironmaster, bridge, mill wheels, ships, later made baronet. |
| 4 | 1856–1857 | Joseph Whitworth (First term) | pioneer of machine tools, precision engineering |
| 5 | 1858–1859 | John Penn (First term) | Marine Steam engines |
| 6 | 1860 | James Kennedy | Marine engines and locomotives |
| 7 | 1861–1862 | William George Armstrong (First term) | Industrialist and inventor, primarily of armaments. Pioneer of domestic electricity |
| 8 | 1863–1865 | Robert Napier | Ship building and Marine engines |
| 4 | 1865–1866 | Joseph Whitworth (Second term) | pioneer of machine tools, precision engineering |
| 5 | 1866–1868 | John Penn (Second term) | Marine Steam Engines |
| 7 | 1868–1869 | William George Armstrong (Second term) | Industrialist and inventor, primarily of armaments. Pioneer of domestic electricity |
| 9 | 1870–1871 | John Ramsbottom | railway engineer |
| 10 | 1872–1873 | Carl Wilhelm Siemens | Metallurgist and electrical engineer |
| 11 | 1874–1875 | Frederick Joseph Bramwell | Steam engines and boilers |
| 12 | 1876–1877 | Thomas Hawksley | water and gas engineer |
| 13 | 1878–1879 | John Robinson | Steam Engines |
| 14 | 1880–1881 | Edward Alfred Cowper | Metallurgist, inventor of Cowper pot |
| 15 | 1882–1883 | Percy G. B. Westmacott | Hydraulic machinery |
| 16 | 1884 | Isaac Lowthian Bell | Iron master |
| 17 | 1885–1886 | Jeremiah Head | Steam powered agricultural machinery |
| 18 | 1887–1888 | Edward Carbutt | Iron and steel making |
| 19 | 1889 | Charles Cochrane | Iron and steel making |
| 20 | 1890–1891 | Joseph Tomlinson | Locomotive Superintendent |
| 21 | 1892–1893 | William Anderson | Bridges and factories |
| 22 | 1894–1895 | Alexander Kennedy | Professor of engineering, University College London |
| 23 | 1896–1897 | Edward Windsor Richards | Iron master |
| 24 | 1898 | Samuel Waite Johnson | Chief Mechanical Engineer, Midland Railway |
| 25 | 1899–1900 | William Henry White | Naval architect |
| 26 | 1901–1902 | William Maw | Editor, Engineering |
| 27 | 1903–1904 | Joseph Hartley Wicksteed | Testing machines and machine tools |
| 28 | 1905–1906 | Edward Pritchard Martin | Iron and steel making |
| 29 | 1907–1908 | Tom Hurry Riches | Chief engineer, Taff Vale Railway |
| 30 | 1909–1910 | John Aspinall | Chief Mechanical Engineer, Lancashire & Yorkshire Railway |
| 31 | 1911–1912 | Edward B. Ellington | Hydraulic machinery |
| 32 | 1913–1914 | Hay Frederick Donaldson | Royal Ordnance |
| 33 | 1915–1916 | William Unwin | oil engine research |
| 34 | 1917–1918 | Michael Longridge | Chief Engineer, Engine and Boiler Insurance Company; Artificial Limbs Department of the Ministry of Pensions |
| 35 | 1919 | Edward Hopkinson | Electric Traction. Died during year of office |
| 36 | 1920–1921 | Matthew Henry Phineas Riall Sankey | Military engineering, oil engines and wireless telegraphy |
| 37 | 1922 | Dr Henry Selby Hele-Shaw | Prof. Mechanical Engineering at Liverpool University |
| 38 | 1923 | John Dewrance | Inventor |
| 39 | 1924 | William Henry Patchell | Electricity supply |
| 40 | 1925 | Vincent Raven | Chief Mechanical Engineer, North Eastern Railway |
| 41 | 1926 | William Reavell | Compressor manufacturer |
| 42 | 1927 | Henry Fowler | Chief Mechanical Engineer, Midland Railway and London Midland & Scottish Railway |
| 43 | 1928 | Richard William Allen | Pumps and Marine equipment |
| 44 | 1929 | Daniel Adamson | Gears, cranes and cutting tools |
| 45 | 1930 | Loughnan St Lawrence Pendred | Editor of The Engineer |
| 46 | 1931 | Edwin Kitson Clark | Locomotive Engineer |
| 47 | 1932 | William Taylor | Lens Manufacturing |
| 48 | 1933 | Alan Ernest Leofric Chorlton | Pumps and Diesel engines, MP |
| 49 | 1934 | Charles Day | Steam and diesel engines |
| 50 | 1935 | Major-General Alexander Elliott Davidson | Mechanised military transport |
| 51 | 1936 | Nigel Gresley | Chief Mechanical Engineer, London & North Eastern Railway |
| 52 | 1937 | John Edward Thornycroft | Ship building and motor vehicle design |
| 53 | 1938 | David E Roberts | Iron and steel manufacture |
| 54 | 1939 | E. Bruce Ball | Motor Vehicles and hydraulic valves |
| 55 | 1940 | Asa Binns | Engineer |
| 56 | 1941 | William Stanier | Chief Mechanical Engineer, London, Midland & Scottish Railway |
| 57 | 1942 | Col Stephen Joseph Thompson | Boilers |
| 58 | 1943 | Frederick Charles Lea | Engineering Professor at Birmingham and Sheffield Universities |
| 59 | 1944 | Harry Ricardo | Automotive engineer. Founder, Ricardo Consulting |
| 60 | 1945 | Andrew Robertson | Prof. Mechanical engineering at Bristol University |
| 61 | 1946 | Oliver Bulleid | Chief Mechanical Engineer, Southern Railway |
| 62 | 1947 | Lord Dudley Gordon | Refrigeration engineering |
| 63 | 1948 | E. William Gregson | Marine engines |
| 64 | 1949 | H. J. Gough | Metal fatigue, engineering research |
| 65 | 1950 | Stanley Fabes Dorey | Chief engineer surveyor |
| 66 | 1951 | Arthur Clifford Hartley | Chief engineer, Anglo-Iranian Oil Co. inventor, Pluto and Fido |
| 67 | 1952 | David Randall Pye | Air Ministry research engineer |
| 68 | 1953 | Alfred Roebuck | Engineering metallurgy |
| 69 | 1954 | Richard William Bailey | High temperature steel and materials research |
| 70 | 1955 | Percy Lewis Jones | Marine engines and ship building |
| 71 | 1956 | Thomas Arkle Crowe | Marine Engines |
| 72 | 1957 | George Nelson | Chairman English Electric |
| 73 | 1958 | Robert Owen Jones | Aircraft Engineer |
| 74 | 1959 | Herbert Desmond Carter | Diesel Engines |
| 75 | 1960 | Owen Saunders | Prof. Mechanical Engineering Imperial College London |
| 76 | 1961 | Charles Hague | Chairman, Babcock & Wilcox |
| 77 | 1962 | John Hereward Pitchford | Internal Combustion engines |
| 78 | 1963 | Roland Curling Bond | Chief Mechanical Engineer, British Railways |
| 79 | 1964 | Frank Mason | Engineer in chief, Royal Navy |
| 80 | 1965 | Harold Norman Gwynne Allen | Power Transmission |
| 81 | 1966 | Lord Hinton of Bankside | Pioneer of nuclear power |
| 82 | 1967 | Hugh Graham Conway | Aero-engines and gas turbines |
| 83 | 1968 | Arnold Lewis George Lindley | Chairman of General Electric Company |
| 84 | 1969 | Donald Frederick Galloway | Manufacturing and machine tool engineer |
| 85 | 1970 | John Lamb Murray Morrison | Prof. Mechanical engineering Bristol University |
| 86 | 1971 | Robert Lickley | Aircraft engineer |
| 87 | 1972 | Lord Stokes | Chief executive, British Leyland |
| 88 | 1973 | John William Atwell | Steel industry and pump manufacture |
| 89 | 1974 | St. John de Holt Elstub | Metals |
| 90 | 1975 | Paul Thomas Fletcher | Process plan and nuclear power plant |
| 91 | 1976 | Ewen McEwen | Chief engineer, Lucas |
| 92 | 1977 | Hugh Ford | Professor of mechanical engineering, Imperial College London |
| 93 | 1978 | Diarmuid Downs | Internal combustion engines |
| 94 | 1979 | James Gordon Dawson | Chief Engineer, Shell |
| 95 | 1980 | Bryan Hildrew | Managing Director, Lloyd's Register of Shipping |
| 96 | 1981 | Francis David Penny | Director, National Engineering Laboratory |
| 97 | 1982 | Victor John Osola/Vaino Junani Osola | Process engineer, safety glass |
| 98 | 1983 | George Fritz Werner Adler | Research Director, British Hydromechanical Research Association |
| 99 | 1984 | Waheeb Rizk | Gas turbines at General Electric Company |
| 100 | 1985 | Philip Foreman | Aerospace engineer |
| 101 | 1986 | Bernard Crossland | Prof. Mechanical Engineering, Queen's University Belfast |
| 102 | 1987 | Oscar Roith | Chief Engineer, Department of Industry |
| 103 | 1988 | Cecil Charles John French | Internal combustion engines |
| 104 | 1989 | Roy Ernest James Roberts | Director, GKN |
| 105 | 1990 | Michael John Neale | Tribology |
| 106 | 1991 | Duncan Dowson | Prof of Fluid Mechanics, Leeds University, Tribology |
| 107 | 1992 | Thomas Diery Patten | Offshore engineering |
| 108 | 1993 | Anthony Albert Denton | Offshore engineering |
| 109 | 1994 | Brian Hamilton Kent | Design and engineering management |
| 110 | 1995 | Frank Christopher Price | Technical director |
| 111 | 1996 | Robert William Ernest Shannon | Inspection engineering |
| 112 | 1997 | Pamela Liversidge | Powder metallurgy |
| 113 | 1998 | John Spence | Metallurgy |
| 114 | 1999 | James McKnight | Automotive |
| 115 | 2000 | Denis E. Filer | Automotive |
| 116 | 2001 | Tony Roche | Railway |
| 117 | 2002 | John McDougall | MD of WS Atkins |
| 117 | 2003 | Chris Taylor | Tribology |
| 119 | 2004 | William Edgar | Offshore engineering |
| 120 | 2005 | Andrew Ives | Automobile engine electronics |
| 121 | 2006 | W. Alec Osborn | Automotive |
| 122 | 2007 | John Baxter | Nuclear engineer |
| 123 | 2008 | William M. Banks | Composite materials. Professor, University of Strathclyde |
| 124 | 2009 | Keith Millard | Marine |
| 125 | 2010 | John Wood | Automotive |
| 126 | 2011 | Roderick Smith | Rail engineer. Chief Scientific Adviser, Department for Transport 2012 - 2014. |
| 127 | 2012 | Isobel Pollock | Engineering management |
| 128 | 2013 | Patrick Kniveton | Nuclear Engineering - Rolls-Royce |
| 129 | 2014 | Group Captain Mark Hunt | RAF Engineer Officer, Engineering Management, Engineering Education |
| 130 | 2015 | Professor Richard Folkson | Chief Engineer of Ford of Europe, lecturer at University of Hertfordshire |
| 131 | 2016 | Jon Hilton | Kinetic energy recovery system pioneer, Deputy Chairman of Torotrak PLC |
| 132 | 2017 | Carolyn Griffiths | Head of Rail Accident Investigation Branch |
| 133 | 2018† | Geoff Baker | Oil and Gas |
| 116 | 2018† | Tony Roche (Second term) | Railway |
| 134 | 2019 | Joseph McGeough | Manufacturing |
| 135 | 2020 | Terry Spall | Automotive Engineer |
| 136 | 2021 | Peter Flinn | Manufacturing |
| 137 | 2022 | Philip Peel | Power Generation |
| 138 | 2023 | Giles Hartill | Technology |
| 139 | 2024 | Clive Hickman OBE | Manufacturing |
| 140 | 2025 | Matt Garside | Defence |

† Baker resigned in June 2018. The Institution's by-laws state that a casual vacancy for President shall be filled by appointing a Past President to the role; Tony Roche was elected and duly took up office for a second term in August of that year.

== Engineering Committees ==
The Institution of Mechanical Engineers has a number of committees that work to promote and develop thought leadership in different industry sectors. The Institution has 8 divisions: - Aerospace, Automobile, Biomedical Engineering Association, Construction & Building Services, Manufacturing Industries, Power Industries, Process Industries and Railway.

Biomedical Engineering Association (BmEA) aims to bring together key workers from both medicine and engineering to discuss the latest advances and issues, to enable networking among different industry leaders, and to promote the field of Medical Engineering, also known as Bioengineering or Biomedical Engineering, to government, healthcare professionals and the wider public. This committee offers:

- seminars, lectures and conferences every year;
- the Journal of Engineering in Medicine;
- the annual Student Project Competition.

The Railway Division was formed in 1969 when the Institution of Locomotive Engineers amalgamated with IMechE.

== Arms ==
Coat of arms of Institution of Mechanical Engineers
| Crest On a wreath of the colours upon a terrestrial globe a grey horse forcene Proper gorged with a coronet composed of four fleurs-de-lys with chain reflexed over the back Or. Escutcheon Sable between the points of a pair of calipers inverted Or a plate. Supporters On the dexter side a figure representing Archimedes holding in his exterior hand a pointer and on the sinister side a figure representing Vulcan resting his exterior hand upon a sledge hammer Proper. Motto Progress |

== See also ==
- Engineering
- James Watt International Medal
- Chartered Engineer
- Proceedings of the Institution of Mechanical Engineers

== Sources ==
- Pullin, John (1997). Progress through Mechanical Engineering. Quiller Press. ISBN 1-899163-28-X.
- Cragg, Roger (1997). Civil Engineering Heritage: Wales and West Central England: Wales and West Central England, 2nd Edition. Thomas Telford. ISBN 0-7277-2576-9.
- Watson, Garth (1988). The civils: the story of the Institution of Civil Engineers. Thomas Telford Limited. ISBN 978-0727703927.
- Awdry, Rev W (1981). "Bromsgrove and the Lickey Incline: the railway revolution". In Foster, John (ed.). Bygone Bromsgrove: an illustrated story of the town in days gone by. Bromsgrove Society. ISBN 9780950947143. OL 19606374M.
