= Legatee =

Person who receives portion of an estate

A legatee, in the law of wills, is any individual or organization bequeathed any portion of a testator's estate.

== Usage ==
Depending upon local custom, legatees may be called "devisees". Traditionally, "legatees" took personal property under will and "devisees" took land under will. Brooker v. Brooker (Tex. Civ.App., 76 S.W.2d 180, 183) asserts that "devisee" may refer to "those who take under will without any distinction between realty and personalty ... though commonly it refers to one who takes personal property" under a will.

== See also ==
- Beneficiary
