= List of people from Exeter =

This is a list of people from Exeter, a city in south-west England. People from Exeter are known as Exonians. This list is arranged chronologically by date of birth.

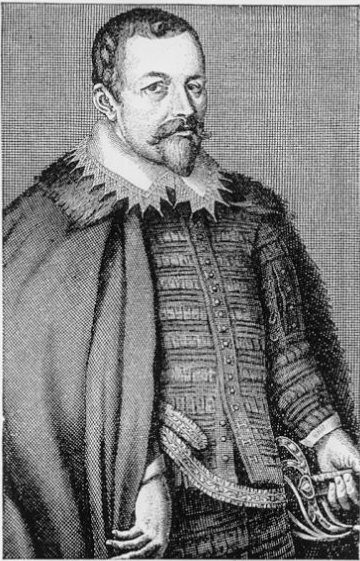
Thomas Bodley was born in Exeter in 1545

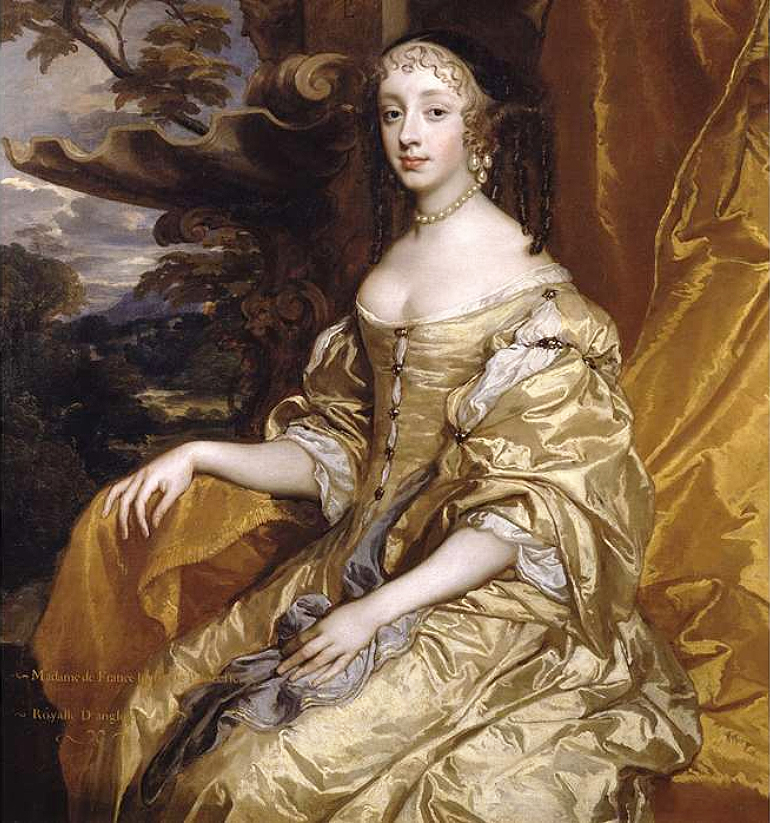
Henrietta Anne Stuart

== Born before 1701 ==
- Baldwin of Exeter (died 1190), Archbishop of Canterbury
- Joseph of Exeter (12th century), poet
- Robert Stone (1516–1613), composer and member of the Chapel Royal
- John Hooker (1525–1601), constitutionalist
- William Peryam (1534 – after 1603), lawyer.
- Sir Thomas Bodley (1545–1613), diplomat and founder of the Bodleian Library.
- Nicholas Hilliard (c. 1547–1619), portraitist.
- John Rainolds (1549–1607), Puritan scholar
- Richard Hooker (1554–1600), Anglican theologian
- William Hakewill (1574–1655), legal antiquarian
- George Hakewill (1578–1649), clergyman and author
- Matthew Locke (c. 1621–1677), Baroque composer.
- Henrietta Anne Stuart (1644–1670), daughter of King Charles I
- Peter King, 1st Baron King (1669–1734), lawyer, politician and Lord Chancellor.
- Thomas Yalden (1670–1736), poet
- Simon Ockley (1678–1720), orientalist.
- Eustace Budgell (1686–1737), writer
- Andrew Brice (1690–1773), printer and writer.

== Born 1701–1850 ==
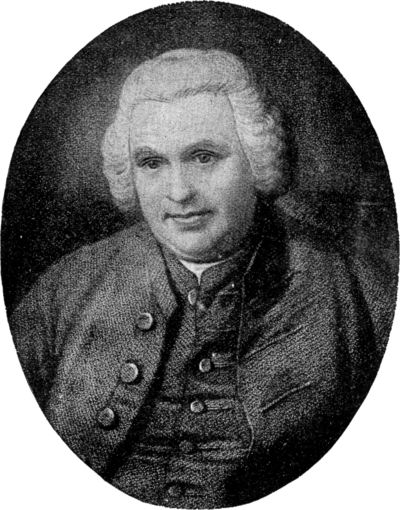
Thomas Mudge

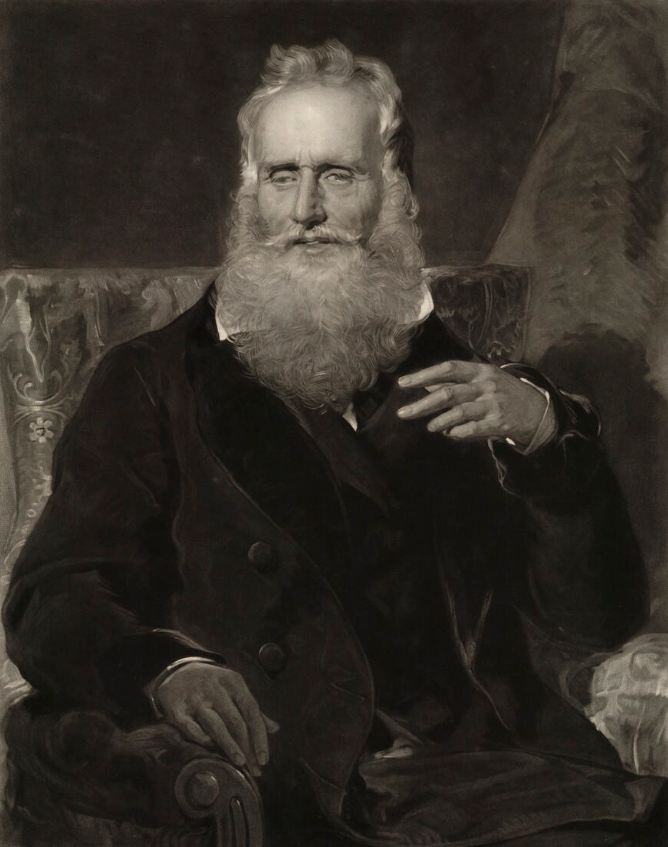
James Holman, 1849

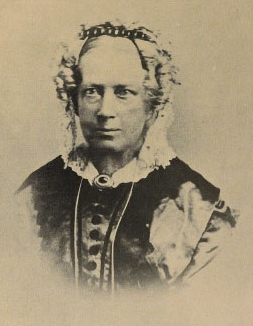
Mary Carpenter

- Thomas Hudson (1701–1779), portrait painter
- Benjamin Heath (1704–1766), classical scholar and bibliophile.
- Francis Hayman (1708–1776), Rococo artist.
- John Rowe (1715–1787), merchant and owner of ship involved in Boston Tea Party
- Thomas Mudge (1715-1794), horologist who was responsible for the Lever escapement mechanism.
- Samuel Stennett (1727–1795), Baptist minister and hymnwriter
- Richard Langdon (1729–1803), organist and composer.
- William Jackson (1730–1803), referred to as Jackson of Exeter, was an organist and composer.
- Robert Trewman (1738/39–1802), first proprietor of Trewman's Exeter Flying Post, published 1763–1917
- Sir Francis Baring, 1st Baronet (1740–1810), banker
- Richard Eastcott (baptised 1744–1828), Anglican clergyman and writer on music
- Robert Hawker (1753–1827), Anglican clergyman.
- David Collins (1756–1810), first governor of Van Diemens Land (Tasmania)
- John Stockham (1765–1814), naval officer
- Richard Parker (1767–1797), sailor and mutineer
- John Blackall (1771–1860), physician
- George Oliver (1781–1861), Catholic churchman and historian
- James Holman (1786–1857), noted blind traveller.
- Sir John Bowring (1792–1872), political economist and Governor of Hong Kong.
- Samuel Cousins (1801–1887), engraver.
- Mary Carpenter (1807–1877), educational and social reformer.
- Thomas Shapter (1809–1902), doctor and author of History of the Cholera in Exeter in 1832
- William Benjamin Carpenter (1813–1885), physiologist and naturalist.
- John Carne Bidwill (1815–1853), botanist, first director of the Royal Botanic Gardens, Sydney
- Lilly Martin Spencer (1822–1902), US painter
- Lavington Glyde (1824-1890), South Australian politician and accountant
- Henry Chadwick (1824–1908), journalist, "father of baseball"
- Alfred Merle Norman (1831–1918), clergyman and naturalist, born in Exeter
- Sabine Baring-Gould (1834–1924), writer, clergyman, antiquary and folklorist.
- Sir Harry James Veitch (1840–1924), horticulturist
- William John Seward Webber (1842–1919), sculptor
- William Kingdon Clifford (1845–1879), mathematician

== Born 1851–1950 ==
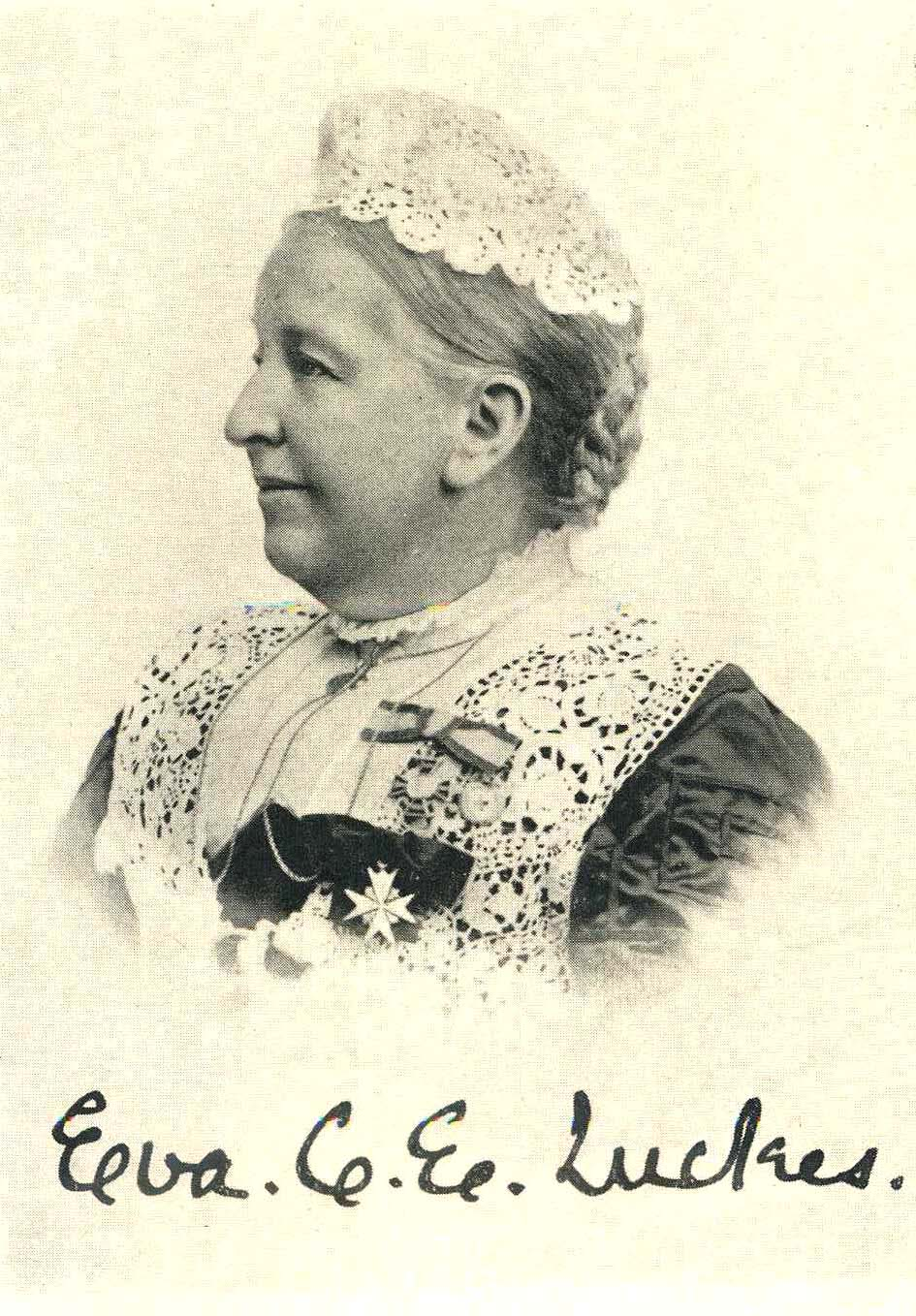
Eva Luckes, 1914

- Eva Luckes (1854–1919), matron of The London Hospital 1880–1919, pioneer of training for nurses
- Theodore Bayley Hardy (1863–1918), Army chaplain and VC
- Fred Karno (1866–1941), comedy pioneer and impresario
- Irene Vanbrugh (1872–1949), actress
- Herbert Augustine Carter (1874–1916), army officer and VC
- William Temple (1881–1944), Archbishop of Canterbury
- Ernest Kennaway (1881–1958), pathologist who suggested a link between smoking and lung cancer
- Gordon Steele (1891–1981), recipient of the Victoria Cross
- Primrose Pitman (1902–1998), artist
- W. G. Hoskins (1908–1992), historian of the English landscape
- Cliff Bastin (1912–1991), Arsenal and England footballer
- John Manners (1914–2020), English cricketer and Royal Navy officer; oldest living first-class cricketer
- Tommy Cooper (1921–1984), comedian born in Caerphilly but living in Exeter from the age of three
- Denis Pereira Gray (born 1935), physician
- Tony Burrows (born 1942), pop singer
- Linda Bar-On (born 1945), Israeli quilt artist
- Sarah Harrison (born 1946), novelist
- Peter Rutley (born 1946), former professional footballer
- Doug Finley (1946–2013), Canadian Senator and principal operational strategist of the Conservative Party of Canada

== Born since 1950 ==
- Clare Morrall (born 1952), novelist
- John Scott (born 1954), England rugby union international
- Beth Gibbons (born 1965), singer with Portishead
- Ben Nealon (born 1966), actor
- Toby Buckland (born 1969), gardener, TV presenter and author
- Michael Caines (born 1969), chef and restaurateur
- Mark Harmsworth (born 1969), Washington State Representative, USA
- Jane Griffiths (born 1970), poet and literary historian
- Chris Martin (born 1977), lead singer of Coldplay
- Mathew Theedom (born 1977), cricketer
- Dominic Wood (born 1977), TV presenter
- Matthew Goode (born 1978), actor
- David Lye (born 1979), cricketer
- Scott C Shephard (born 1979), music executive
- Jim Causley (born 1980), folk singer
- Stuart Hooper (born 1981), rugby union player
- Rebecca Worthley (born 1981), singer/songwriter
- Trevor Anning (born 1982), cricketer
- Bradley James (born 1983), actor
- Kate Bushell (born 1983), victim of a high-profile child murder in the city in 1997, her murder remains unsolved as of 2026
- Tim Shaw (born 1984), American football player for Tennessee Titans
- Harry Treadaway (born 1984), actor
- Ben Aldridge (born 1985), actor
- Liam Tancock (born 1985), world champion swimmer
- Aaron Jarvis (born 1986), Wales rugby union player
- Liam Lewis (born 1986), cricketer
- Kour Pour (born 1987), artist
- James Yeoburn (born 1987), theatre producer and entrepreneur
- Liam Sercombe (born 1990), professional footballer
- Luke Newberry (born 1990), actor
- Joe Launchbury (born 1991), England rugby union international
- Harry Tincknell (born 1991), professional racing driver, 24 Hours of Le Mans LMP2-class winner
- Tristan Evans (born 1994), drummer in The Vamps
- Matt Grimes (born 1995), footballer for Swansea City A.F.C.
- Dom Bess (born 1997), cricketer
- Ben Green (born 1997), cricketer
- Thomas Cameron (born 1999), classical singer, radio host
- Tom Lammonby (born 2000), cricketer
- Ethan Ampadu (born 2000), footballer for Leeds United F.C and Wales national football team
- Jem Hepworth (born 2000), racing driver
- James Theedom (born 2007), cricketer
- Xia Vigor (born 2009), actress for ABS CBN

== See also ==
- List of people associated with the University of Exeter
- List of Bishops of Exeter
