= List of people from Devon =

Devon is a county in South West England. The demonym of Devon is Devonian. This list is arranged alphabetically by surname.

A more complete listing is at Category:People from Devon.

== A ==
- Rhoda Anstey (1865–1936), suffragist, tax resister and physical education teacher in Birmingham
- Henry Avery (1659 – after 1696), pirate

== B ==
- Charles Babbage (1791–1871), inventor
- Ralph Bagnold (1896–1990), geologist, desert explorer, and soldier
- Baldwin of Exeter (d. 1190), Archbishop of Canterbury
- W. N. P. Barbellion: pen name of Bruce Frederick Cummings, diarist
- Sir Francis Baring, 1st Baronet (1740–1810), banker
- Sabine Baring-Gould (1834–1924), scholar, clergyman, novelist and antiquary
- Sue Barker (born 1956), tennis player and television presenter
- Kenneth Barnes (1878–1957), director of RADA
- Cliff Bastin (1912–1991), Arsenal and England footballer
- Phil Beer (born 1953), musician and composer (born at Exminster)
- Matt Bellamy (born 1978), guitarist, pianist, and vocalist of rock band Muse
- Samuel Bellamy (1689-1717), sailor, pirate, ship captain
- John Bidlake (1755–1814), clergyman, author, artist
- John Carne Bidwill (1815–1853), botanist, first Director, Royal Botanic Gardens, Sydney
- Margaret Bingham (1740–1814), countess, painter and writer
- Sir Thomas Bodley (1545–1613), diplomat and founder of the Bodleian Library at Oxford
- Zachary Bogan (1625–1659), English scholar
- Saint Boniface (c. 675–754), patron saint of the Netherlands and Germany
- Sir John Bowring (1792–1872), political economist and Governor of Hong Kong
- Henry de Bracton (d. 1268), jurist
- Eustace Budgell (1686–1737), writer
- Tony Burrows (born 1942), pop singer
- Richard Burton (1821–1890), explorer and linguist

== C ==
- Michael Caines (b. 1969), chef and restaurateur
- Edward Capern (1819–1894), poet
- Mary Carpenter (1807–1877), educational and social reformer
- William Benjamin Carpenter (1813–1885), physiologist and naturalist
- Pearl Carr (1921-2020), entertainer and runner up in Eurovision 1959, born in Exmouth
- Raymond Cattell (1905–1998), psychology pioneer
- Jim Causley (b. 1980, Heavitree), folk singer and radio presenter
- Jimmy Cauty (b. 1956), pop musician
- Henry Chadwick (1824–1908), journalist, "the father of baseball"
- Sir Francis Chichester (1901–1972), aviator and sailor
- Agatha Christie (1890–1976), novelist
- Lady Mary Chudleigh (1656–1710), early feminist and poet
- William Kingdon Clifford (1845–1879), mathematician
- Eleanor Coade (1733–1821), inventor of Coade stone
- Lily Cole (b. 1988), supermodel and actress
- Samuel Taylor Coleridge (1772–1834), poet
- David Collins (1756–1810), first Governor of Van Diemens Land (Tasmania)
- Peter Cook (1937–1995), comedian, born in Torquay
- William Cookworthy (1705–1780), pharmacist and industrialist
- Tommy Cooper (1921–1984), comedian, was born in Caerphilly but lived in Exeter from the age of 3
- William Johnson Cory (1823–1892), educator and poet
- Samuel Cousins (1801–1887), engraver
- Edmund Crispin (1921–1978), novelist and composer
- Lisa Cross (b. 1978), IFBB professional bodybuilder
- William Crossing (1847–1928), author
- Richard Cosway (1742-1821), miniature painter
- Thomas Cameron (born 1998), classical singer/radio host

== D ==
- Thomas Daley (born 1994), diver
- Sharron Davies (born 1962), Olympic swimmer and television presenter
- David Rodgers (born 1952), Former TSW Presenter and Radio Station owner
- Roger Deakins (born 1949), cinematographer
- Kristian Digby (b. 1977 Torquay. d. 2010 London), television presenter
- Sir Francis Drake (c. 1540–1596), sailor
- Thomas d'Urfey (1653–1723), dramatist

== E ==
- Charles Lock Eastlake (1793–1865), artist
- Marc Edworthy (born 1972), footballer
- Samuel Eyles Pierce (1746–1829), preacher, theologian, and Calvinist divine
- Henry Every (c. 1653/59–?), pirate
- Sir Richard Eyre (born 1943), theatre, television, and film director

== F ==
- Percy Fawcett (1867–1925), archaeologist and explorer
- Michael Foot (1913–2010), Labour politician
- John Ford, Jacobean playwright best known for his tragedy 'Tis Pity She's a Whore
- Trevor Francis (born 1954), professional footballer
- Dawn French (born 1957), comedian
- George Friend (born 1987), professional footballer for Middlesbrough F.C.
- Luke Friend (born 1996), X Factor finalist

== G ==
- John Gay (1685–1732), poet and dramatist
- Geraint (died 710), King of Dumnonia
- Beth Gibbons (b. 1965), singer with Portishead
- Humphrey Gilbert (c. 1539–1583), sailor and explorer
- John Glanville (1542–1600), MP and High Court Judge
- Elizabeth Godwin, first female officer of The Life Guards
- Matthew Goode (b. 1978), actor in such movies as Brideshead Revisited and Watchmen
- Dan Gosling (born 1990), English footballer
- Philip Henry Gosse (1810-1888), naturalist
- Francis Carruthers Gould (1844–1925), caricaturist and politician
- William Greening, politician
- Richard Grenville (1542–1591), sailor and explorer

== H ==
- George Hakewill (1578–1649), clergyman and author
- William Hakewill (1574–1655), legal antiquarian
- Carl Harbord (1908–1958), film actor
- Theodore Bayley Hardy (1863–1918), Army chaplain and VC
- Miranda Hart (b. 1972), actress and comedian
- Henry Haversham Godwin-Austen (1834-1923), English topographer, geologist, naturalist and surveyor
- Harriet Hawkins (b. 1980), professor of cultural geography
- Matt Harvey, poet
- Benjamin Haydon (1786–1846), painter and writer
- Francis Hayman (1708–1776), Rococo artist
- Oliver Heaviside (1850–1925), mathematician
- Nicholas Hilliard (c. 1547–1619), portraitist
- Christopher Hitchens (1949–2011), writer, journalist, and literary critic
- James Holman (1786–1857), noted blind traveller
- John Hooker (c. 1527–1601), constitutionalist
- Richard Hooker (1554–1600), Anglican theologian
- W. G. Hoskins (1908–1992), historian of the English landscape
- Ben Howard (b. 1987), folk musician
- Dominic Howard (b. 1977), musician, drummer of rock band Muse
- Thomas Hudson (1701–1779), portrait painter
- Rosie Huntington-Whiteley (b. 1987), model

== J ==
- Bradley James (born 1983 or 1984), actor
- Gabrielle Jeffery (1886–1940), suffragist and one of the founders of the Catholic Women's Suffrage Society (1911–1923), predecessor of the St Joan's International Alliance
- Thomas B. Jeffery (1845–1910), automotive pioneer who emigrated to the United States
- Richard Roach Jewell (1810–1891), architect
- Joseph of Exeter (12th century), poet

== K ==
- Fred Karno (1866–1941), comedy pioneer and impresario
- Benjamin Kennicott (1718–1783), Hebrew scholar
- Peter King, 1st Baron King (1669–1734), Lord Chancellor
- Charles Kingsley (1819–1875), novelist
- Steve Knightley (born 1954), musician (born in Poole, Dorset)
- George Knight-Bruce (1853–1896), clergyman becoming Bishop of Bloemfontein, then translated to be the first Bishop of Mashonaland

== L ==
- Seth Lakeman (b. 1977), folk musician (Born in Frome, Somerset to Cornish parents)
- William Elford Leach (1791–1836), scientist
- Jon Lee (b. 1982 Newton Abbot), singer with S Club 7
- Zion Lights (b. 1984), writer
- Chris Lintott (b. 1980), scientist and writer
- Matthew Locke (ca. 1621–1677), baroque composer.

== M ==
- Chris Martin (b. 1977), singer with Coldplay
- Jane McGrath (1966–2008), co-founder of the McGrath Foundation and late wife of fast bowler Glenn
- Liam Mooney (b. 1972), entrepreneur
- Penny Mordaunt (b. 1973), politician
- Clare Morrall (b. 1952), novelist
- Ian Mortimer (b. 1967), historian
- Dean Moxey (b. 1986), professional footballer for Crystal Palace
- Jerri Mumford (1909–2002), British-born Canadian servicewoman during World War II
- Dermot Murnaghan (b. 1957), TV journalist and news presenter

== N ==
- Harrison Dax Nash (b. 1988), humanitarian
- Clara Neal (1870–1936), teacher, school headmistress and suffragette leader in Wales
- Ben Nealon (b. 1966), actor
- Luke Newberry (b. 1990), actor

== O ==
- Simon Ockley (1678–1720), orientalist
- Ponsonby Ogle (1855–1902), British writer and journalist

== P ==
- Richard Parker (1767–1797), sailor and mutineer
- James Parsons (1705–1770), physician, antiquary and author
- Jo Pavey (b. 1973), Olympic Runner
- William Peryam (1534–after 1603), lawyer
- St Petroc (c. 468 – c. 564), saint
- Sergio Pizzorno (b. 1980), guitarist from the band Kasabian
- John Prince (1643–1723), clergyman and biographer
- Poker Alice (1851–1930), American frontier gambler
- John Skinner Prout (1805–1876), writer and artist in Tasmania
- Samuel Prout (1783–1852), watercolour artist

== R ==
- John Rainolds (1549–1605), Puritan scholar
- Sir Walter Raleigh (1552–1618), sailor and writer
- Chris Read (b. 1978), English test cricket wicket-keeper
- Joshua Reynolds (1723–1792), influential English painter
- Peter Richardson (b. 1952), actor, comedian, director and writer
- Bertram Fletcher Robinson (1870–1907), author, journalist, editor and sportsperson
- Philip Hutchins Rogers (1794–1853), artist
- Sir Henry Rosewell (1590–1656), Puritan, of Forde Abbey, adventurer of the Dorchester Company
- John Rowe (1715–1787), merchant and owner of ship involved in the Boston Tea Party
- John "Jack" Russell (1795–1883), eponymous dog-breeder and a founder member of the Kennel Club
- Lobsang Rampa (1910–1981), author and plumber

== S ==
- Robert Falcon Scott (1868–1912), RN officer and Antarctic explorer
- Sir Nicholas Slanning (1606–1643), MP, Royalist soldier in the English Civil War
- Wayne Sleep (b. 1948), dancer and choreographer
- Lilly Martin Spencer (1822–1902), US painter
- Samuel Stennett (1727–1795), Baptist minister and hymnwriter
- John Stockham (1765–1814), naval officer
- Robert Stone (1516–1613), composer and member of the Chapel Royal.
- Henrietta Anne Stuart (1644–1670), daughter of King Charles I
- Anthony Sullivan (b. 1969), TV commercial pitchman, and co-star of the show Pitchmen on Discovery Channel
- Sam Simmonds (b. 1994), Exeter Chiefs and England rugby union player

== T ==
- Liam Tancock (b. 1985), Olympic swimmer
- William Temple (1881–1944), Archbishop of Canterbury
- Clive Toye (b. 1932), first general manager of New York Cosmos

== V ==
- Irene Vanbrugh (1872–1949), actress
- Phil Vickery (b. 1976), rugby union player
- David Vine (1935–2009), TV sports presenter

== W ==
- Snowy White (b. 1948), guitarist
- William John Wills (1834–1861), explorer
- Chris Wolstenholme (b. 1978), musician, bass player for the band Muse
- Rebecca Worthley (b. 1981), singer-songwriter
- Rosemary West (b. 1953), serial killer with Fred West
- Josh Widdicombe (b. 1983), comedian

== Y ==
- Thomas Yalden (1670–1736), poet

== See also ==
- List of people from Exeter
- List of people from Plymouth
