= List of people from Plymouth =

People from the English city of Plymouth are known as Plymothians, or less formally as Janners. The definition of Janner is described as a person from Devon, deriving from Cousin Jan (the Devon form of John), but more particularly in naval circles anyone from the Plymouth area. The Elizabethan navigator and slave trader, Sir Francis Drake was born in nearby town of Tavistock and was the mayor of Plymouth. He was the first Englishman to circumnavigate the world and was known by the Spanish as El Draco meaning "The Dragon" after he raided many of their ships. He died of dysentery in 1596 off the coast of Panama. In 2002 a mission to recover his body and bring it to Plymouth was allowed by the Ministry of Defence. Antarctic explorers Robert Falcon Scott and Frank Bickerton both lived in the city.

Many artists have originated in Plymouth. Joshua Reynolds, the famous 18th-century portrait painter and the first president of the Royal Academy was born in Plympton, and more recently artists have included Beryl Cook whose paintings depict the culture of Plymouth and Robert Lenkiewicz, whose paintings looked at themes such as: vagrancy, sexual behaviour and suicide, lived in the city from the 1960s until his death in 2002. In addition, George Passmore of Turner Prize winning duo Gilbert & George was born in the city. Famous politicians Michael Foot and David Owen are from Plymouth and notable athletes include swimmer Sharron Davies, diver Tom Daley, dancer Wayne Sleep, and footballer Trevor Francis. Other past residents include composer Ron Goodwin, and journalist Angela Rippon. Humanitarian Harrison Dax Nash is also from Plymouth.

== People ==
Image	Name	Born	Died	Notability	Notes
	Sir John Hawkins	1532	1595	Naval commander and administrator, merchant, navigator, shipbuilder and privateer	Born 1532 Plymouth, died 12 November 1595 at sea off Puerto Rico.
	Sir Francis Drake	1540	1596	First English person to circumnavigate the world	Born in Tavistock and was the mayor of Plymouth. He died of dysentery off the coast of Panama and was slipped overboard inside a lead casket.
William Cookworthy	William Cookworthy	1705	1780	Pharmacist/Industrialist	Born in Kingsbridge, Devon. Pioneered porcelain manufacture in Plymouth.
	William Bligh	1754	1817	Naval Officer and Colonial Administrator	Born in Plymouth baptised in St Andrew's Church
	Sir George Arthur, 1st Baronet	1784	1854	Colonial governor	Spent most of his time in British colonies.
(no known portrait)	William Elford Leach	1791	1836	Naturalist at the British Museum	Virtually solely responsible for the modernisation of British zoology in the early 19th century, which laid the foundations for Charles Darwin.
	Jonathan Nash Hearder	1809	1876	Electrical engineer	Born and died in Plymouth. Notable for the development of the induction coil.
	Graham Gore	c1809	after June 1847	Naval officer and polar explorer	Lost during the Franklin Expedition to find the Northwest Passage
	William Henry Wills	1810	1880	Journalist and newspaper editor	Close friend of Charles Dickens, Wills was the subeditor of Household Words and All the Year Round.
	Robert Julian Scott	1861	1930	Emeritus Professor of Engineering, Canterbury University, New Zealand	Notable for the creation of New Zealand's first indigenous steam buggy in 1881 and the development of Canterbury University's school of engineering. Cousin of Robert Falcon Scott.
	Robert Falcon Scott	1868	1912	Antarctic explorer	Died in central Antarctica. His body was found eight months later.
	Isaac Foot	1880	1960	President of the Liberal Party	He was president in 1947.
	Frank Bickerton	1889	1954	Antarctic explorer	Moved to Plymouth at the age of six and lived there until 1920.
	Robert Victor Walling	1890	1976	Soldier, journalist, and poet	Born and educated in Plymouth. In peacetime he worked as a journalist with Plymouth-based newspaper The Western Daily Mercury. He was also a member of Gorseth Kernow.
	Joe Symonds	1894	1953	Boxer	Born in Plymouth, Symonds held the British, European and IBU World flyweight boxing titles in the 1910s.
	Ralph Bagnold	1896	1990	Explorer of North Africa and soldier	Born in Devonport
	Stanley Bate	1911	1959	Composer and pianist	Born in the Milehouse suburb of Plymouth, Bate composed concertos and symphonies. He received more recognition internationally than at home.
	Michael Foot	1913	2010	Leader of the Labour Party	Son of Isaac Foot.
	Richard Greene	1918	1985	Film and television actor	Born in Plymouth died in Norfolk aged 66. A Matinée idol appearing in over 40 films, he is perhaps best known for his role in the TV series The Adventures of Robin Hood.
	Duncan Scott-Ford	1921	1942	Merchant seaman	Hanged during World War II for treachery to the Germans.
	Ron Goodwin	1925	2003	Composer	Born in Plymouth
	Beryl Cook	1926	2008	Comical artist	Born in Epsom, Surrey.
	Bob Downes	1937	Alive	Avant-garde jazz musician	Born in Plymouth 22 July 1937
	Len Heard	1942	Alive	Professional darts player	Born in Plymouth 18 January 1942
	Chris Dawson	1952	Alive	Businessman and founder of the retail chain The Range	Born in Plymouth 15 February 1952
Giles Tremlett	Giles Tremlett	1962	Alive	Journalist/Author	Born in Plymouth, Giles Tremlett is a historian, author and journalist known for his publications regarding Spain.
	Mark Holden	21 September 1962 (age 63)	Alive	Canadian actor and producer	Born in Plymouth on 21 September 1962
	Lewis Pugh	5 December 1969 (age 56)	Alive		First person to undertake a long distance swim in every ocean of the world.
	Liam Mooney	18 May 1972 (age 54)	Alive	Entrepreneur	Born in Gosport, Hampshire
	Lisa Cross	4 April 1978 (age 48)	Alive	IFBB professional bodybuilder	Born in Rochdale, Greater Manchester
	Laura James	25 January 1987 (age 39)	Alive	Professional wrestler	Wrestled for Impact Wrestling and Dramatic Dream Team; former 5-time DDT Ironman Heavymetalweight Champion. Also appeared in the Netflix series GLOW. Married to American professional wrestler Joey Ryan.
	Kate Nesbitt	21 April 1988 (age 38)	Alive	Medical Assistant in the Royal Navy	Raised in Whitleigh, the first female recipient of the Military Cross in the Royal Navy, for bravery during the War in Afghanistan in March 2009.
	Tom Daley	21 May 1994 (age 32)	Alive	Olympic diver	BBC Sports Personality of the Year Young Personality in 2007.
	Rūta Meilutytė	19 March 1997 (age 29)	Alive	Olympic swimmer	Won gold in the 100 meter breaststroke at the 2012 Summer Olympics, in London. Meilutyté is also the world record holder in the 100 breaststroke (short course), and the 50, and 100 meter breaststroke (long course)
	Florence Given	19 November 1999 (age 20)	Alive	Author and social activist	Florence Given is a British feminist queer illustrator and social activist, born in Plymouth and now based in London. She wrote Women Don't Owe You Pretty and is known for her popular slogan designs which address social issues surrounding sexuality.

== See also ==
- Category:People from Plymouth, Devon
- List of people from Devon
