= George Baker (organist) =

English musician

George Baker (1773?–1847) was an English musician.

== Early life ==
George Baker was probably born in 1773. At the time of his matriculation at Oxford in 1797, he stated his age to be twenty-four, thus dating his birth. However, later in life, he claimed to be born in 1750 because he imagined himself much older than he was. After many years of research, family historians stated he was born in 1771.

He was born in Exeter and received his first musical instruction from his mother's sister, becoming, it is said, proficient on the harpsichord at age seven. He was next placed under Hugh Bond and William Jackson of Exeter, remaining there until his 17th year, when he came to London under the patronage of the Earl of Uxbridge. His patron caused him to become a pupil of Cramer and Dussek. During his residence in London, he performed his celebrated "Storm"' at the Hanover Square Rooms, meeting with the approbation of Dr. Burney.

== Career ==
In 1794 or 1795, he was appointed organist of St Mary's Church, Stafford. He seems to have matriculated and taken the degree of Music Bachelor's in 1797 at Oxford, but he appears not to have taken his doctor's degree during his residence at Stafford, for in the Corporation Books of that town he is called 'Mr. Baker'. The same documents hint at a state of affairs that can hardly have been satisfactory. On 5 March 1795, an entry stats 'that the organist be placed under restrictions as to the use of the organ, and that the mayor have a master key to prevent him having access thereto.' And on 16 July in the same year 'it is ordered that Mr. George Baker be in future prohibited from playing the piece of music called "The Storm"'. The inhabitants of Stafford did not, therefore, concur in Dr. Burney's opinion as to the excellence of this piece, apparently its composer's chef d'œuvre. During the following years, several entries indicate that Baker habitually neglected his duties, and on 19 May 1800, the entry is 'Resignation of Baker.'

In 1799, he married the eldest daughter of the Rev. J. Knight of Milwich. If he ever took the degree of Music Doctor, it must have been in or before 1800, as after that year the Oxford registers were carefully kept, but contain no such entry. From 1763 to 1800 musical degrees were systematically omitted from the record. In the published copies of several glees, printed about this time and dedicated to the Earl of Uxbridge, he is called 'Mus. Bac. Oxon.;' thus, his claim to the more distinguished title is at least problematic.

In 1810, he was appointed organist at All Saints', Derby. Finally, in 1824, he accepted a similar situation at Rugeley, where he remained until his death on 19 February 1847. After 1839 his duties were undertaken by a deputy. He produced many compositions, which are now forgotten. He is said to have been handsome, with a fair complexion, and generous to the point of improvidence. In his later years, the eccentricities, which probably gave rise to a large proportion of his difficulties with the Stafford authorities, increased, and he was moreover afflicted with deafness.
