= John Travers (composer) =

English composer

John Travers (ca. 1703 – June 1758) was an English composer who held the office of Organist to the Chapel Royal from 1737 to 1758. Before filling several parochial posts in London he had been a choir boy at St. George's Chapel, Windsor, and a pupil of Johann Christoph Pepusch.

== Life ==
He received his early musical education in the choir of St. George's Chapel, Windsor. With the support of Henry Godolphin, he was apprenticed to Maurice Greene. He afterwards studied with John Christopher Pepusch, and copied, according to Charles Burney, his style. On Pepusch's death Travers was bequeathed some of his musical library.

About 1725 Travers became organist of St. Paul's, Covent Garden, and afterwards of Fulham church. On 10 May 1737 he succeeded Jonathan Martin as organist of the Chapel Royal, a post which he held until his death in 1758. Among his pupils was Jackson of Exeter.

== Works ==
His church music (for example the extended anthem Ascribe unto the Lord) was used into the nineteenth century.

- The whole Book of Psalms for one, two, three, four, or five voices, with a thorough bass for the harpsichord (1750?)
- Twelve Voluntaries for Organ or Harpsichord, London (1769).

Among his secular compositions are his Eighteen Canzonets, the words being from Matthew Prior.
