= Peeling Onions =

Painting by Lilly Martin Spencer from ca. 1852

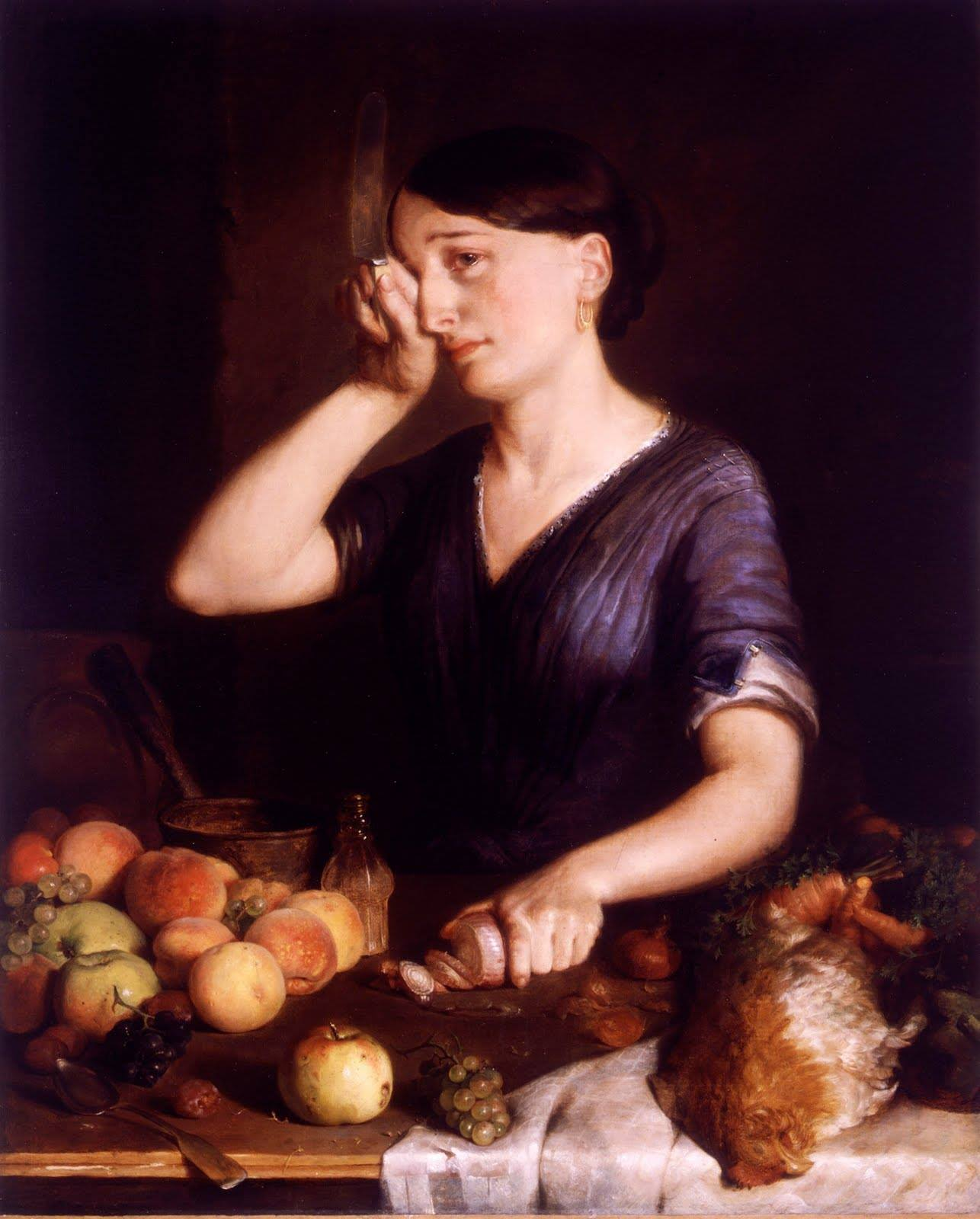
- Peeling Onions, by Lilly Martin Spencer, ca. 1852, the Memorial Art Gallery, Rochester, NY, acquired in June, 1988
- Artist: Lilly Martin Spencer
- Year: c. 1852
- Medium: Oil on canvas
- Dimensions: 91 cm × 74 cm (36 in × 29 in)
- Designation: Public domain
- Location: Memorial Art Gallery, Rochester, New York

Peeling Onions is an oil painting at the Memorial Art Gallery in Rochester, NY, by American genre painter Lilly Martin Spencer in 1852. Spencer is recognized for her ability to convey the nuance in domestic life with contextual and narrative details. Though the composition of Peeling Onions is easily recognizing as portraits, the meticulous detail and the scenic moment the painter poke fun at suggest the subject operates in and against sentimental culture, which gains her popularity in 1850s.

== Description ==
Peeling Onions is an oil painting on canvas, measuring 36 by 29 inches. It's a realistic portrayal of woman peeling onions in the dark kitchen, fulfilling daily domestic task. Yet from her pensive facial expression and hesitating gesture, the painting suggest a deeper sorrow of female's household labor, as well as an interrogation about her identity in mid-nineteenth century when the patriarchal ideology of "separate sphere" is dominant.

The painting endorsed a combination of nativist sentiment and European technique derived from seventeenth-century Dutch and Flemish paintings and contemporary works by artists trained at the Dilsseldorf Academy in Germany. The still life in the front presents to the viewer with a sharp glimpse of naturalism, and the trompe l'oeil effect by the protruding spoon indicate painter's study of seventeenth-century Dutch art.

Peeling Onions embodies Lilly Martin Spencer's embrace of domesticity. By introducing dichotomies, such as one eye with tears and the other cover by the hand holding a knife, the demure dress in contrast to the muscular forearms, she allows her work for multiple and contradictory messages.

== Background ==
Lilly Martin Spencer is a widely recognized female genre painter who grew up in Ohio. Her work endorses "domestic feminism," affirms and appreciates female's labor within the household, and their leadership role as well as their dominance in the legitimate sphere. Spencer attempted to elevate female's role within the family by highlighting "the reciprocity, circularity, and family love." She claimed women's place as social guide for men in the social life, as well as their moral superiors.

Peeling Onions mimicked Lilly Martin Spencer's life experience as the family's economic support since her husband abandoned his occupation to support Spencer as her business manager. Her dilemma in finding the balance between her role as an artist, the housewife, and the mother echoed her works in blending the vulnerability in female's domestic work.

== Analysis ==
According to the art critic Elizabeth L. O’Leary, Peeling Onions contained something beyond the portrait of the woman. By depicting her crying while fulfilling the domestic work, it not only revealed the growth in the awareness of female equality in country's public and professional life, but also how it presents as a challenge to their traditional role in family.

She also noted the woman in Peeling Onions is a portrait of the artist's own maid. From surviving letters of the artist, the message contained indicating these domestic employees during her early years in New York as companionable. They helped her temporarily freed from daily chores so she can work on her paintings, and became the subject of her composition.

Some critics suggested that Spencer's focus on women's activities in the kitchen was a natural result of her experience as a mother. The restrictive standards of behavior for women defined by the "cult of true womanhood" limited even an ambitious female artist. At mid-century, notions of female respectability demanded behavior that made it impossible for a woman to explore the spaces of public culture where male artists took as their themes. Gathering places in which men shared information and entertainment, such as the post office, businesses, saloons, or clubs, were alien territory for middle-class women. Therefore, Lilly Martin Spencer pivot her theme closely with domestic affairs, grounded it with the insight and observation from an insider's perspective, and depicted it with meticulous but sentimental details only a female artist could achieve.

In the later nineteenth-century, the concept of "woman's sphere" gets prevail in popular literature. It equated woman with home and private life with man. Peeling Onions, however, challenged this idea under the female painter's work that though woman in the painting showed vulnerability in her cry, her hands keep on fulfilling the work determined, showed the resolution and power of female labor.
