= John Davy (composer) =

English composer

John Davy (23 December 1763 – 22 February 1824) was an English composer, particularly of music for stage productions in London.

== Life ==
Davy was born at Creedy Bridge, in the parish of Upton Hellions, eight miles from Exeter, the illegitimate son of Sarah Davie or Davy. He was brought up by his maternal uncle, a blacksmith of Upton Hellions, who also played the cello in the church choir. At less than five years of age he could play on the fife any simple tune after once or twice hearing it. Before he was six years old, Davy selected as many horseshoes, borrowed from a neighbouring smith, as formed a complete octave, hung them from a wall, and with a small rod imitated the chimes of the neighbouring church of Crediton "with great exactness".

James Carrington, then Rector of Upton Hellions and Chancellor of the diocese, hearing of the story, showed Davy a harpsichord, on which he soon learned to play easy lessons. He also began the violin. In his twelfth year he was introduced by Carrington to the Revd Richard Eastcott of Exeter, a well-known amateur, who afterwards, in his Sketches of the Origin, Progress, and Effects of Music (Bath, 1793), gave some account of Davy's extraordinary musical faculties. Eastcott recommended his friends to article him to William Jackson, the organist of Exeter Cathedral. Davy's progress in the study of composition was rapid, and he soon became a capable performer on the organ, violin, viola, and cello.

After completing his articles he continued to live for some years at Exeter as organist and teacher. A passion for the stage, which had once led him to essay the rôle of Zanga to William Dowton's Alonzo at the local theatre, was probably the reason of his coming, about 1800, to London, where he obtained employment as a violinist in the orchestra of Covent Garden Theatre, and as a teacher. His talent as a writer of songs and dance music soon brought him more lucrative work, and for nearly a quarter of a century he was regularly engaged by the Theatres Royal to supply music for the light English opera and pantomime then in fashion. But giving way to habits of intemperance he fell into difficulties, and died neglected and penniless in lodgings in St Martin's Lane, on 22 February 1824. He was buried in St Martin's churchyard on the following 28 February, at the expense of two London tradesmen, one of whom was a native of Crediton.

== Compositions ==
Davy's first published work was the admired "Six Quartetts for voices" [1785?], which was followed by "Twelve favourite Songs with an accompaniment for the pianoforte", Op. 2 [1790?]; "Four Divertimentos for the harp and pianoforte" Op. 6 [1805?]; "A Grand Sonata for the harp" [1805?]; "Six Madrigals for four voices", Op. 13 [1810?]; "A Sonata for the pianoforte" [1820?]; and many other works.

He also set to music the following dramatic pieces: What a Blunder! 1800; Perouse (with John Moorehead), 1801; The Brazen Mask, ballet (with Mountain), 1802; The Cabinet (with Braham and others), 1802; The Caffres (with others), 1802; Rob Roy, 1803; The Miller's Maid, 1804; Harlequin Quicksilver, 1804; Thirty Thousand (with Braham and Reeve), 1805; Spanish Dollars, 1805; Harlequin's Magnet, 1805; The Blind Boy, 1808; The Farmer's Wife (with others), 1814; Rob Roy Macgregor (new version), 1818; Woman's Will, a Riddle, 1820. He composed an overture and additional music for Shakespeare's The Tempest, performed in conjunction with the songs of Purcell, Arne, and Linley.

Some of Davy's songs became great favourites with the public, such as "May we ne'er want a Friend", "The Death of the Smuggler", "Just like Love" and "The Bay of Biscay".

== Externals links ==
- Free scores by John Davy at the International Music Score Library Project (IMSLP)
- John Davy at Hymnary.org
