= Scott Shephard =

British music industry executive and entrepreneur

- Born: Scott Christopher Shephard; 19 September 1979
- Origin: Exeter, Devon, England
- Occupation: Music industry executive
- Years active: 1999-present

Scott Christopher Shephard (born September 19, 1979) is a British entrepreneur and former music industry executive, who served as President of Europe for American record label, Global Music Group.

As a record executive, Shephard released music by artists such as Snoop Dogg, Cyndi Lauper, Pras of the Fugees, East 17, Alexander O’Neal, CeCe Peniston, Lisa Loeb, H-Town, Bobby Valentino, Roachford, actor Kevin Bacon and he released Original Motion Picture Soundtracks from films starring Owen Wilson and Jennifer Aniston. He worked with all three major labels: Universal, Sony and Warner, on releases by artists such as Gorillaz and Post Malone. He worked closely with several artists including Mark Morrison who gave him his first major break, and Warren G who wrote; thanks to Scott Shephard for working and believing in my art in the CD booklet of his album The G Files.

Building on his experience as Vice President of Mark Morrison’s MackLife label, and later serving as President of Europe for Global Music Group, a label distributed by Universal Music Group, Shephard subsequently founded and served as CEO of his own record label So, Let’s Talk. Under his leadership, the label became one of the only fully independent UK record labels to achieve eight hit singles, with 11 chart appearances on the US Billboard charts and UK Official Charts, spending over 50 weeks on the Billboard charts. The label also scored more than 20 hit singles on the UK Dance Charts, including a historic number one, while generating over 1 billion TikTok views and hundreds of millions of streams across Spotify, Apple Music and other streaming platforms.

== Personal life ==
Shephard was born in Exeter, Devon, England, and is a business alumnus of Exeter College. He married his long-time partner Joanne, in a private ceremony in Shropshire on 15 February 2015. British singer Toyah Willcox and Dennis Seaton, frontman of the British reggae band Musical Youth both performed at the wedding reception.

== Career ==
As a marketing assistant, music producer, manager, A&R and executive, Shephard has held positions at various music companies and record labels. His expertise in the music business spans over twenty five years.

He spent many early years as a manager, consultant and A&R. He signed artists to labels such as Caroline Records and Universal Music Group, and licensed music to the likes of All Around the World for their dance compilations Clubland and Floorfillers. Throughout his career, Shephard worked with many electronic dance music artists such as Seeb, B-15 Project, Robbie Rivera, and Sonique.

After leaving college, he began to work as web administrator and promoter for various artists on Death Row Records, the rap label once home to Dr. Dre, Tupac Shakur and Snoop Dogg. His work included marketing releases such as the Dysfunktional Family (soundtrack), managing the official website for R&B artist Danny Boy (dbsoul.com), and acting as personal publicist for artists such as Danny Boy, SKG and Jewell.

In 2001, Shephard got his start working at a record label, when he was introduced to music producer DJ Slip of Comptons Most Wanted, which segued into working with Los Angeles, California based record label IV Life Records and Mafia IV Life car club, founded by Ladell "Del Dog" Rowles. In addition to managing all online marketing, he worked on projects with former professional basketball player Shaquille O'Neal, comedian Steve Harvey, and rapper Snoop Dogg.

Shephard was appointed New Media Manager for the launch of a new label in 2004, Dynasty Entertainment/C.O.B. Digital owned by rapper Crooked I, following his departure from Death Row Records. Responsible for the development and implementation of all digital marketing, alongside Crooked I, Scott designed and developed Dynasty TV; the first ever artist-to-fan video streaming platform before YouTube existed, and WestcoastDynasty.com; a web community that distributed music including the monumental Hip-Hop Weekly series. Crooked I soon became one of the leading faces emerging from music's digital era, and they're innovative marketing strategies were rewarded when music publication Vibe magazine labelled him an "Internet Guerrilla" on the cover of their August 2008 issue, with an article discussing the Hip-Hop Weekly series and his approach to marketing on the internet. Crooked I mentioned Scott at the end of his song "The Finale (Week 52)", and later signed to Eminem's Shady Records as a member of the American hip hop supergroup Slaughterhouse.

Shephard co-founded public relations agency 2SPR in 2004, with friend Peter Stannard. The company represented events and projects from notable clients including Stevie Wonder, La Toya Jackson and late South African President Nelson Mandela. They were involved with numerous hit singles and albums on both the UK and US music charts, notably making history when George Tandy Jr.'s debut single "March" reached number 3 on Billboard's Adult R&B Songs chart, being the first independent artist to ever do so on the chart. Shephard was later a consultant for former world boxing champion Chris Eubank.

Shephard got his start in the business side of the industry through music manager Johnny Lawes, who owned Jago Management and managed artists such as Mark Morrison and Gabrielle in the mid-90s. In a tribute to Lawes in 2019, he wrote; by chance, I crossed paths with this man, who gave me my break, and has been an inspiration throughout my career. Shephard worked with Lawes for many years, which led him to Mack Life Records to become Head of Online for R&B singer Mark Morrison. Shephard’s career breakthrough came when Morrison made him Vice President of his Mack Life Records label. His duties then involved working with Warner Music Group and Universal Music Group on a multi-platinum catalogue, and he worked on single releases such as Cooped Up/Return of the Mack by Post Malone, Mark Morrison & Sickick, The Mack by Nevada featuring Fetty Wap and Mark Morrison, which amassed over 200 Million streams, and Provide by G-Eazy featuring Chris Brown and Mark Morrison, which Shephard was quoted as saying in the Leicester Mercury newspaper as having received one million streams on Spotify within the first 24 hours of release, giving Morrison his 13th UK hit single, meaning he has had a chart hit in each of the last three decades.

In October 2008, Shephard was appointed President of Global Music Group Europe, the European division of New York-based record label, Global Music Group. The company purchased historic hip-hop label Death Row Records for $25 million on 25 June 2008. In June 2009, Global Music Group announced that former Interscope and Warner Bros senior executive Kevin Black had been appointed Chief Operating Officer, while also announcing their expansion into Canada and Europe, with Cliff Wise appointed President of Global Music Group Canada, and Scott Shephard being appointed President of Global Music Group Europe.

Along with Trae Tha Truth and video director Steven Philip, Shephard was the brainchild of one of the biggest urban music videos of 2012. Trae Tha Truth's I'm On 2.0, featured Big K.R.I.T., Jadakiss, J. Cole. Kendrick Lamar, B.o.B, Tyga, Gudda Gudda, Bun B and Mark Morrison, along with cameos from Wiz Khalifa, Iggy Azalea, and CeeLo Green. The video was MTV's Jam of the Week, and the song trended worldwide on Twitter ten minutes after it was released. In an interview Steven Philip explained how the song and video came about, saying; “after the success of “I’m On” by Trae Tha Truth, me and Trae had kind of mentioned a possible remix. Then Mark Morrison’s label guy Scott Shephard reached out with interest, and we agreed on shooting not a remix, but a 2.0”.

In June 2015, Shephard was interviewed by Breakaway Magazine, on the future of the music business in the digital age. He announced that he had launched an umbrella organisation, SC923, consisting of several media brands, including FFConnect, a curatorial brand for playlists on Spotify. Shephard was interviewed by American music industry trade publication Hits Magazine, who featured one of his playlists as 'Playlist of the Week'. Ranya Khoury, streaming manager for Hits Magazine, said “Shephard has been able to accumulate over 22k followers on Spotify alone. Chatting with him about this specific playlist made his keen industry insight evident”. The playlist brand was also chosen by music platform Soundplate, as 1 of 15 great electronic music curators on Spotify, “FFConnect is one of our favourite independent curation brands at the moment,” said Soundplate.com.

In November 2017, Shephard founded his own boutique record label, So, Let's Talk Ltd. The label's relationships with its artists run deep, with Pras Michel of the Fugees being the first artist to sign a deal, resulting in the release of a collaboration single with Exeter-based band The Loft Club. The label has released music by East 17, Lisa Loeb, Alexander O’Neal, David Zowie, Roachford, H-Town and Snoop Dogg. In 2018, Shephard had offers from major distributors to distribute the label. He decided to stay independent, secured a distribution deal with Stem, and the first release in March 2018, a debut single by British singer Osborne entitled Complete (Lucky Rose Remix), surpassed 15 million streams across platforms by March 2019, amassing over 10 million streams on Spotify alone. So, Let's Talk soon began upstreaming artists to major labels such as Universal Music Group, and according to music analytics website Songstats, as of 2022 its independent catalogue had exceeded 50 million streams on digital music stores and 500 million plays on TikTok. In 2023, So, Let’s Talk had two independent singles reach the US Billboard charts; on 16 September 2023, Strokey Doke by American R&B group H-Town reached number 26 on the Billboard Adult R&B Songs chart, and on 21 October 2023, Pac Man by Shazam Conner & Justin Novak entered the US Billboard Dance/Electronic Digital Song Sales chart at number 4. Both singles also reached number 1 on the US iTunes chart. By 2026, the label had achieved over 1 billion TikTok views, hundreds of millions of global streams, over 20 hits on the UK Dance Charts, and 8 hit singles on the Billboard charts and UK Official Charts. The labels catalog spent over 50 weeks on the Billboard charts.

On 23 January 2021, Shephard was interviewed by Sarah Gosling on BBC Music Introducing In The South West. It was later made available on BBC Sounds as a programme called Record label advice with Scott Shephard from So Let's Talk.
