= Florence Given =

British artist, author and social activist

- Born: 19 November 1998 (age 27); Plymouth, Devon, England
- Education: London College of Fashion
- Occupations: Writer; illustrator; influencer; podcaster
- Years active: 2018–present

Florence Given (born 19 November 1998) is a British illustrator, writer, and influencer.

== Early life ==
Given was born in Plymouth, Devon. She attended Plymouth College of Art from age 16 to 18 before moving to London in 2017 to study at the London College of Fashion.

== Career ==
In 2018, Given launched a petition to cancel the Netflix series Insatiable, which she accused of fat-shaming, gaining over 300,000 signatures. Given uses social media platforms, such as Instagram, to raise awareness of issues of sexuality, race and gender.

Given's first book, Women Don't Owe You Pretty, was published on 11 June 2020. It explores ideas in contemporary feminism. Given's second book, Girl Crush, was published in August 2022. A fiction book, it follows the bisexual woman Eartha after she goes viral on the internet. It topped the Sunday Times Bestseller List.

Her podcast Exactly launched in January 2022. With guests including Munroe Bergdorf, Sofie Hagen and Jameela Jamil, Given discusses sex, relationships and social media. It won the gold award for Best Marketing Campaign at the 2022 British Podcast Awards.

In August 2024, she published her third book, Women Living Deliciously, which became a Sunday Times bestseller and was named a Times book of the year. The same year, she was named among the Forbes 30 under 30 list.

In December 2025, she launched her independent podcast The Florence Given Show, with new episodes releasing weekly.

== Influences ==
Given has cited model and activist Munroe Bergdorf and fashion writer Chidera Eggerue as influences. Eggerue criticized Given's first book, Women Don't Owe You Pretty, as unusually similar to her own books in style and prose content. She argued that this was an instance of ideas from the black community being appropriated by white authors for profit.

== Recognition ==
Given won Cosmopolitan's UK Influencer of the Year 2019 for her work on women's mental health. Irish magazine Her listed her among its Women of the Year 2019.

== Personal life ==
Given is bisexual. As of 2025, she resides in Los Angeles.

== Bibliography ==
- Given, Florence (2020). Women Don't Owe You Pretty. Cassell. ISBN 9781788402118.
- Given, Florence (2022). Girl Crush. Octopus. ISBN 9781914240577.
- Given, Florence (2024). Women living deliciously. S&S/Simon Element. ISBN 9781668067123.
