= Global Music Group =

Record label based in USA

- Founded: 2006
- Founder: Roland Turner
- Distributor: Universal Music Group (United States)
- Genre: Hip hop Rap; R&B; Rock; Country; Pop; Ameriflow
- Country of origin: United States
- Location: Nashville Tennessee, USA

Global Music Group is a United States-based record label, distributed by Universal Music Group. The company also has divisions in Canada, Asia and Europe.

== Company history ==
Global Music Group was founded by Roland Turner, Tennessee and Anthony Marotta, in New York City. Roland Turner is a professional musician, who has produced more than 300 albums and toured with such artist as Tina Marie, Whitney Houston, Anita Baker, Kyper, Debbie Deb, and Stevie B. Every year, for the past 10, Roland has put together a line up of multi-platinum artist, the American All Stars and tours the World.

On June 25, 2008 with the assistance of Bankruptcy attorney Kathleen P. March and Entertainment Consultant, Ryon Patterson of KAKI Entertainment; Global Music Group, New York acquired the winning bid to purchase the hip-hop label Death Row Records for $24 million. Death Row Records, the label that released albums by Tupac Shakur, Dr. Dre and Snoop Dogg was available for auction after founder Suge Knight filed bankruptcy in the wake of a $107 million judgment he was ordered to pay to label co-founder Lydia Harris. The deal, however, collapsed due to infighting between the initial founders and the investors. There were multiple Global Music Group corporations created and in addition to the actual winning bid to Global Music Group, New York; each of the corporations were claiming ownership, including Global Music Group Tennessee and Global Music Group, Delaware. Subsequently, Global Music Group, New York was unable to deliver funds and the Bankruptcy Court held a new auction for the assets of Death Row Records, with the winning bid going to Canadian-based WIDEawake Entertainment Group, created in 2006 by Lara Lavi, for $18M.,

In August 2008 Global Music Group signed multi-platinum British R&B artist, Mark Morrison. The Label issued a statement on August 5, 2008 via their website welcoming Mark Morrison and emphasizing the acquisition of Death Row Records, which was ultimately unsuccessful. Soon after, in November 2008, multi-platinum selling R&B singer/songwriter Lil' Mo signed a two-album deal with Global Music Group.

In June 2009, it was announced that former Interscope and Warner Bros. record executive Kevin Black, had been appointed Chief Operating Officer of Global Music Group. Along with Cliff Wise, appointed CEO of Global Music Group Canada, and Scott C Shephard being appointed President/CEO of Global Music Group Europe.

In 2014, Roland Turner, who is still in control of Global Music Group as CEO, recently started a motion picture division.

=== Global Music Group in Alabama ===
In September 2008, Global Music Group opened an office, and studio in Mobile, Alabama. The company hosted a red carpet label launch party on October 29, 2008 in Mobile, Alabama.

In November 2012, former chairman and CEO of the Universal Music Group, Doug Morris announced that Global Music Group signed their first artist in 4 years. Morris recently said in an interview that Global Music Group was working with a 16-year-old recording artist from Birmingham, and would soon be launching the new artist in 2013.

In February 2013, Roland Turner bought the YEE HAW theater in Branson, and has one of the top shows in town. Turner also bought the night club Midnite Rose and changed the name to RAGIN CAJUN. It has become one of the top night spots in the Branson area.

In November 2013 Michael Ward joined Global Music Group as a Partner and producer located on the West Coast. Michael has produced several hit records, and is currently working on several promising projects, which includes scoring the new Movie "Finding IT". Michael & Roland also purchased Gators Bar & Grill, located in Branson West and will open it in December 2013 as the BOURBON STREET BAR & GRILL.

=== Global Entertainment Group ===
On July 22, 2015, Global Music Group announced that the company has re-branded as Global Entertainment Group, a new International Distribution label.

== Artists ==
=== Current roster ===
Artists who are currently signed include:

- Lil' Mo
- Suga Free
- Marya Roxx
- Mustang Sally
- Chris Reaper
- Stony Run
- Janet Martin
- Cash Camp
- Fat Rate
- Rage official
- TRAP EMPIRE LLC.QUINTON BROWN
- gingrr

=== Former roster ===
Artists who were once signed include:

- Mark Morrison
- DMX
- Derek DeGrate
- Hussein Fatal
- K.A.L.I.
- Black Medallion
- Early Pearl
- C.B. Shaw
