= Women Don't Owe You Pretty =

2020 non-fiction book by Florence Given

- Front cover
- Author: Florence Given
- Subject: Intersectional feminism
- Publisher: Cassell
- Publication date: 11 June 2020
- Publication place: United Kingdom
- ISBN: 9781788402118

Women Don't Owe You Pretty is a 2020 book by the British activist and illustrator Florence Given. On the topic of intersectional feminism, Given writes about relationships, body image and self-esteem for women. The book sold 100,000 copies within six months of publication and was listed on The Sunday Times' bestsellers list for twelve consecutive weeks, peaking at second place.

== Background ==
Author Florence Given is an artist and campaigner, active on the social media platform Instagram. She was 21 at the time of the book's release. Given was both writer and illustrator. She said that she aimed with the book to "hopefully poke some holes in [the] façade" that women "need men, their validation and the products they sell to us to make us look 'better'", saying that "capitalist patriarchy requires us to be submissive and insecure in this way". She perceived that it would make readers "demand a new level of love for themselves". Given found it hardest to write a chapter on consent and rape culture, saying that "the one thing [women] all have in common is that almost every single one of us has been sexually assaulted or sexually harassed by men".

In September 2019, it was announced that Cassell—an imprint of the Octopus Publishing Group—had acquired the rights to the book. It was published on 11 June 2020. Due to the COVID-19 pandemic, Given narrated the audiobook from her home. Given began an Instagram campaign in August 2020, when she had roughly half a million followers, encouraging users to post pictures of themselves holding her book. Waterstones released a signed "gold edition" in late 2020. Octopus Publishing Group began a guerrilla marketing campaign in Birmingham, London and Manchester, and on social media, in December 2020.

Chidera Eggerue, who was quoted on the front cover of the first edition and cited as an influence, criticized it as unusually similar to her own books (What a Time to Be Alone and How to Get Over a Boy) in style and prose content. She argued that this was an instance of ideas from the black community being appropriated by white authors for profit. Eggerue also criticized Google for highlighting Given's work alongside or above her own for many readers who searched "Chidera Eggerue book", "black feminist books" or similar phrases. Given's reply to Eggerue's comments included a description of her donating part of her book advance to black liberation charities. Eggerue was dissatisfied with Given's response.

== Synopsis ==
Through the lens of intersectional feminism and social privilege analysis, Given discusses topics including body positivity and self-esteem, consent in relationships, emotional labour, internalised misogyny, masturbation, microaggressions, rape culture and slut-shaming. The book contains checklists and questions for the reader to consider. Given gives advice on recognising gaslighting, racial fetishism and other negative actions or signs in a relationship, and discusses how queer relationships affect a culture of heteronormativity. She has a fictional conversation with her younger self as a framing device for exploring male validation.

The book's title is derived from a quote by lexicographer Erin McKean: "“You Don’t Have to Be Pretty. You don’t owe prettiness to anyone. Not to your boyfriend/spouse/partner, not to your co-workers, especially not to random men on the street. You don’t owe it to your mother, you don’t owe it to your children, you don’t owe it to civilisation in general. Prettiness is not a rent you pay for occupying a space marked ‘female'.”

== Reception ==
According to Nielsen BookScan, roughly 50,000 copies of the book sold by 20 June 2020, and it reached 100,000 sales within six months of publication. The book became a number one bestseller on Amazon and a 2020 bestselling hardback nonfiction book for Waterstones. It was on The Sunday Times' bestseller list from 21 June to 6 September 2020, debuting at third and peaking at second, with a lowest position of fourth.

Phoebe Luckhurst of the Evening Standard gave the book four stars out of five, calling it "rallying, radical and pitched perfectly for her generation" and praising the "stylish, stylised illustrations" and Given's "vehement without being unremitting" tone. BBC Science Focus listed it as one of the "28 of the best non-fiction and fiction books" in 2020, with reviewer Camilla Pang writing that the book made her feel "safe but also empowered, abundant, and confident" in her womanhood.
