= Jackson of Exeter =

English organist and composer

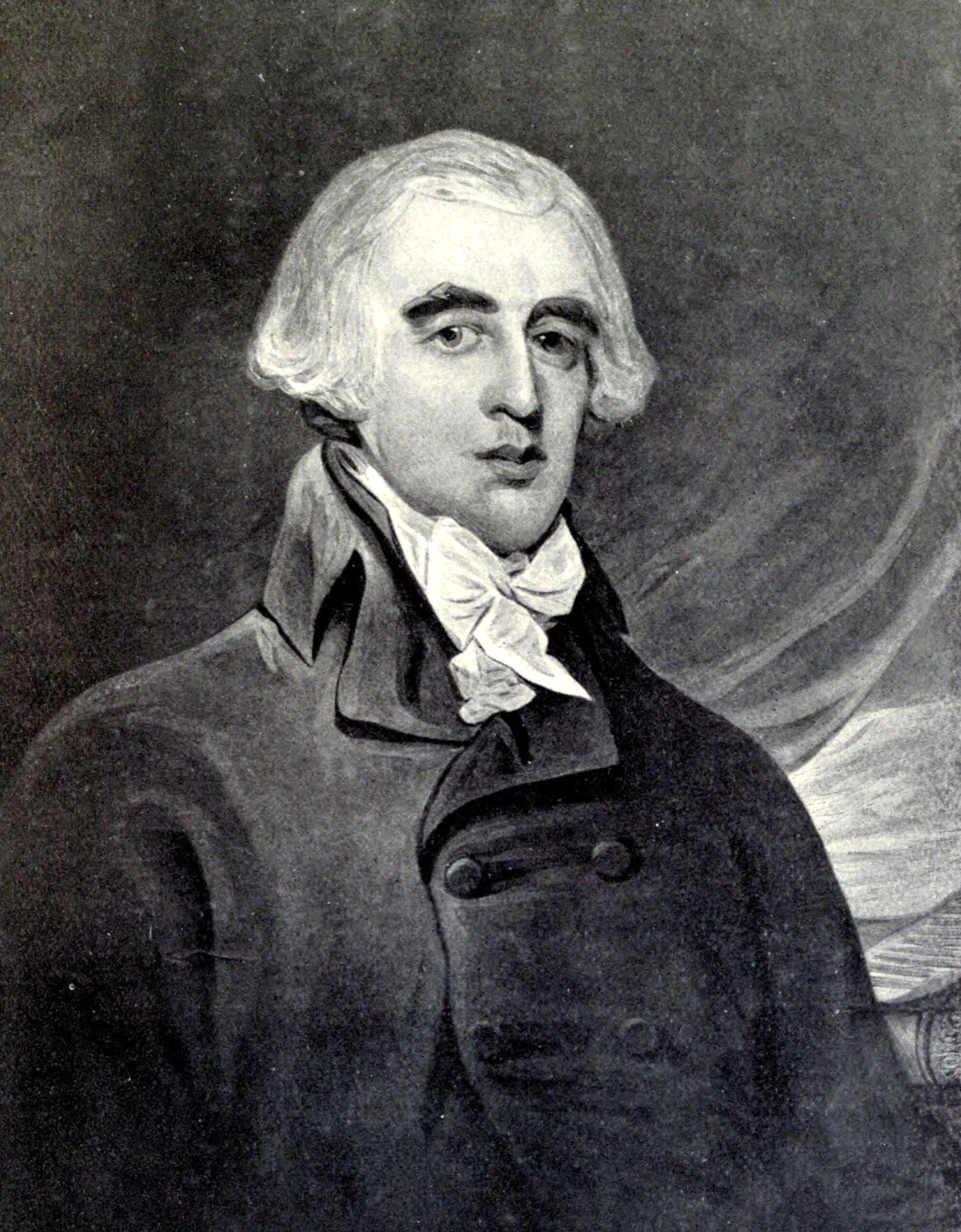
Jackson of Exeter

William Jackson (29 May 1730 – 5 July 1803), referred to as Jackson of Exeter, was an English organist and composer.

== Life ==
Jackson was born and died in Exeter, England, the son of an Exeter grocer, who later became master of the city workhouse. After receiving some musical instruction from John Silvester, organist of Exeter Cathedral, Jackson was sent in 1748 to London, to become a pupil of John Travers, organist to the Chapel Royal.

In 1767 Jackson wrote the music for an adaptation of Milton's Lycidas, which was produced at Covent Garden on 4 November of the same year, on the occasion of the death of Prince Edward, Duke of York and Albany, brother to George III. While in London, he was a visitor at the meetings of the Madrigal Society.

On his return to Exeter Jackson devoted himself to teaching music until Michaelmas 1777, when he was appointed subchanter, organist, lay vicar, and master of choristers to the cathedral, in succession to Richard Langdon. Jackson's pupils included George Baker, William Bennet and John Davy.

== Works ==
Jackson composed the operas The Lord of the Manor (1780, libretto by John Burgoyne) and Metamorphoses (1783), as well as several odes (Warton's Ode to Fancy, Pope's The Dying Christian to His Soul, and Lycidas) and a large number of songs, canzonets, madrigals, pastorals, hymns, anthems, sonatas for harpsichord, and church services. His writings include 30 Letters on Various Subjects (London, 1782), Observations on the Present State of Music in London (1791), and The Four Ages, together with Essays on Various Subjects (1798).
