= Sala Bosworth =

American painter

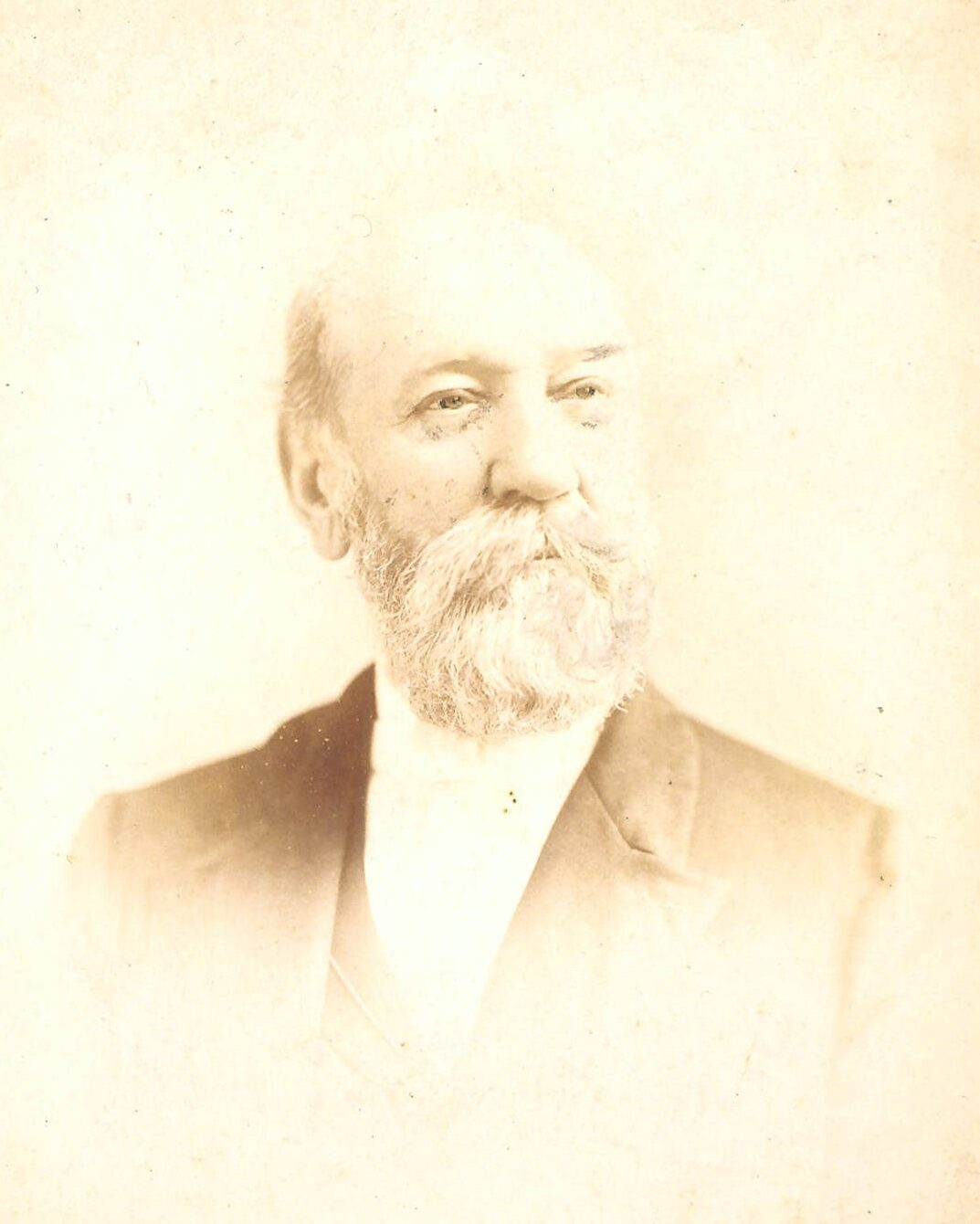
Sala Bosworth, from an 1887 photograph

Sala Bosworth (September 15, 1805 – December 22, 1889) was one of the earliest American painters in Ohio. He painted portraits of many of the early pioneers in Marietta and Southeastern Ohio as well as the natural landscape.

== Biography ==
Bosworth was born on September 15, 1805, in Halifax, Massachusetts, to Sala and Rebecca Perkins Bosworth. In 1816 his family moved to Marietta, Ohio and he graduated from Marietta High School. He studied fine art at the Pennsylvania Academy of Fine Arts in Philadelphia when he was in his 20s.

After school, he went back to Ohio and made a living painting portraits. From 1827, on he was an itinerant painter traveling around southeast Ohio. Some of the towns where he worked were Zanesville, Columbus, Circleville, Athens, Chillicothe, and Belpre. While painting in Athens, Ohio, Bosworth met his future wife, Joanna Shipman. She moved to Marietta to be with him in 1839.

He made many portraits of prominent founding families of white settlers in Marietta including Ephraim Cutler, Rufus Putnam, Johnathan Sprague Jr., Cyrus Byington and his wife Sophie Nye Byington. His drawings of the forts, "Campus Martius", "Marietta at the Point," and "Farmers Castle at Belpre, Ohio" were featured in Samuel P. Hildreth's Pioneer History of the Ohio Valley.

He continued to make a living portrait painting until around the 1840s. At this time, photography was starting to become more popular and people preferred to have their portrait taken rather than painted. To supplement his work as an artist, Bosworth was also the auditor of Washington County, Ohio, from 1846 to 1854 and from 1861 to 1870 was the postmaster in Marietta. As he relied less on his painting as his main source of income, he was able to diversify his subjects, and he made many landscape paintings and drawings.

Later in life, he opened a grocery store and then retired in Cincinnati. Bosworth and his wife moved to Cincinnati and lived with their daughter, Frances, who had married Ephraim Cutler Dawes.

Bosworth died on December 22, 1889, and his wife died on August 12, 1903. When Ephraim Cutler Dawes died, his wife Frances moved to Marietta, Ohio and lived with her deceased husband's parents. She brought many paintings by her father with her and many today are housed at the Dawes Arboretum in Newark, Ohio.
