= Peter Rutley =

English footballer

Personal information
- Date of birth: 19 May 1946 (age 80)
- Place of birth: Exeter, England
- Position: Right half

Senior career*
Years	Team	Apps	(Gls)
1962–1965	Exeter City	16	(0)
1965	Leicester City	0	(0)
1965–1966	Wimbledon	0	(0)
1968–1969	Poole Town		
1969–1970	Margate		
Total		16	(0)
- * Club domestic league appearances and goals

Peter Rutley (born 19 May 1946) is an English former professional footballer who played in the Football League as a right half.
