= Richard Eastcott =

English clergyman and writer on music

Richard Eastcott (baptised on November 22, 1744 – died in 1828) was an English clergyman and writer on music.

Born at Exeter in 1744, he matriculated at Oriel College, Oxford, but did not take a degree. Ordained in the Church of England in 1767, he lived in the Devon area and followed musical interests. At his death in 1828, Eastcott was chaplain of Livery Dale, Devonshire, on the presentation of Lord Rolle.

== Works ==
Eastcott was author of Sketches of the Origin, Progress, and Effects of Music, with an Account of the Ancient Bards and Minstrels, Bath, 1793. The book, which was well received, was constructed from the histories of Charles Burney and John Hawkins. There is a chapter on the state of English church music, in which the author deprecated the custom of writing fugal music for voices, on the ground that such treatment prevents the words from being properly heard.

An elaborate criticism of the book was in the Monthly Review, xiii. 45–50 (see also John Davy). At the end of his book appeared an advertisement of other works by the author.

- Six sonatas for the Harpsichord or Piano Forte, Op.1. London (1773)

== Scores & Book ==
- IMSLP
