= Richard Langdon =

British organist

Richard Langdon (1729 – 8 September 1803) was a British organist, mainly at Exeter Cathedral, where he spent his early years, and later at Bristol Cathedral and Armagh Cathedral. He also composed church music.

== Early career ==
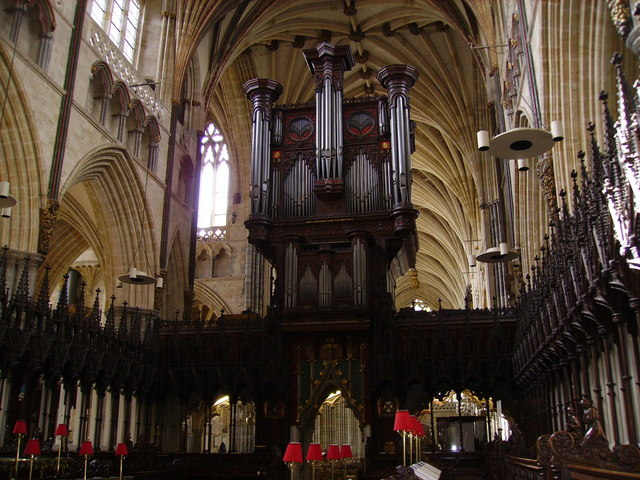
The organ at Exeter Cathedral, 2008

He was born in Exeter in 1729, son of Charles Langdon and a grandson of Tobias Langdon (1683–1712), Vicar choral of Exeter Cathedral. In the summer of 1738, Richard became a chorister at Exeter Cathedral and retained this until spring 1748; by then he had become a secondary. Sub-chanter John Hicks was ordered to teach Richard the organ on 1 December 1744.

On 16 June 1753, he was appointed as Vicar choral of Exeter Cathedral following the death of former organist John Silvester; soon after, on 23 June, was also appointed the cathedral's organist. Langdon's early career was marked without complaints over him or his competence and he taught writing and arithmetic to the choristers.

From 1757 to 1769, large sums of money were paid to Richard for subscriptions to volumes of William Boyce's compositions. The only criticism of Langdon by the cathedral was on 3 March 1759 due to his "frequent" absence and disobedience of the sub-chanter. Soon after on 7 April 1759, he was given permission for five weeks of absence. It is possible that the amount of absence from Langdon was related to his time studying at Oxford University.

He graduated BMus at Exeter College, Oxford on 13 July 1761. Due to failing health, Hicks resigned his position of master of the choristers and Langdon was appointed the position on 8 May 1762 This marked the first time since 1608 (excepting a brief period in 1661) that the position master of the choristers and organist were held by the same person. On 28 August 1770 he married Susanna Evans. Langdon resigned his position and was replaced by Jackson of Exeter, who said this on the matter "he resigned, for a pecuniary consideration, in my favour".

== Bristol and Armagh ==
In November 1777 he was elected organist of Ely Cathedral; soon after in December, he was made organist of Bristol Cathedral; he resigned in June 1781. His last appointment was as organist of Armagh Cathedral in 1782. In 1794, in poor health, he left Armagh and retired to Exeter, where he died on 8 September 1803. A plain white marble tablet was placed in his memory at his resting place in St Paul's Church, Exeter. The church was demolished in 1936 and the memorial moved to Cathedral Close.

== Works ==
Langdon's works include, besides several anthems, Twelve Songs and Two Cantatas, opus 4 (London, unknown date); and Twelve Glees for Three and Four Voices (London, 1770). In 1774 he published Divine Harmony, being a Collection in score of Psalms and Anthems. At the end of this work are twenty chants by various authors, all printed anonymously; the first, a double chant in F, has usually been assigned to Langdon himself.

Cultural offices
| Preceded by John Silvester | Organist and Master of the Choristers of Exeter Cathedral; 1753–1777 | Succeeded by William Jackson |
| Preceded by James Rogers | Organist and Master of the Choristers of Ely Cathedral; 1777–1778 | Succeeded by Highmore Skeats |
| Preceded by Samuel Mineard | Organist and Master of the Choristers of Bristol Cathedral; 1778–1781 | Succeeded by Rice Wasbrough |
| Preceded by James Rogers | Organist and Master of the Choristers of Peterborough Cathedral; 1784–1785 | Succeeded by John Calah |
