= Soundplate =

Soundplate LTD
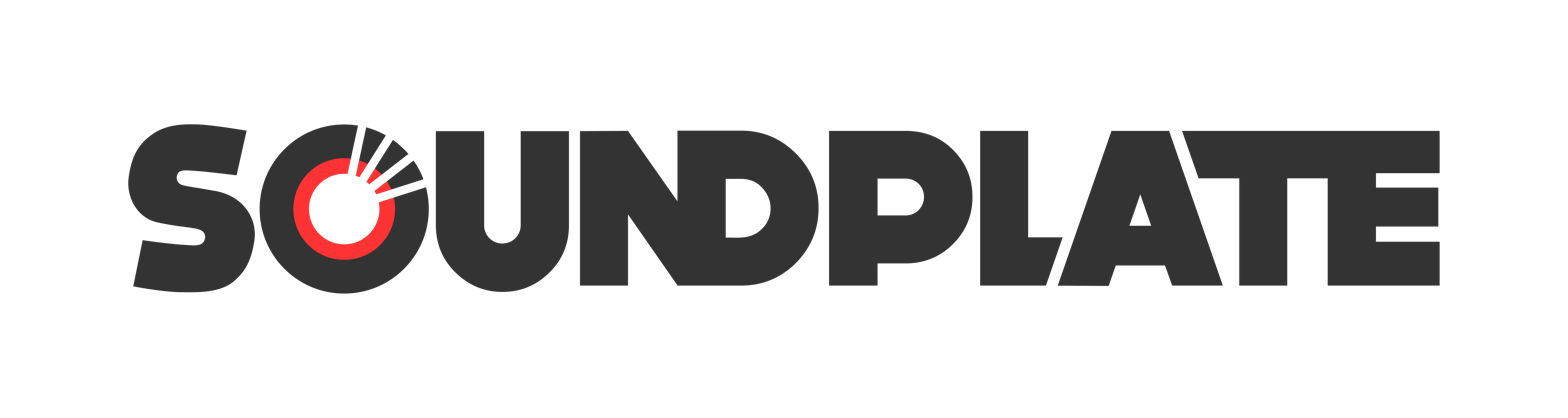
- Industry: Music / Media
- Genre: Electronic Music
- Founded: 2010
- Founder: Matt Benn
- Headquarters: London, United Kingdom
- Products: Website, Music Technology Products, AI Audio Mastering, Record Label

Soundplate is a London-based record label and music technology company.

Soundplate have developed a range of marketing, production, and audio mastering tools and resources for music artists and record labels.

Originally founded in 2010 by Matt Benn, Soundplate started as a website covering all aspects of dance music and all genres of the global scene therein.

Although Soundplate is based in London it is a remote company with team members in several different countries.

== Record Label ==
Soundplate Records has released music for a number of high-profile electronic music artists including Bakermat, Opia, Uppermost, Andrew Applepie and an official remix of album of the late Nina Simone.

To date (Nov 2026), Soundplate Records have released more than 300 titles (including compilations and releases on the sub-label SP NXT).

Soundplate Records is independent and currently distributed worldwide by Believe Digital.

== Website & Tools for Music Artists ==
Soundplate develops tools with a goal of helping independent artists.

Tools Soundplate have developed for artists include:

Tool	Purpose/Description	URL
Soundplate Clicks	Soundplate Clicks allows users to create intelligent songlinks / smart links for music with features designed to help grow an artists fanbase, increase streams & sales, sell more gig tickets and better understand fans.	Click.Soundplate.com
Music Production tools	Soundplate has developed several online tools to help artists with their music production including AI audio mastering, an AI-powered Stem Splitter, a tool to create Slowed + Reverb remixes, a BPM finder and a reverb calculator.	https://soundplate.com/slowed-reverb/
MusicTickers	In 2024 Soundplate launched MusicTickers a tool for creating spinning vinyl animations and other animated content for music marketing.	https://musictickers.com
Music Fibre	a free directory of music industry resources, companies and services.	Musicfibre.com
Play.Soundplate	A free 'playlist submission system' where artists can submit music to hundreds of Spotify & Deezer playlists for free. Other related tools (also at the same web address) include a playlist analyzer and track analyzer.	Play.soundplate.com
Soundplate Music Visualizers	Soundplate can create animated Music Visualizer videos for artists.	Soundplate.com/music-visualizers/
Cover.Soundplate	A completely free tool allowing artist and playlist curators to create cover artwork for their music.	cover.soundplate.com
Jobs.Soundplate	Music industry job board - hand-picked jobs for artists, curators and creatives.	Discontinued

Aside from that, Soundplate publishes a large amounts of unique music content including reviews, interviews with global talent such as Little Louie Vega, DJ EZ and many more and also films and edits video exclusives such as interviews, event videos, original research from surveys and live DJ sets from DJ Kayper, Tramlines Festival and Guy Gerber

== Acquisitions ==
In 2026, Soundplate expanded its music production capabilities by acquiring Stemmer, an audio technology company specialising in providing artificial intelligence audio mastering. Following the acquisition, the technology was rebuilt and integrated to improve the online mastering services offered through Soundplate's website.

== Previous Soundplate Projects ==
In the past, Soundplate has hosted and streamed a dance music industry debate (July 2013) 'The Soundplate Great Vinyl Debate', an awards ceremony. and previously provided a weekly chart for Ministry of Sound Radio

=== Soundplate Events ===
The first official Soundplate event was held inside the world-famous Ministry of Sound in 2012. The Soundplate Awards 2013 were held at Basing House The events have featured in publications including Timeout Magazine, Urban Nerds and All In London Soundplate have also hosted parties in other areas of the UK and Europe.

On July 7, 2013 Soundplate hosted a live debate at Google Campus in London about the future of vinyl. The panel was chaired by Clive Morgan from The Telegraph and included James Lavelle, Sonny Wharton, Uncle Dugs and DJ Magazine.

=== The Soundplate x Ministry of Sound Radio Chart (Weekly) ===
From 2011-2013 Soundplate provided a weekly chart for Ministry of Sound radio which was hosted by Ricky Simmonds as part of his House and Funky show.
