= Lilly Martin Spencer =

American painter

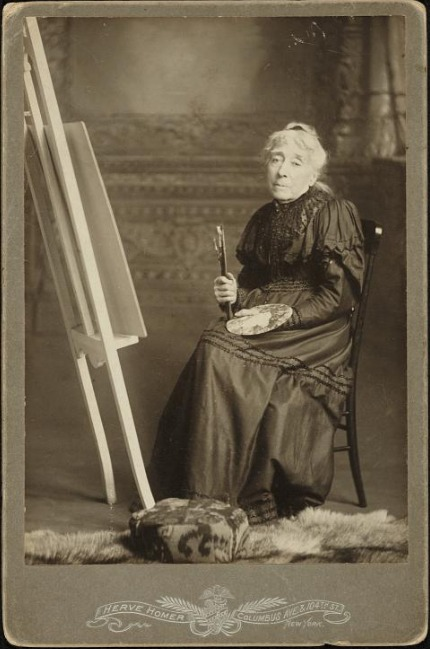
- Born: Angélique Marie Martin; November 26, 1822; Exeter, England
- Died: May 22, 1902 (aged 79); New York City, U.S.
- Known for: Painting
- Movement: Genre painting
- Spouse: Benjamin Rush Spencer (m. 1844; died 1890)
- Children: 13

Lilly Martin Spencer (born Angélique Marie Martin; November 26, 1822 – May 22, 1902) was a widely reproduced American genre painter in the mid-nineteenth century. Born in England to French parents, she primarily painted domestic scenes, paintings of women and children, although over the course of her career she would also come to paint works of varying style and subject matter, including portraits of famous individuals such as suffragist Elizabeth Cady Stanton. Although she did have an audience for her work, Spencer had difficulties earning a living as a professional painter and faced financial trouble for much of her adult life.

== Biography ==
=== Early life ===
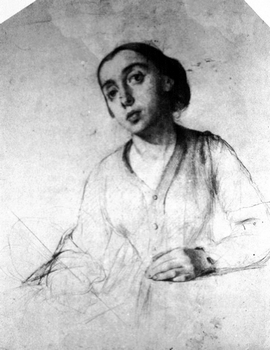
Self portrait, 1848

Lilly Martin Spencer was born in Exeter, England, to French parents Gilles Marie Martin and Angélique Perrine lePetit Martin. In 1830, when Martin was eight, her family immigrated to New York City where they remained for three years before ultimately moving to Marietta, Ohio. There Martin was homeschooled by her parents and began what would be her long career as an artist. Her first artistic endeavors were "likenesses of the entire household, in lifelike, characteristic postures, so truthful as to be recognized at once by everyone who knew them." These likenesses were drawn on the walls of the family home. Rather than being scolded, Lilly was encouraged in her love of art by her parents, whose reformist tendencies—her mother was a follower of Charles Fourier, a utopian socialist—included a belief in more opportunity for women. She continued to draw and her work was so impressive that "ladies and gentlemen began to call frequently at the farm, to judge for themselves of these vaunted pictures. Their admiring comments stimulated her ambition and added to her industry; but the difficulty of procuring proper materials and the want of a competent teacher retarded her progress."

Yet she drew the attention of local artists and was mentored and helped, especially in coloring her charcoal drawings. One such mentor was Sala Bosworth, a portrait and landscape artist who trained at the Pennsylvania Academy of Fine Arts. The second was Charles Sullivan (1794–1867) who had also studied at the Pennsylvania Academy of Fine Arts; his influence is very apparent in the early work of Lilly Martin. Lilly's first exhibition in August 1841 was held at a church rectory, where she drew the attention of Nicholas Longworth, a benefactor of many artists. Of Lilly Martin, Longworth said “…a new genius has sprung up at Marietta or rather within five miles of it, at a farm house in the shape of a French girl of 17 or 18 years of age. She already has painted a great number of pictures. She is entirely self taught, excels in attitudes and designs."

Though Lilly had originally traveled with her father to Cincinnati with the hopes of Longworth offering to sponsor an exhibition for Lilly, Longworth offered to help Lilly financially and discouraged her from further shows until she had more training. Longworth first made an offer to Lilly to send her to Boston for training, along with five hundred dollars. This advice she ignored; instead, she along with her father traveled to Cincinnati for an exhibition in the autumn of 1841. Cincinnati was "swarming with artists" and Lilly would spend the next seven years studying there. This would be the most highly productive period in her career, and is marked by her move from Cincinnati to New York, and ends with her move to New Jersey. Lilly turned down Longworth's offer to send her to Europe to study; instead she received help and instruction from portrait artist James Beard and other local artists. While in Cincinnati, Lilly studied under portrait painter John Insco William. However the exact extent of her training is unknown. She produced her most well-known and popular works during the decade between 1848 and 1858.

=== Married life ===
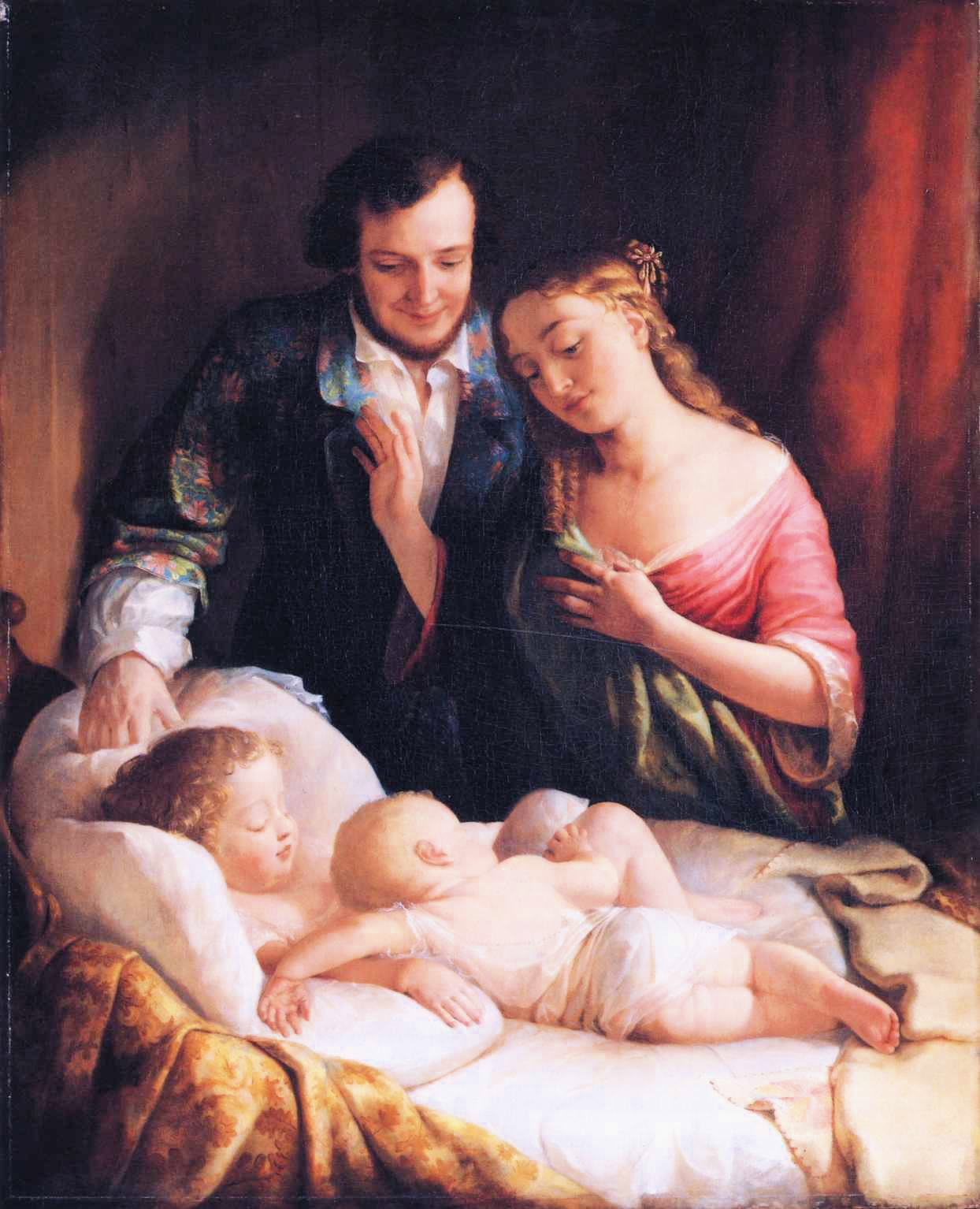
Domestic Happiness (1849)

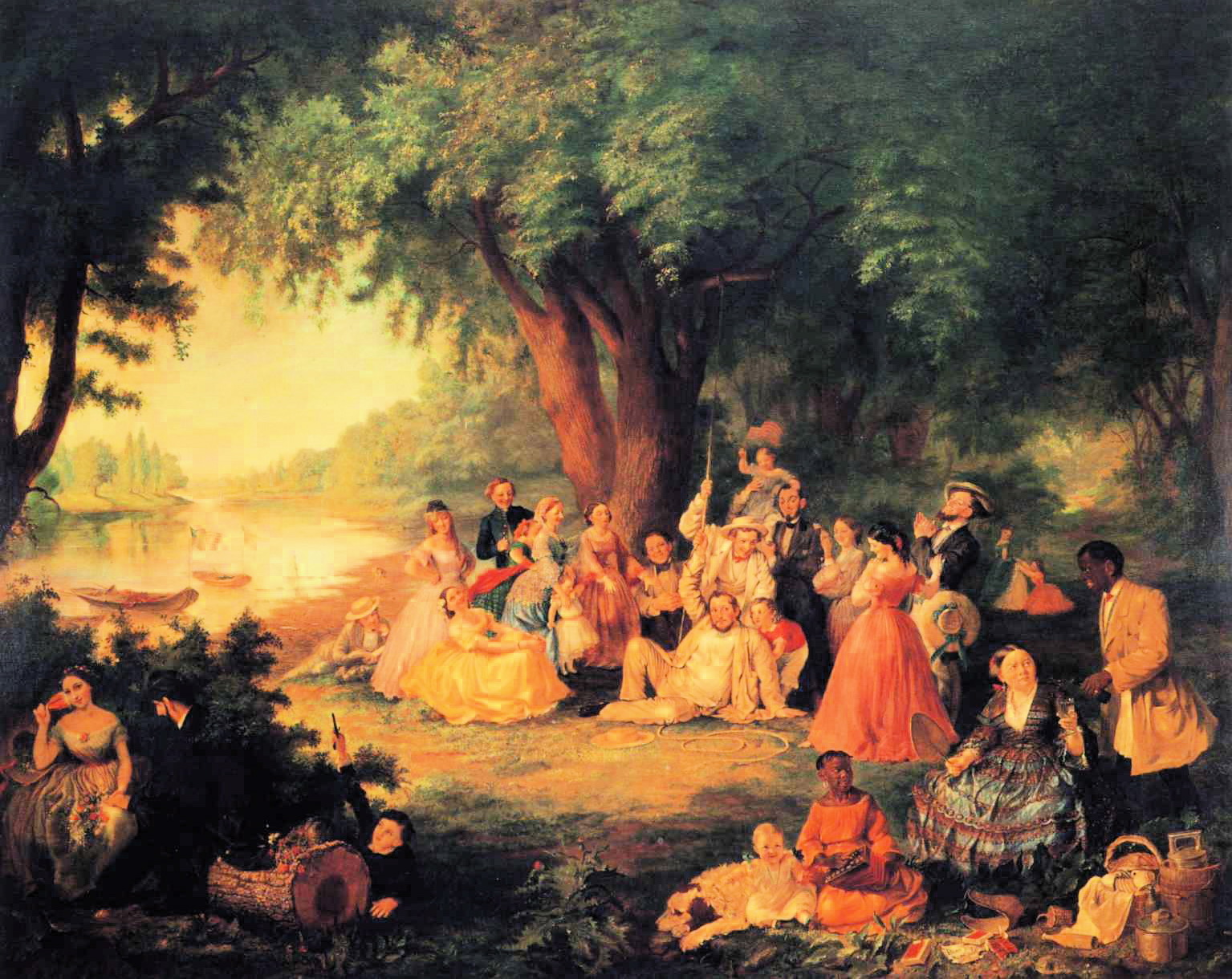
The Artist and Her Family on a Fourth of July Picnic (c.1864)

During her third year in Cincinnati she married Benjamin Rush Spencer on August 24, 1844. Benjamin Spencer was an Englishman who worked in the tailoring business; however once they were married he no longer pursued an independent career, instead dedicating himself to helping his wife both in household chores as well as with her artistic work. This made Mrs. Spencer the main breadwinner for the family. Although the Spencers did not run a traditional home, from all accounts they had a "singularly happy one". Although many feared that matrimony would end her career as an artist, it did not; she became the most popular and widely reproduced female genre painter of the mid-19th century. The couple had 13 children together, of which seven survived into adulthood.

The Spencers experienced chronic financial difficulties. In pursuit of greater opportunity they moved to New York City in 1848. There she was already known through exhibitions at the National Academy of Design and the American Art-Union. By the time the Spencers arrived in New York "art patronage was firmly in the hands of the middle class which was eager to 'purchase' culture, and quick to assert their preference for scenes which they could identify." Lilly Martin Spencer easily filled this gap with domestic scenes, often using her own family and pets as models. In 1849 she produced her first major successful painting, Life's Happy Hour. Scholars have noted that due to the demand of the time Spencer was "able to combine her two roles, as artist and mother with a certain degree of success." Her works were all positive and devoid of tragedy, depicting endearing scenes of domesticity; Robin Bolton-Smith and Douglas Hyland have commented that in this period "her paintings exude an enthusiasm and happiness reminiscent of seventeenth-century Dutch art…(and are) enhanced by a disarming gaze directly toward the viewer or his inclusion in a coy flirtation, tease, or practical joke."

Despite her positive reputation there was a disparity between Spencer’s apparent popularity and her financial success. Most of her sales were a result of art unions, and their downfall, as a result of low membership subscriptions, was a blow to her sales. She also sold possibly a million lithographs of her paintings, but of these she only received profit from the sales of the rights to the painting. She also illustrated books and magazines, such as Godey's Lady's Book and Women of the American Revolution. Again, due to the difficulty in making ends meet the Spencers moved to Newark, New Jersey, in 1858. There they raised chickens and planted vegetables in order to stave off actual starvation. Spencer continued to make portraits and commissions whenever possible, and still supported her family through her art, but money remained a problem. During the late 1850s, in an attempt to expand the range of her options in domestic scenes she added sexuality to the women in her domestic spaces. This new sexuality could be due to an influx of European images, which showed women as sexual beings. This was demonstrated in more suggestive figures and elaborate hairstyles and dress

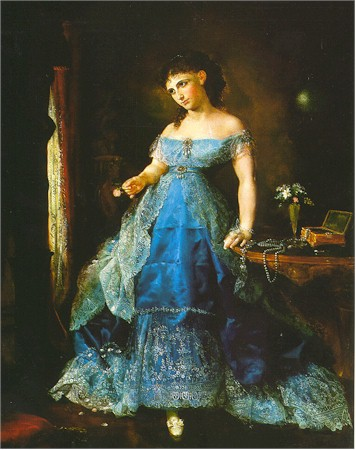
We Both Must Fade (Mrs. Fithian) (1869)

Throughout the 1860s the Civil War changed the outlook of many artists, including Spencer. Her paintings become more thoughtful and included more patriotic themes and titles. She produced famous and perceptive works of art such as War Spirit at Home in 1866 and We Both Must Fade in 1869, which depicts a young female looking in a mirror. The title offers a view of woman in society, which applied at least during the mid-19th century, commenting on concepts of the importance of beauty of women and their role in society. It was during this time that she painted what she considered her masterpiece, Truth Unveiling Falsehood. The piece is divided in half; on one side a monstrous woman with a sheep's head is about to devour a helpless babe in its grasp, and at its feet a figure with a grossly deformed hand pays homage. On the other side a beautiful woman nurses a child. The image is divided by Truth, an angelic blond figure who lifts a cloak (Falsehood) off the monster exposing the woman-as-beast, referred to as Selfishness. The piece was not commissioned, and Spencer refused to sell it even when offered $20,000. The work, whose meaning remains ambiguous today, is her only such piece with an allegorical message.

=== Later life ===
The family moved again in the winter of 1879–80 to rural Highland, New York. Her paintings reflect this change with increased detail in landscape and farm life scenes. During the 1880s Spencer attempted to reintroduce her work to the public but found that the market had drastically altered since the Civil War. No longer was it driven by middle class mentality; instead the wealthy were steered by art dealers pushing "serious" European work. Lilly’s art dealer said, "You have not lost your old skill but in some particulars have improved on the old time things. You are broader and simpler in execution and finer in color I think," however clients were buying "the great Foreign names." Yet she continued to try and sell work only to find "her particular kind of work had outlived popular favor."

Her husband of forty-six years, Benjamin, died in February 1890, leaving Lilly a widow. She sold the farm and moved again, to a farm 10 miles away, while maintaining a studio downtown. Spencer continued to work but her financial situation remained insecure, and sometimes she was forced to pay for services with art. Lilly Martin Spencer worked until the day of her death on May 22, 1902. She was buried at Highland Cemetery in Highland, New York.

She had a career that spanned more than 60 years, and painted portraits of influential people of the time, such as First Lady Caroline Harrison and the suffragist Elizabeth Cady Stanton. She persevered despite financial turmoil and facing challenges that all artists must address, as well specific difficulties for a female working in a male-dominated world.

== Artistic style ==
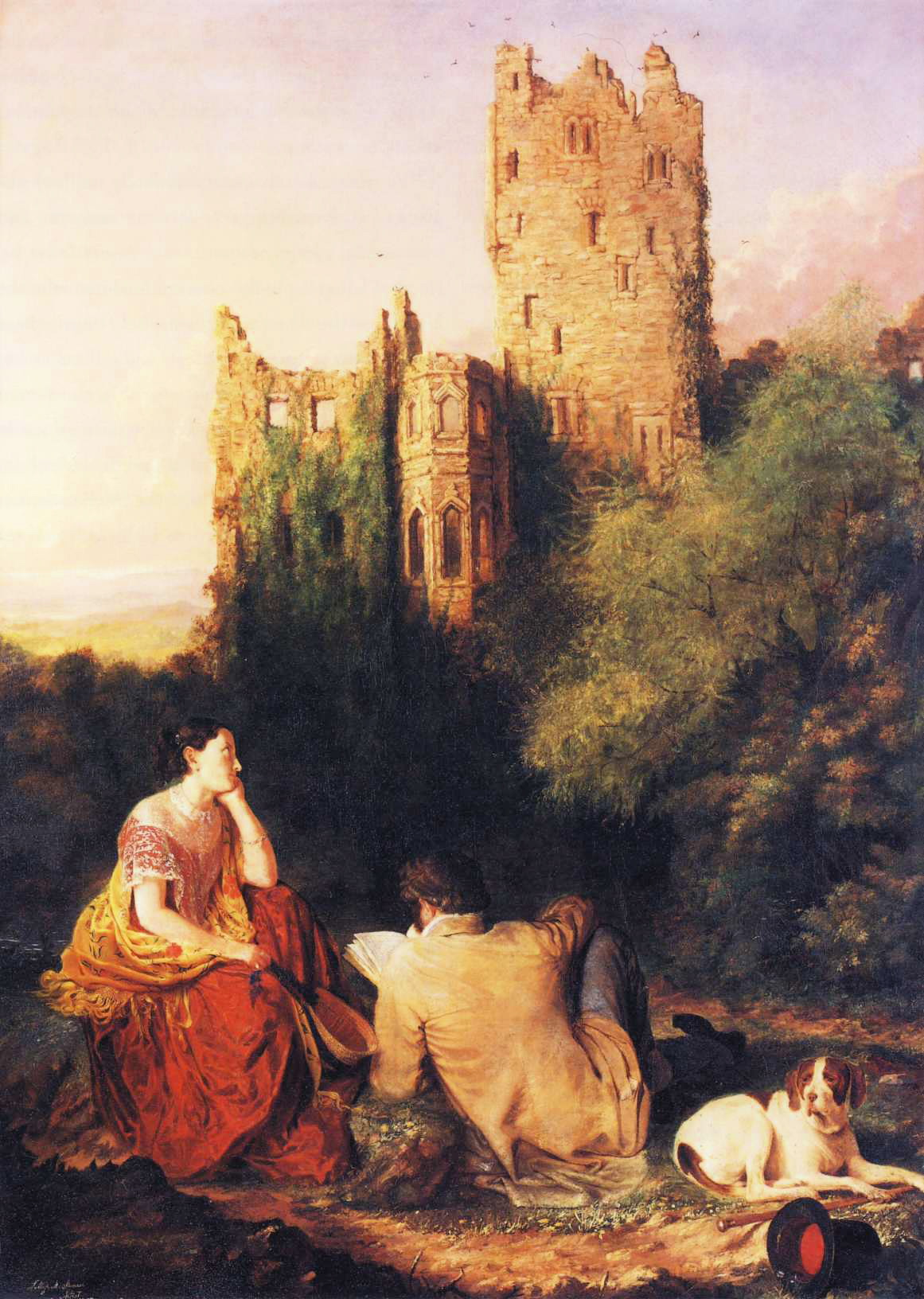
Reading the Legend (1852)

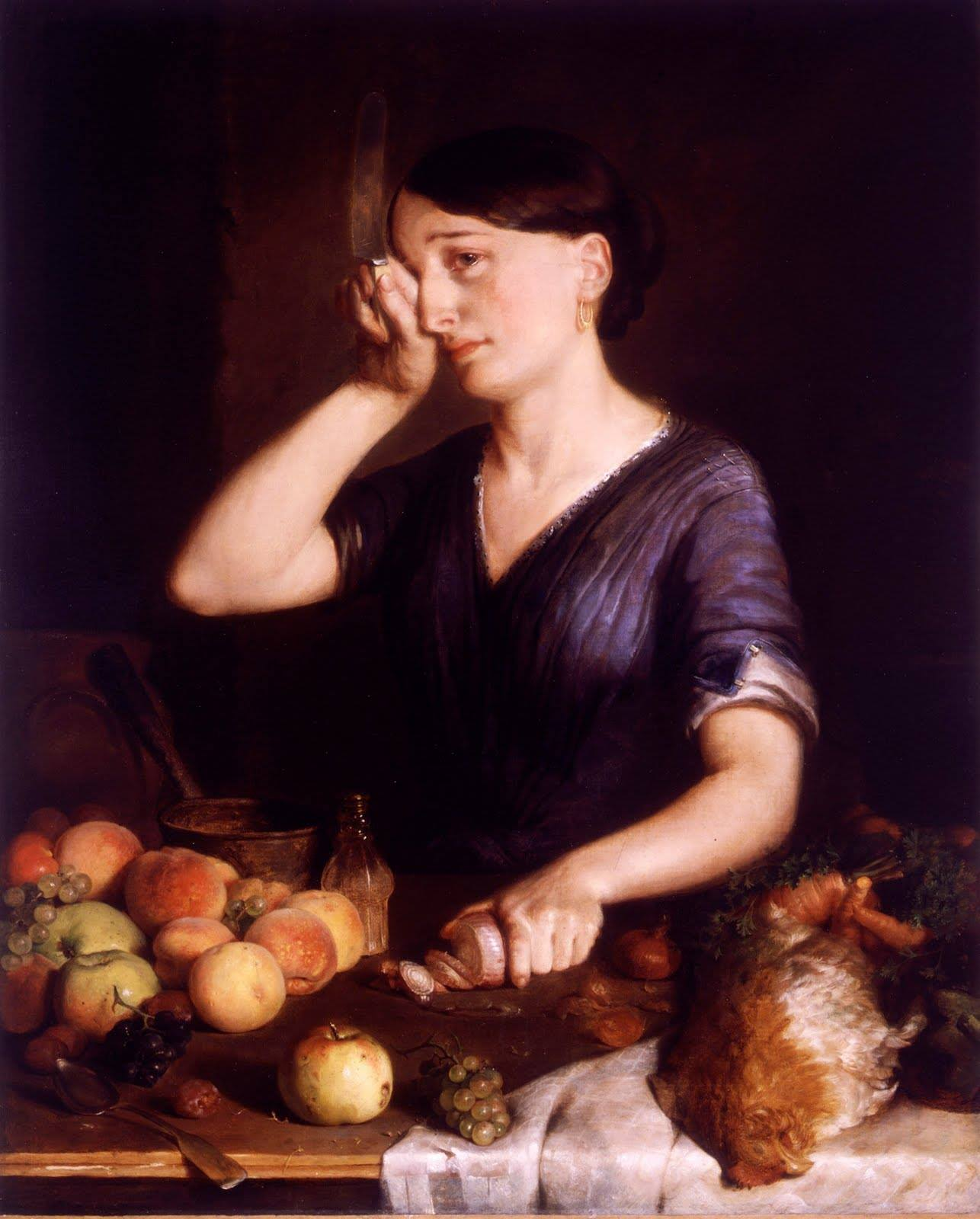
Peeling Onions, c. 1852

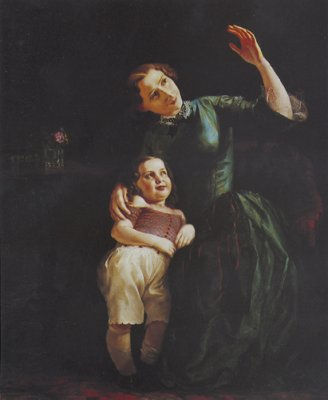
See How the Sun Shines (1855)

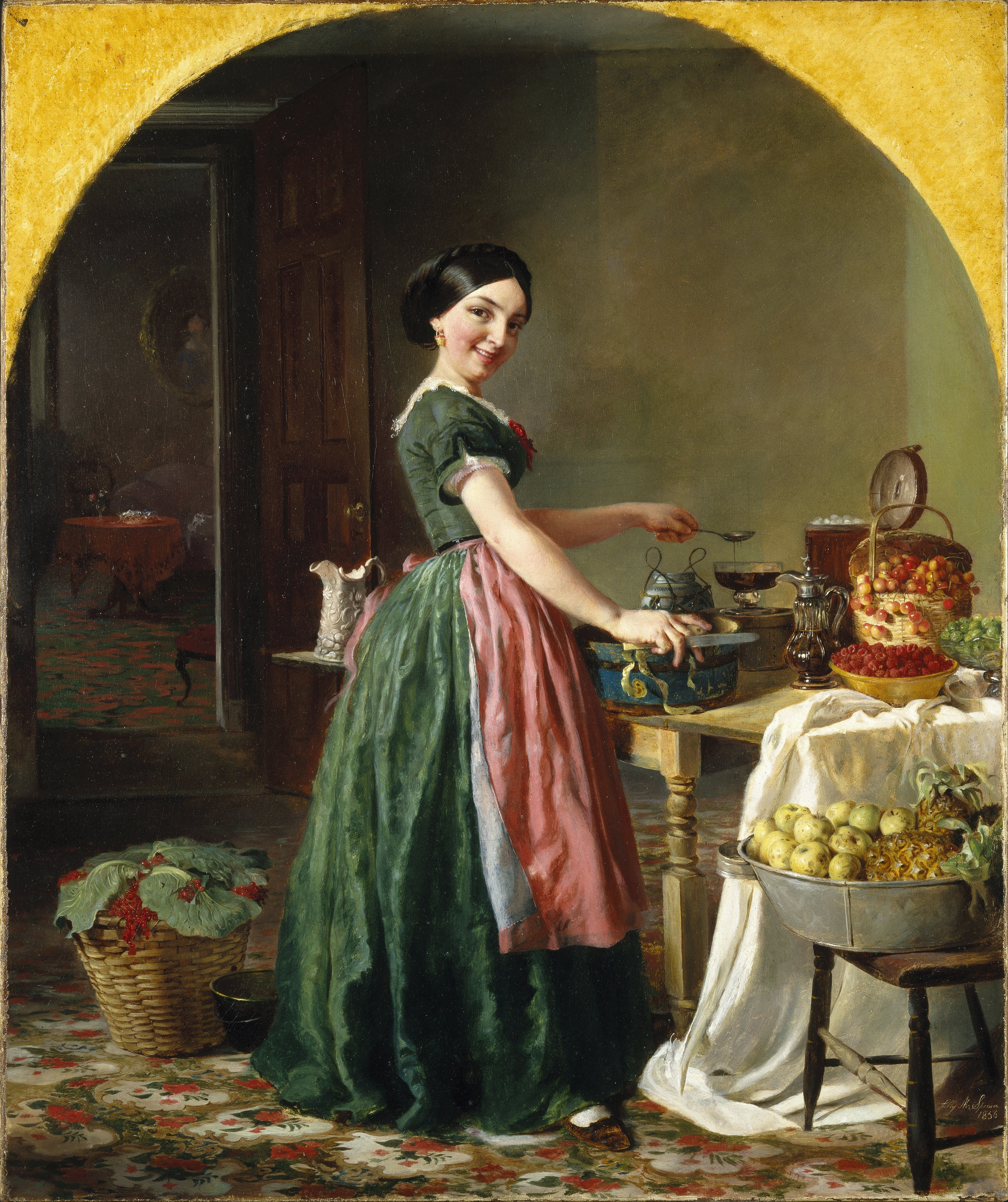
Kiss Me and You'll Kiss the 'Lasses (1856)

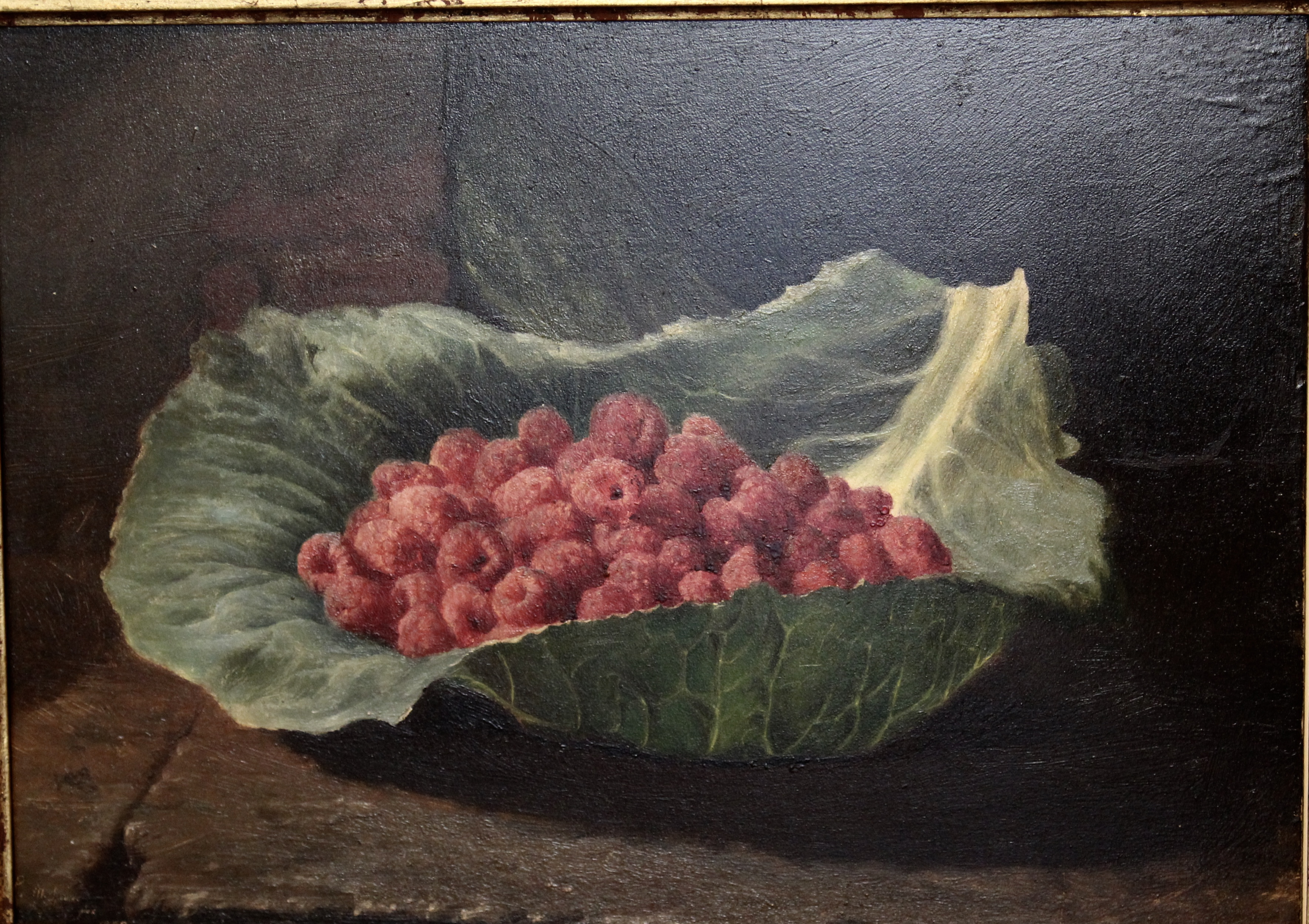
Raspberries on a Leaf (1858)

Spencer's paintings are generally oil on canvas, ranging in sizes from as large as 72"x50" to as small as 16"x11". Her themes were drawn from close to home often depicting idealized children, Madonna-like mothers, happy housewives, and loveable, inept husbands. Her work has been considered “both ideological (encouraging accommodation to norms associated with the rising middle class) and utopian (resistant to class or gender domination). She was often influenced by etiquette books, which resulted in attention to details in the settings such as bowls of fruits and neatly designed flower arrangements. Etiquette also affected the activities of the picture's subjects—women were engaged in womanly activities and everyone played their heteronormative roles. Painted in a palette of bright, crisp colors, her canvases are refined in execution and smoothly finished, although in later years her brushstrokes became drier and looser. Her works were usually given short, catchy titles, undescriptive, but rather exclamations on the subject of the painting.

One main critique of her work is the variation in the size of the heads of her figures. Her reviewers often comment that the head is larger and disproportionate to the body size of the figures. Such pieces as Shake Hands? (1854), an oil on canvas with arched top, which now resides at the Ohio Historical Society, epitomizes Spencer’s unique style. The piece shows a buxom woman making dough in a homey kitchen adorned with domestic accommodations, such as a bowl of apples, and a chicken. Her skirt is tied back, presumably to keep it clean. Pausing from her activity, and smiling broadly, the doughy-handed woman reaches out to greet a visitor, seemingly the viewer. The title demonstrates Spencer's standard wit: shaking hands is the last thing someone would want to do while working with dough. It also has a deeper meaning concerning equality. Shaking hands is a symbol of male equality and was "fundamental to males citizens' sense of status." Here a woman is making her claim to equality, though it is a limited equality rooted in a domestic sphere. Spencer does make the women's sphere separate. The dark spaces make the room appear closed off, separating the women's sphere from the more public male sphere. However it is not necessarily a negative message, this painting shows a Utopian kitchen. The message is that a woman in her sphere “accommodates the status quo and attempts to invest it with new meaning."

== Selected works ==
- The Little Navigator (1848)
- Domestic Happiness (1848), Detroit Institute of Arts
- The Young Teacher (1848)
- Life's Happy Hour (1849)
- The Jolly Washerwoman (1851), Hood Museum of Art
- Peeling Onions (1852), Memorial Art Gallery, Rochester, NY
- Reading the Legend (1852), Smith College Museum of Art
- The Young Husband: First Marketing (1854)
- Shake Hands? (1854), Ohio Historical Society
- Clap Hands (1855)
- The Forsaken (1856), The Smithsonian Collection L.M Spencer exhibit (1973), location currently unknown
- The Young Wife: First Stew (1856)
- Kiss Me and You'll Kiss the 'Lasses (1856), Brooklyn Museum of Art
- This Little Pig Went to the Market (1857)
- Fi!Fo!Fum! (1858)
- Raspberries on a Leaf (1858), Collection: Widener University Alfred O. Deshong Collection
- Grandpa's Prodigies (1860)
- Jane Eleanor Sherman Lacey and Her Son Edward (1860), Taubman Museum of Art, Roanoke, Virginia
- War Spirit at Home: Celebrating the Battle at Vicksburg (1866)
- Mother and Child by the Hearth (1867)
- We Both Must Fade (Mrs. Fithian) (1869), Smithsonian American Art Museum
- Old Man with Two Children (1845), Collection: purchased at auction in 1958 by the Ohio Historical Center, Columbus.
- Peeling Onions (1848–1852) Collection: Hirschl & Adler Galleries, New York; to Closson Galleries, Cincinnati; to Munson-Williams-Proctor Institute, Utica
- Self-Portrait (ca. 1841), Collections: Mrs. Pierre A. G. Spencer; in 1947 to the Ohio Historical Center, Columbus
- Shepherdess Mending Stockings (1844–1848), Collections: Mrs. William E. Smith, Oxford, Ohio (1953); given by Mrs. Smith in 1870 to the Ohio Historical Center
- Young Women in a Seventeenth-Century Costume (1845), Collection: Mrs. Mary Abrams, Llewellyn Park, New Jersey
- Child Playing with Fish Bowl (1856), Collection: Victor Sparks, New York; to Mrs. George L. Cohen, New York; given by Mrs. Cohen in 1966 to the Newark Museum
- Choose Between (ca. 1857), Collections: John Mitchell, New York; to Victor Spark (1946); private owner; Victor Spark, New York
- Peeling Onions (ca. 1852), Collection: Mr. and Mrs. William Postar, Boston
- Reading the Legend (1852), Collections: Visitor Spark, New York (1843); to M. Knoedler &Co.; to Caroline R. and Adeline F. Wing; given by the Misses Wing in 1954 to the Smith College Museum of Art, Northampton, Massachusetts

== Exhibitions ==
- St. Luke's Episcopal Church (Marietta, Ohio), Rectory. 1841
- Metropolitan Museum of Art. Life in America: A Special Loan Exhibition of Paintings, April 24-October 29, 1939.
- Corcoran Gallery of Art (Washington, D.C.) American Processional: The Story of Our Country, July 8-December 17, 1950
- Currier Art Gallery of Art (Manchester, New Hampshire) 19th Century American Painting from the Collection of Henry Melville Fuller, September 18-October 17, 1971
- Walter Art Gallery (Baltimore). Old Mistresses: Women Artists of the Past, April 17- June 18, 1972
- Brooklyn Museum (Brooklyn, New York) Kiss Me and You'll Kiss the 'Lasses
- National Academy of Design
- Women's Pavilion of the Philadelphia Centennial Exhibition in 1876

== Bibliography ==
- Bolton-Smith, Robin; Truettner, William H. (1973). Lilly Martin Spencer, 1822–1902: The Joys of Sentiment. Washington, D.C.: Smithsonian Institution Press.
- Johns, Elizabeth (1991). American Genre Painting: The Politics of Everyday Life. London: Yale University Press.
- Katz, Wendy Jean (2002). Regionalism and Reform: Art and Class Formation in Antebellum Cincinnati. Columbus: Ohio State University Press.
- Lubin, David M. (1994). Picturing a Nation: Art and Social Change in Nineteenth-Century America. London: Yale University Press.
