= Rebecca Worthley =

English singer-songwriter

Rebecca Worthley (born 1981) is an English singer-songwriter from Exeter, Devon, England.

Worthley recorded her first album, Myths and Elegies, in 2005. The album was voted one of the top 25 independent albums of 2006 by indie-music.com. The following year she met music producer Mark Hill who helped produce her 2006 eponymously titled EP. The acoustic version of Worthley's song "Consumed", which is recorded on both CDs, was used that year on a YouTube video about sweatshop labor. In April 2007, Worthley was the first musician to perform on SofaGig, an online music venue. She was the only musician from outside Plymouth invited to perform for The Still Sessions at Plymouth Gin Distillery for an acoustic compilation album. Rebecca has also received national airplay on BBC Radio 2, and performed a live session with Radio 2 producer Bob Harris on 17 February 2007. Her new album Morning Comes to Those Who Wait was released on Peppy Records in June 2008 and features two tracks by producer Sean Genockey.

In addition to singing, Worthley plays banjo, musical box, singing bowl and classical and acoustic guitars. Her musical style has been likened to that of Joni Mitchell.

== Discography ==
- 2005: Myths and Elegies
- 2006: Rebecca Worthley (EP)
- 2008: Morning Comes to Those Who Wait
