= Harrison Dax Nash =

British social worker and humanitarian

Harrison Dax Nash BEM
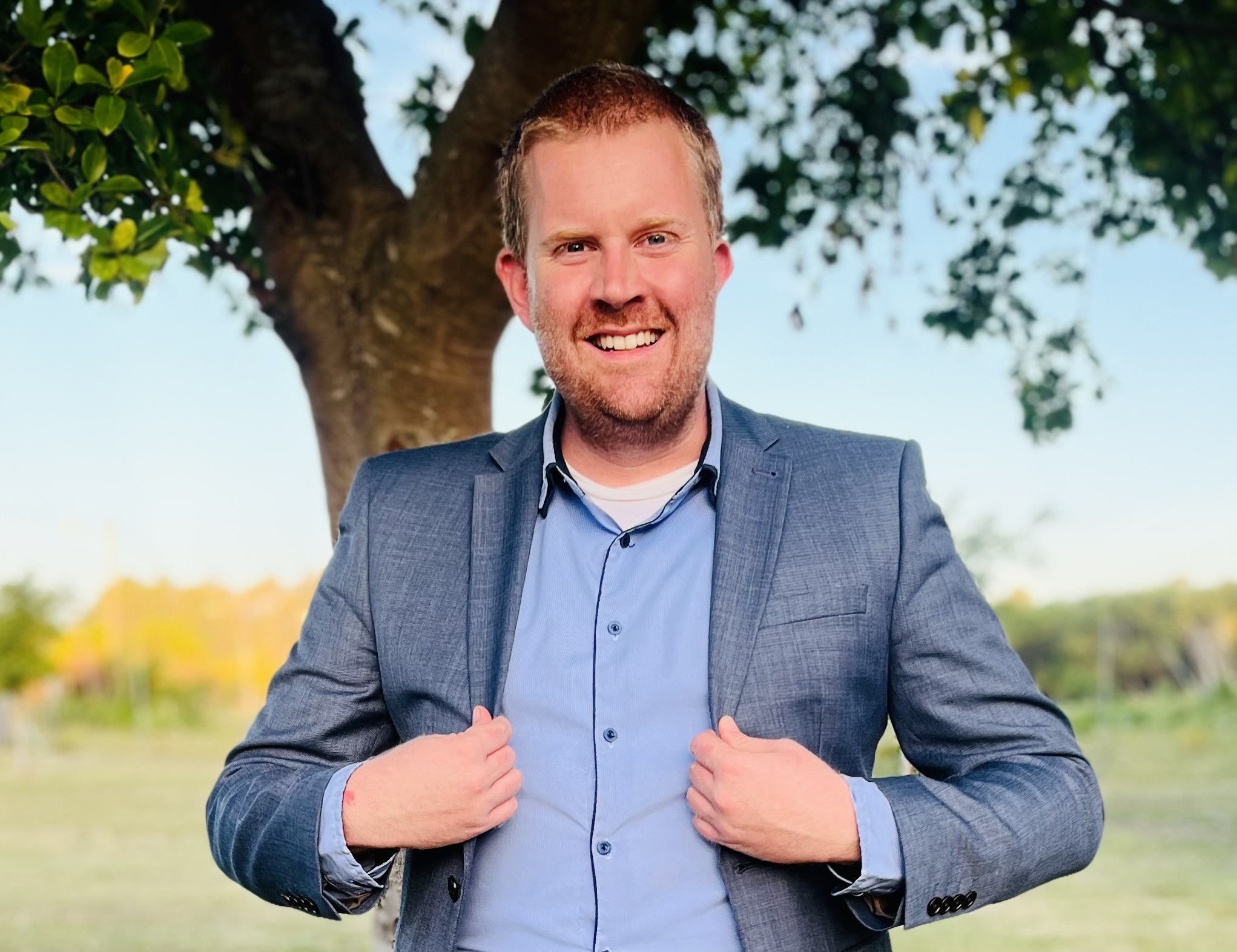
- Nash in 2025
- Born: Plymouth, Devon, England
- Education: University of Plymouth
- Occupations: Social Worker; Charity Director
- Known for: Founder of Maranatha Care Children
- Awards: British Empire Medal (2020 New Year Honours)
- Website: maranathacarechildren.com

Harrison Dax Nash is a British social worker and charity founder known for his work in South Africa with vulnerable children. He is the founder of the UK-registered charity Maranatha Care Children and has received both the British Empire Medal (BEM) and the British Citizen Award (BCA) for services to disadvantaged youth.

== Early life and education ==
Nash was born in Plymouth, England, and attended Devonport High School for Boys.

He studied social work at the University of Plymouth, graduating in 2011. He is now an honorary lecturer at the University.

== Career ==
In 2007, Nash travelled to South Africa as a volunteer.

He then founded the charity Maranatha Care Children in 2009 to support youth development projects in the Eastern Cape.

After completing his degree, Nash relocated to South Africa, where he worked for more than a decade as Programme Manager and Social Work Supervisor at the Maranatha-Siyakatala Child and Youth Care Centre (project of Maranatha Streetworkers Trust) in Gqeberha.

His work has included residential care practice, programme development, and supporting young people into education and employment.

== Honours and awards ==
- British Citizen Award (BCA) for services to children and young people (2016).
- British Empire Medal (BEM) in the 2020 Queen’s Honours List.
- University of Plymouth Alumni Lifetime Achievement Award (2025).

== Media coverage ==
Nash has been featured in regional and national media, including BBC Spotlight, BBC Radio Devon, Algoa FM, Die Burger, The Herald (South Africa) and The Herald (Plymouth).
