= Robert Stone (composer) =

English composer

Robert Stone (1516 – 2 July 1613) was an English composer and member of the Chapel Royal.

He was born in Alphington, Devon, England. His name is recorded as a member of the Chapel Royal in 1546 as a yeoman, though he was later promoted to a gentleman; he remained active there into the seventeenth century. At the coronation of James I, he was fourth in seniority, senior to William Byrd.

Among his best-known works is the setting of the Lord's Prayer, written around 1550. It was first printed by John Day in Certaine Notes (1565) and its free rhythmic structure resembles the French vers mesuré.
