= Chidera Eggerue =

British blogger and writer (born 1994)

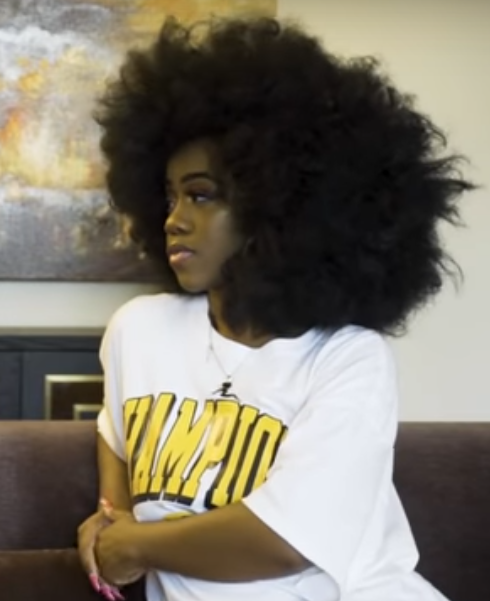
- Eggerue in November 2017
- Born: December 1994 (age 31)
- Occupations: Writer, speaker
- Writing career
- Pen name: The Slumflower
- Years active: 2017-present
- Genre: Self-help
- Subjects: Self-love, fashion
- Notable work: What a Time to Be Alone
- Website: www.theslumflower.com

Chidera Eggerue (pen name, The Slumflower) is a British Nigerian writer and fashion blogger. She is best known for her book, What a Time to Be Alone, and the online campaign #SaggyBoobsMatter.

== Early life ==
Eggerue was raised in Southeast London in Peckham, a neighborhood that is mostly British Nigerian. Eggerue attended Goose Green Primary School, in East Dulwich. Eggerue then moved on to Notre Dame School for her secondary education. Her family is Igbo. She attended college to study fashion design but was unable to finish her degree due to depression.

== Career ==
In 2017, Eggerue started #SaggyBoobsMatter, a hashtag that gained prominence on Twitter and Instagram, to challenge the convention that women with large breasts must wear a bra if their breasts sag. As a teenager she felt insecure because her breasts did not look like a model on the packaging of her first bra. She later decided to embrace her shape and posted a picture wearing a dress without a bra in September 2017, using the hashtag. According to Eggerue, "“There is enough room for everybody in the body positivity movement. But we must work together to make room for those more marginalised than us.” Eggerue has received backlash to the campaign. Early in 2018, one of her braless photos was turned into a meme that referred to her and another black woman as unattractive.

She then started a blog called The Slumflower to highlight fashion that is not covered within the mainstream. The name refers to the concept of a rose growing from concrete, and comes from the short film created by creative duo Street Etiquette. The blog features modern street style fashions that are affordable. She also writes on topics like friendship, dating, racism, and sexism.

=== Film and television ===
In early 2018, she hosted a Newsbeat documentary that explored hair loss and her own experiences with traction alopecia. She cites Munroe Bergdorf, Reni Eddo-Lodge and Chimamanda Ngozi Adichie as her biggest inspirations. She was the creative director for Innclusive, a home rental organization that caters to a multiracial audience.

In January 2020 she presented a Channel 4 documentary Bring Back the Bush, examining why women shave their pubic hair.

=== Books ===
After being encouraged by her digital followers, Eggerue created a zine in Adobe InDesign with advice on self-love. After positive reception, she started looking for a publisher. Eggerue published a book called What a Time to be Alone: The Slumflower's Guide to Why You Are Already Enough in July 2018 under Quadrille Publishing. A few days after publication the book became a Sunday Times bestseller. The book focuses on self-love and contains advice on how young women can be happy alone. Eggerue uses Igbo proverbs throughout the book. She recorded a Tedx Talk about self-love named after the book the same month it was released.

In February 2020 she published How To Get Over A Boy, a self-help book that gives advice on dating.

== Works ==
- 2018. What a Time to be Alone: The Slumflower's guide to why you are already enough. Publication date 26 July 2018, Quadrille Publishing. ISBN 9781787133143
- 2020. How To Get Over A Boy. Publication date 6 February 2020, Hardie Grant Publishing. ISBN 9781787134812

== Accolades ==
- 2018 - BBC, 100 Women
