= Alexis Kirke =

British composer and filmmaker

Alexis Kirke is a composer and filmmaker known for his interdisciplinary practice. He has been called "the Philip K. Dick of contemporary music". Alexis is British and lives in Plymouth, in South West England. Alexis says he takes his inspiration from both the Arts and from Science/Technology – and has two doctorates – one from each of those Faculties at Plymouth University. In particular, his highest profile work has been motivated by interests in quantum mechanics, marine science, regulated share markets and artificial intelligence. Alexis is senior research fellow at the Interdisciplinary Centre for Computer Music Research at the Plymouth University, and is composer-in-residence for the Plymouth Marine Institute.

== Sound projects ==
Alexis' most recent musical projects have involved the use of controlled quantum dynamics to create quantum computer music. His first in this field was Superposition, a collaboration with the University of Southern California, a live duet between acclaimed Mezzo Soprano Juliette Pochin and the D-Wave quantum annealer installed at USC. Alexis' follow-up performance using the D-Wave was Entangled Brains - for which he developed a computer music system that entangled the brainwave data of two performers wearing EEG headsets. The resulting data from the D-Wave's calculations on the pair's brainwaves was used to drive an electronic music performance. Kirke switched his attention to actual gate-based quantum computers, delivering Teleporting from Westeros, the first live performance utilizing algorithms shown to have a quantum advantage: a teleportation-based multi-agent system where agents use Grover's algorithm to interact with a human musician.

Alexis also celebrated the 60th Anniversary of Lennon and McCartney meeting with Come Together. Other projects in recent years include Bat Wars: The Four Awaken, in which a violinist and pianist duet with a live AI-generated script based on characters from iconic movies, Conducting Shakespeare, wherein he remixed Shakespeare live for two actors at the Victoria and Albert Museum, based on the real-time bio-signal readings of four audience members; and Remember a Day, which was a collaboration with a lady with Alzheimer's setting her daily plan and medication reminders to music as an aid to memory, and performing the tunes as part of a piece for mezzo-soprano, cello and electronics.

Prior to that Alexis created Sound-Wave, wherein he turned a wave tank into a giant musical instrument for the opening of the Plymouth Marine Institute building by the Duke of Edinburgh; and the financial "reality opera" Open Outcry, in which performers trade real money by singing, sponsored by Barclays.

Alexis initially gained recognition for his performance Sunlight Symphony, which turned the University of Plymouth's iconic Roland Levinsky Building into a musical instrument played by the rising sun. His first performance supported by Plymouth Marine Institute was Fast Travel, in which a saxophonist interacted with live artificially-intelligent whale schools. Other prominent works include Cloud Chamber with a violinist playing a duet with subatomic particles in real-time – and Insight in which Alexis (who has the harmless visual condition palinopsia) simulated his hallucinations live on an iPad, which were turned into sound accompanied by a flautist.

Alexis has collaborated with composers and performers such as John Matthias, Eduardo Reck Miranda, DJ Pierre, Lola Perrin, and Martyn Ware.

== Film projects ==
Alexis' best known film project is the writing, directing, and soundtracking of the short film Many Worlds (2013) – a 15-minute movie about a human version of a Schrodinger's Suicide experiment. The movie has four possible scripts, with four possible endings. All four scripts were filmed, and then bio-signals are collected from a sample of the audience live during the screening; a computer used this data to select live which version of the film is shown at any moment, depending on how bored or interested the audience is at the time. The film has premiered at the Peninsula Arts Contemporary Music Festival 2013, had invited showings in Israel and at BBC Research and Development, and won a Media Innovation Award in 2014.

Alexis' second short film in 2017 was "Buddha of Superposition", an 11-minute short that uses innovative visual and sound techniques to take the viewer inside of the experience of psychosis. The film features actor Lois Meleri-Jones.

== See also ==
- Digital poetry
- Experimental musical instrument
