= Beryl Cook =

British artist (1926–2008)

Beryl Cook OBE
- Beryl Cook in her studio
- Born: Beryl Francis Lansley; 10 September 1926; Egham, Surrey, England
- Died: 28 May 2008 (aged 81); Plymouth, Devon, England
- Known for: Painting
- Movement: Naive art
- Awards: OBE (1995)
- Website: ourberylcook.com

Beryl Cook, OBE (10 September 1926 – 28 May 2008) was a British painter. Often comical, her works pictured people whom she encountered in everyday life, including people enjoying themselves in pubs, girls shopping or out on a hen night, drag queen shows or a family picnicking by the seaside or abroad. She had no formal training and did not take up painting until her thirties. She was a shy and private person, and in her work often depicted flamboyant and extrovert characters very different from herself. Although widely popular and recognised as one of the best-known contemporary British artists, Cook was never accepted by the art establishment.

Since her death in 2008, Beryl's son John and granddaughter Sophie have run the official Beryl Cook website providing insights into her life.

== Life and career ==
=== Early life ===
Beryl Francis Lansley (later, Cook) was born on 10 September 1926 in Egham, Surrey, one of four sisters. Her parents, Adrian S. B. Lansley and Ella Farmer-Francis, separated very early, and her mother moved to Reading, Berkshire, with her daughters.

Cook attended Kendrick School in Reading, but left education at fourteen and started to work in a variety of jobs.

Cook moved to London towards the end of the Second World War. There, she tried working as a model and showgirl.

In 1948, Cook married her childhood friend John Cook, who was in the merchant navy. When he retired from seafaring, they briefly ran a pub in Stoke-by-Nayland, Suffolk. Their son John was born in 1950, and in 1956, the family left to live in Southern Rhodesia (now Zimbabwe). They remained in Africa for the next decade, where in 1960, Cook produced her first painting, Hangover, after picking up her son's paint set.

=== Return to England ===
Beryl Cook, Tea in the Garden

The Cook family returned to England in the mid-1960s, and in 1965, moved to East Looe, Cornwall, where Beryl focused more on her painting. She would work on old boards, cardboard and driftwood.

In 1968, the Cook family moved to Plymouth, where they bought a guest house on the Hoe. Cook divided her time between running the guest house and painting.

In the mid-1970s, Cook's works caught the attention of one of their guests, who put her in touch with the management of Plymouth Arts Centre. The director, Bernard Samuel's, persuaded her to have her first public exhibition there, which took place in November 1975. The show resulted in a magazine cover feature in The Sunday Times. This was followed by a 1976 exhibition at the Portal Gallery in London, who would represent her and exhibit her work regularly until her death. She soon became, according to Julian Spalding, the most genuinely popular living artist in Britain.

Cook's first book of collected works was published by John Murray in 1978. From then until the early 2000s, she regularly published books of her own art, such as Beryl Cook's New York (1985), which had been inspired by her three-week visit to New York City in 1983. Cook all collaborated with authors such as Edward Lucie-Smith and Nanette Newman, providing illustrations for their books.

In 1995, she was awarded the Order of the British Empire. She did not attend the official ceremony, due to her shyness, accepting the honour at a quieter ceremony in Plymouth the following year. The Royal Mail reproduced one of her paintings as a first-class postage stamp.

Whilst Cook gained public popularity, the art world often looked down on her work. In 1996, former Tate director Nicholas Serota declared that "There will be no Beryl Cooks in Tate Modern". As of 2025, the Tate held none of the artists works in their collection. However, Cook loved that ordinary people loved her work, and would reply personally to hundreds of letters she received from fans of her work.

Broadcast in February 2004, Tiger Aspect Productions made two animated films called Bosom Pals using characters from her paintings, voiced by Dawn French, Rosemary Leach, Alison Steadman, and Timothy Spall. Bad health and the Bristol hills, made her reluctantly return after 25 years to Plymouth in 2002. Beryl Cook died on 28 May 2008 at home in Plymouth. Peninsula Arts of the Plymouth University mounted a major retrospective exhibition in November that year. Two books devoted to her were published: Beryl Cook 1926-2008 and The World of Beryl Cook. In January 2026, a major retrospective of Cook's work was held at The Box in Plymouth to mark the centenary of her birth. It was the most extensive presentation of her work to date, and featured works that had rarely or never been previously exhibited.

== Work ==
Cook admired the work of the English artist Stanley Spencer for her compositions and bold bulky figures. Another influence was Edward Burra, who painted sleazy cafés, nightclubs, gay bars, sailors and prostitutes, although, unlike Burra, she did not paint the disturbing aspects of such scenes. She had an almost photographic memory.

Her work has been compared to that of Colombian artist Fernando Botero.

== Awards and recognition ==
Cook was awarded several prizes for her work, including:

- 1994: Best-Selling Published Artist Award, Fine Art Trade Guild
- 1995: Order of the British Empire

Cook and her work have also been covered on several television shows including:

- 1979: a film was made for LWT's The South Bank Show in which she discussed her work with Melvyn Bragg.
- 2005: Channel 4 News produced a short film on Beryl and her work.
- 2006: Featured artist on BBC Two's The Culture Show.

== Exhibitions ==
=== Solo ===
Year	Title	Institution	Location	Ref
1975		Plymouth Arts Centre	Plymouth	
1976		Portal Gallery	London	
2008		Peninsula Arts	Plymouth	
2026		The Box	Plymouth	

=== Group ===
Year	Title	Institution	Location	Notes	Ref
2002	Golden Jubilee exhibition		London	Showing her work The Royal Couple	
2010	Rude Britannia	Tate Britain	London		
2024		Studio Voltaire		With work by Tom of Finland	

== Collections ==
Cook's works are in a number of public collections, including:

- Gallery of Modern Art, Glasgow
- Bristol City Museum and Art Gallery
- Plymouth Art Gallery
- Durham Museum

== Publications ==
- The Works (John Murray, 1978) (Penguin Books, 1979; ISBN 0-14-00-5343-3)
- Private View (John Murray, 1980)
- Seven Years and a Day (with Colette O'Hare) (Collins, 1980)
- One Man Show (John Murray, 1981)
- Bertie and the Big Red Ball (with Edward Lucie-Smith) (John Murray, 1982)
- My Granny Was a Frightful Bore (with Nanette Newman) (Collins, 1983)
- Beryl Cook's New York (John Murray, 1985)
- On the Town (with Edward Lucie-Smith) (Devon Books, 1988)
- Beryl Cook's London (John Murray, 1988)
- Bouncers (Victor Gollancz, 1991)
- Happy Days (Victor Gollancz, 1995)
- Cruising (Victor Gollancz, 2000)
- The Bumper Edition (Victor Gollancz, 2000)
