= Peter Nelson (composer) =

Scottish composer, theorist, and academic (born 1951)

- Born: 17 May 1951 (age 75); Glasgow, Scotland
- Genres: algorithmic composition; avant-garde; classical; electronic
- Occupations: academic; composer; music theorist
- Years active: 1980–present
- Awards: Honorary Doctorate, National and Kapodistrian University of Athens (2024)
- Website: ECA Faculty Profile
- Title: Emeritus Professor of Music and Technology

Academic background
- Education: University of Glasgow (MA)
- Influences: Iannis Xenakis

Academic work
- Institutions: University of Edinburgh; University of Nottingham
- Doctoral students: Stuart MacRae; Eduardo Reck Miranda; Derek Williams

Peter Nelson (born 17 May 1951) is a Scottish composer, theorist, and academic. He is Emeritus Professor of Music and Technology at the University of Edinburgh and for nearly three decades, he served as the Editor-in-Chief of the international peer-reviewed journal Contemporary Music Review. Nelson is known for his contributions to music technology, algorithmic composition, and his historical work alongside Iannis Xenakis on the UPIC graphical computer music system.

== Early life and education ==
Nelson was born in Glasgow, Scotland. He completed his early higher education at the University of Glasgow, graduating with a Master of Arts. He also attended composition classes with György Ligeti (Centre Acanthes), Brian Ferneyhough, Helmut Lachenmann and Cristóbal Halffter (Darmstädter Ferienkurse), and conducting with George Hurst (Canford Summer School) and Peter Eötvos (Centre Acanthes). His orchestral work, Into the Purple was selected for the International Gaudeamus Music Week, 1977, and performed by the Netherlands Radio Chamber Orchestra conducted by Ernest Bour. Nelson pursued further academic research at the University of Edinburgh and the Massachusetts Institute of Technology (MIT). During the 1980s, he collaborated with composer Iannis Xenakis in Paris, contributing to Xenakis's UPIC graphical computer music system as an associate of Les Ateliers UPIC, giving public workshops and writing a number of works for the UPIC.

== Academic career ==
Before joining the University of Edinburgh, Nelson served as a lecturer and as the Director of the Electronic Music Studio at both the University of Glasgow and the University of Nottingham, where his composition students included composers Laurence Crane and Graham Fitkin.

In 1986, Nelson joined the faculty at the University of Edinburgh, establishing a long-standing tenure at the Edinburgh College of Art (ECA) and the university's music department. His teaching and research focus on music technology, music theory, and the social aesthetics of musical composition. He established a research group in music and artificial intelligence, and was one of the initiators of the Institute for Music in Human and Social Development. Over his academic career, Nelson supervised numerous composers and musicians.

In addition to his teaching duties, Nelson was appointed Editor-in-Chief of the journal Contemporary Music Review in 1993, a position he held until 2022, steering the publication's focus toward global avant-garde, electronic, and experimental music movements. He was also a co-founder of the Edinburgh Contemporary Arts Trust (ECAT), which presented international avant-garde concert series in Scotland for thirty years. In 2014, Nelson was a keynote speaker at the International Computer Music Conference. In 2024 he was awarded an honorary doctorate by the National and Kapodistrian University of Athens for services to music.

== Composition and research ==
As a composer, Nelson’s work spans acoustic, electronic, and algorithmic mediums, often integrating complex mathematical models and computer-aided synthesis systems. His theoretical research focuses primarily on the concepts of musical time, spatialisation, and the semantic structures of sound. His publications include the 2024 collaborative text Meta-Xenakis: New Perspectives on Iannis Xenakis’s Life, Work, and Legacies (co-edited with Sharon Kanach) and a number of book chapters and articles including Music as silence (2025). Nelson has been Chair of the Board of Red Note Ensemble since 2026. The world premiere of his Symphony in Three Movements commissioned by the New Edinburgh Orchestra is programmed for performance in December 2026.

== Academic mentorship ==
Over his academic tenures at the University of Nottingham and the University of Edinburgh, Nelson supervised and taught numerous contemporary composers and musicologists, including:

- Edward Campbell, Emeritus Professor of Music, University of Aberdeen
- Laurence Crane, contemporary classical composer (at Nottingham)
- Graham Fitkin, minimalist and postminimalist composer (at Nottingham)
- Emma Jane Lloyd, violinist, composer, and experimental artist
- Stuart MacRae, contemporary classical composer
- Stephen Malloch, musicologist and co-developer of the theory of communicative musicality (PhD at Edinburgh, 1997)
- Aggelos Mastrantonis, contemporary classical composer and Emre Araci Prize winner (PhD at Edinburgh, 2021)
- Eduardo Reck Miranda, professor and head of the Interdisciplinary Centre for Computer Music Research (ICCMR) University of Plymouth.
- Rebecca Saunders, contemporary classical composer
- Franziska Schroeder, Professor, School of Arts, English and Languages, Queen's University, Belfast
- Dimitrios Skyllas, contemporary classical composer (MSc at Edinburgh)
- Michèle Weiland, professor and Met Office Joint Chair, Edinburgh Parallel Computing Centre (EPCC)
- Derek Williams, orchestrator, conductor, and composer (PhD at Edinburgh)

== Selected works ==
Nelson's compositions span acoustic, electronic, and algorithmic mediums. Commissioning and performing organisations include:

- The BBC and BBC Scottish Symphony Orchestra
- Radio France
- The Edinburgh International Festival
- The Scottish Chamber Orchestra and the Edinburgh Quartet
- The Dunedin Consort

Selected works include:

- Fictive Music
- Into The Purple
- Punte/Viste
- Tournoiements de Spectres
- Dance Variations
- Symphony in Three Movements

== Selected publications ==
- 'The UPIC System of Iannis Xenakis: autoethnography as rapprochement'
- 'The voice of the UPIC: technology and virtual agency'
- 'György Ligeti, Friction, and the Uncertain Image'
- 'The Voice of the UPIC: technology as utterance'
- 'Speech Acts and Music Acts: intentionality in language and music'
- 'The Technological Dimension: From the Études to IRCAM'
- 'Celestial and Terrestrial Music: the spectacular art of Iannis Xenakis and the formation of the UPIC'
- 'Music and the Illusions of Form'
- 'What’s the Use of Music?'

== Honours and recognition ==
- 2014 – Keynote Speaker, International Computer Music Conference (Athens, Greece)
- 2017 – Fellow, Bogliasco Foundation
- 2024 – Honorary Doctorate, National and Kapodistrian University of Athens
