= Helen Eugenia Hagan =

American composer and pianist (1891–1964)

- Born: January 10, 1891; Portsmouth, New Hampshire, U.S.
- Died: March 6, 1964 (aged 73); New York, New York, U.S.
- Education: Yale School of Music
- Occupations: Composer, pianist

Helen Eugenia Hagan (January 10, 1891 – March 6, 1964) was an American composer, pianist and music educator of African descent.

== Life ==
Helen Eugenia Hagan was born in Portsmouth, New Hampshire, the daughter of John A. and Mary Estella Neal Hagan. She studied piano with her mother and then in the public schools of New Haven, Connecticut. Around the age of nine, she began playing organ for the Dixwell Avenue Congregational United Church in New Haven.

She studied at Yale School of Music with pianist H Stanley Knight and composer Horatio Parker, graduating in 1912 with a bachelor's degree in music. In doing so, she became the first known African American woman to earn a Yale degree.

She performed as soloist on her own Piano Concerto in C Minor in May 1912 with the New Haven Symphony Orchestra conducted by Parker. She received the Samuel Simmons Stanford scholarship to study in Paris, with Blanche Selva and Vincent d'Indy, and graduated from Schola Cantorum in 1914.

Hagan returned to the United States as World War I began and began a career as a concert pianist, touring from 1915 to 1918. In 1918 she was music director (i.e. music department chair) at Tennessee Agricultural and Industrial State College. In early 1919 she left for France to entertain black troops of the American Expeditionary Forces, along with spirituals singer Joshua Blanton and the Rev. Henry Hugh Proctor, under the auspices of the YMCA. General John Pershing personally requested that Ms. Hagan entertain the troops.

Among 1915 performances were those in Cedar Rapids (IA) in March and Wheeling (WV) in May. In February 1916 she performed in St. Joseph (MO). A 1917 Tulsa newspaper article publicizing her 12 February appearance there excerpted Hagen's recent reviews from Chicago, Quincy (IL), Dallas, Mobile, Birmingham (AL), Parkersburg (WV), and New Haven. In 1923 her western touring included Denver (September) and Omaha (November).

In 1920 Hagan married John Taylor Williams of Morristown, New Jersey but continued her concert career. She filed for divorce in February 1925: "The well known physician is alleged to have broken a bone in the hand of his wife, papers in the suit set forth"…."she has been compelled to give up concert work since the fracture of her hand." They divorced ca. 1931.

She had a music studio in Morristown for at least a decade and was the first African American woman admitted to the Morristown Chamber of Commerce. She taught at the Mendelssohn Conservatory of Music in Chicago and pursued a Masters of Arts degree from Teachers College, Columbia University. In 1932 took the position of dean of music at Bishop College in Marshall, Texas, where she served until September 1936. She also continued to work as a choir director and church organist. She died in New York City after an extended illness.

On September 29, 2016, a crowdfunded monument for Hagan's previously unmarked grave was unveiled at New Haven's Evergreen Cemetery, and the day was declared "Women Making Music Day" by New Haven mayor Toni Harp. The New Haven Symphony Orchestra's season opening concert that evening was performed in Ms. Hagan's honor.

The only known video footage of Helen Hagen is in the 1954 New York Board of Education documentary Let Us Break Bread Together, where she is shown performing in a school context.

== Works ==
The Piano Concerto is the only work by Helen Hagan to survive. In 2014 Lola Perrin and the Ivory Duo Piano Ensemble made a transcription from the 1912 manuscript to create a performable version in a piano reduction. In 2022, pianist Samantha Ege recorded a two piano version on her album Black Renaissance Woman. Composer and Yale School of Music alum Soomin Kim has re-orchestrated the work based on the existing sources. The new version was first performed by the Yale Philharmonia and Samantha Ege on October 21, 2022.

Her other compositions, including songs, piano pieces, a violin sonata (pre-1912), and string quartets, have all been lost. The New Haven Symphony Orchestra is an active advocate for Ms. Hagan's legacy and encourages anyone who might be in possession of a score or manuscript of her music to please contact the Symphony.
