= Roland Levinsky Building =

Building at the University of Plymouth

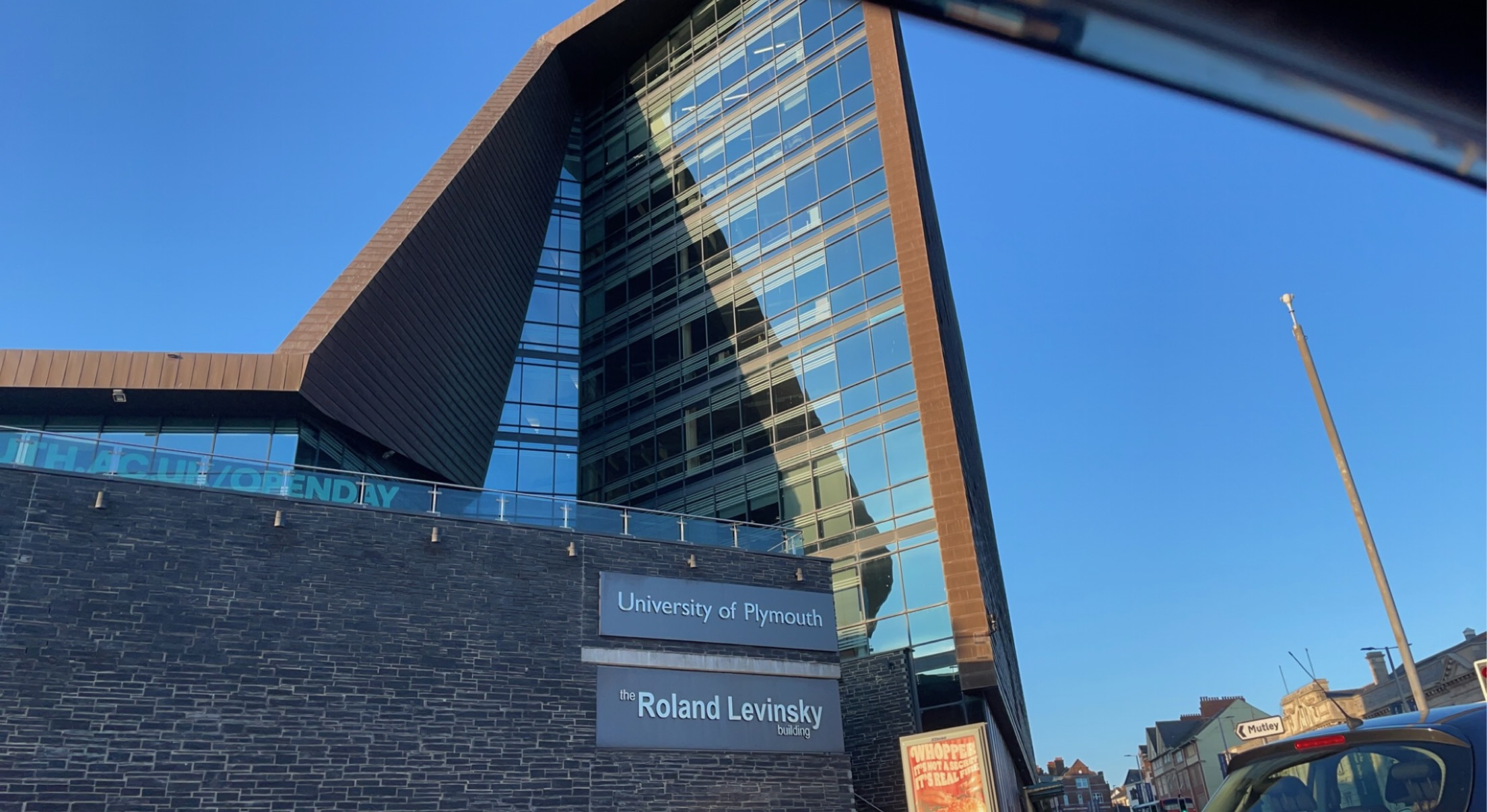
- Interactive map of the Roland Levinsky Building area

General information
- Type: Education
- Architectural style: Modern
- Location: Roland Levinsky Building, University of Plymouth, Drake Circus, Plymouth, England.
- Coordinates: 50.374121°N 4.138512°W
- Construction started: March 2005
- Completed: August 2007
- Cost: £34 million
- Owner: University of Plymouth

Technical details
- Structural system: Reinforced concrete
- Floor count: 9
- Floor area: 13,000 square metres (140,000 sq ft)

Design and construction
- Architects: Building Design Partnership, Henning Larsen Architects
- Structural engineer: Scott Wilson
- Main contractor: HBG Construction

The Roland Levinsky Building is the University of Plymouth's flagship arts, cultural and teaching facility, completed in 2007. It is located at the south of the university campus opposite the Drake Circus Shopping Centre.

== Background ==
The Roland Levinsky Building is the university's flagship building, hosting open days and large events. It is home to the Faculty of Arts.

The building is clad with copper sheets in a seamed-cladding technique, is nine storeys high and has 13,000 square metres (140,000 sq ft) of floor space. It contains a large four-storey atrium, open-plan studios and office space, as well as a number of specialist teaching laboratories. The building was featured in a study that demonstrated the possibility to simulate buildings’ predicted energy usage.

It was named in memory of Professor Roland Levinsky, academic researcher in biomedicine and vice-chancellor of the University of Plymouth, who was killed in an accident on New Year's Day 2007 after being touched by a live power cable that fell near his home during a storm.

== History ==
The building was designed by architects, Henning Larsen with Building Design Partnership. It has an overall modern and industrial theme. The design brief for the project called for a building that would give iconic status to the university and prove an inspiring symbol of the artistic and economic regeneration of the region.

Construction of the building began in early 2004 and was completed in August 2007 with the final construction costs reaching £34m.

During excavations, it was discovered that a leat was running through the proposed foundations of the building which could cause delays in construction. However, the building was completed as planned on schedule.

An open day was held on 9 August 2007 to showcase the building to local construction professionals, with the building being fully opened in September 2007.

In 2014, an expansion to the building was completed, called The House. It is not physically connected to the building but houses courses in the same faculty as the main building, and is designed to look very similar to the Roland Levinsky Building.

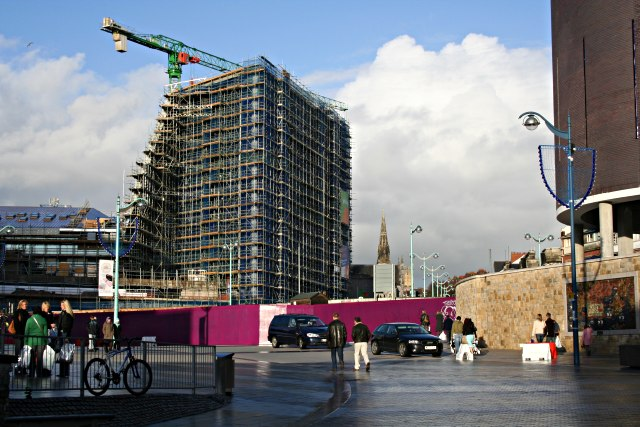
Roland Levinsky Building being built

In 2022 during a reshuffle of rooms in the building, the Levinsky Hall was opened as a new venue for classical music performances. In the same year, the ground floor of the main atrium was also renovated, the space was redesigned by students at the university. The space was designed to accommodate everyday student life and popup events. On 15 October 2022 the building was evacuated due to a bomb threat. A lecturer at the university said that they were told there was a bomb hidden inside a piano in the Levinsky Hall where an event was taking place. It was later confirmed to be a hoax created by youths attempting to disrupt the event.

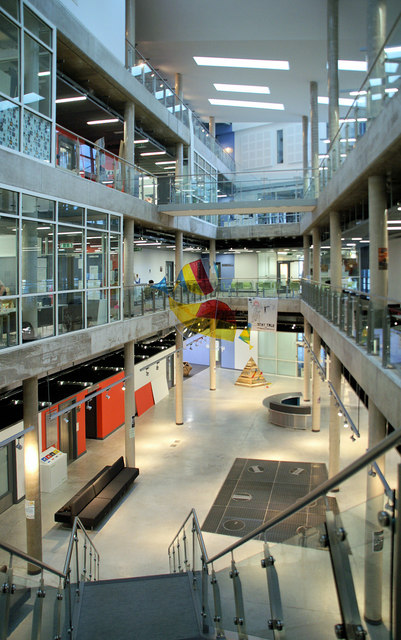
The main atrium

In April 2023, a cat from Ipswich climbed the building and got stuck on a ledge. The cat was rescued by a student calling a window cleaning company to get the cat down as the university's estates team did not have the correct type of ladder to reach it safely.

== Facilities ==
The building contains design studios, art studios, computer labs, and lecture theatres as well as the university's Digital Fabrication and Immersive Media Laboratories and architecture school.

The building also has a senate room designed by Rock Townsend. It was originally a classroom but was renovated into a senate-like chamber used for debates and talks.

=== The Arts Institute ===
The building has a large portion of its space dedicated to The Arts Institute including the Levinsky Gallery which takes up the lower floors in the tower of the building, the Levinsky Hall, and the Jill Craigie Cinema, which is a one screen cinema used by the film students

Many Arts Institute events have been held in the building, including the Sunny Symphony event, where sensors connected to a computer allowed the sunrise to compose music. The University of Plymouth Contemporary Music Festival uses the building as its main venue as well.

=== i-DAT ===
The Roland Levinsky Building also houses i-DAT, the university's Open Research Lab for experimentation with creative technology.

== Reception ==
The building was featured in the top 20 university buildings list after its completion, and has been featured in an article as one of the world's most "spectacular" university buildings.

=== Awards ===
Year	Award	Result	Ref
2007	Best New Building - Abercrombie Architectural Design Awards	Won	
2008	Structural Awards - Institution of Structural Engineers	Won	

=== Student protest ===
In 2007, students protested against the building when the fine art, 3D design and graphic design courses moved to Plymouth from the university's Exeter campus to consolidate the Faculty of Arts. Students said that studio space was cramped, and the ventilation system makes oil-based paints hazardous to use. The architects of the building blamed the university, saying that the building was never designed to accommodate so many departments.
