= Stuart MacRae (composer) =

Scottish composer & academic, born 1976

- Stuart MacRae (2026)
- Born: 12 August 1976 (age 50); Inverness, Scotland
- Citizenship: Scottish
- Awards: South Bank Sky Arts Award (2013)

Academic background
- Education: Durham University; Guildhall School of Music and Drama; University of Edinburgh (PhD)
- Doctoral advisor: Peter Nelson

Academic work
- Discipline: Composition, contemporary opera
- Institutions: Royal Conservatoire of Scotland
- Notable works: Ghost Patrol (2012); Anthropocene (2019)
- Website: stuartmacrae.com

Stuart MacRae (born 12 August 1976) is a Scottish composer and academic whose work spans contemporary classical music, modern opera, and large ensemble works. He received national commissions in his early twenties from the BBC and the London Sinfonietta, later serving as the Composer-in-Association with the BBC Scottish Symphony Orchestra. MacRae has established a long-standing creative partnership with librettist Louise Welsh, resulting in operas such as Ghost Patrol, which won the 2013 South Bank Sky Arts Award for Opera—and Anthropocene (2019) for Scottish Opera. He holds a PhD from the University of Edinburgh and serves on the senior faculty of the Royal Conservatoire of Scotland as a Lecturer in Composition.

== Career ==
=== Education and early work ===
Stuart MacRae was born in Inverness, Scotland. He studied music at Durham University under Philip Cashian and Michael Zev Gordon, and subsequently pursued postgraduate studies under Simon Bainbridge and Robert Saxton at the Guildhall School of Music and Drama. By his mid-twenties, MacRae began receiving commissions from national ensembles including the BBC and the London Sinfonietta, and was appointed Composer-in-Association with the BBC Scottish Symphony Orchestra. MacRae's compositional style draws on various strands of European modernism, citing the works of Igor Stravinsky, Elliott Carter, Iannis Xenakis, Harrison Birtwistle, and Peter Maxwell Davies as influences.

=== Academia and opera ===
Following his early symphonic successes, MacRae expanded his career into advanced research and higher education. He pursued further academic research at the University of Edinburgh, completing a Doctor of Philosophy (PhD) in musical composition under the supervision of composer Peter Nelson. MacRae subsequently joined the senior faculty at the Royal Conservatoire of Scotland (RCS) in Glasgow, where he serves as a Lecturer in Composition.

Alongside his institutional duties, MacRae established a long-standing creative partnership with the Scottish novelist and librettist Louise Welsh, shifting a significant portion of his creative output toward contemporary opera. In 2012, they co-created Ghost Patrol, a chamber opera co-commissioned by Scottish Opera and Music Theatre Wales. The production received critical acclaim, winning the 2013 South Bank Sky Arts Award for Opera and earning a nomination for the Laurence Olivier Award for Outstanding Achievement in Opera.

MacRae and Welsh continued their theatrical collaborations with The Devil Inside (2016)—a contemporary adaptation of Robert Louis Stevenson's short story "The Bottle Imp", which toured both the UK and North America—and the full-length Arctic expedition thriller Anthropocene (2019), premiered by Scottish Opera. From 2017 to 2022, MacRae served as the Composer in Association for the Lammermuir Festival, culminating in the world premiere of his large-scale Prometheus Symphony (2019). He was also selected as one of the inaugural foundation cohorts for the UK's Music Patron digital patronage initiative, focusing on how contemporary classical works are commissioned and funded.

== List of compositions ==
=== Operas and stage works ===
- The Assassin Tree (2006): chamber opera in three acts, libretto by Simon Armitage; co-commissioned by Edinburgh International Festival and The Royal Opera House (now Royal Ballet and Opera)
- Echo and Narcissus (2006; dance opera) - libretto by Edward Kemp, choreography by Cathy Marston; commissioned by The Royal Opera House (now Royal Ballet and Opera)
- Remembrance Day (2008): short chamber opera in one act, libretto by Louise Welsh; commissioned by Scottish Opera
- Ghost Patrol (2012): chamber opera in one act, libretto by Louise Welsh; co-commissioned by Scottish Opera and Music Theatre Wales
- The Devil Inside (2016) chamber opera in two acts, libretto by Louise Welsh; co-commissioned by Scottish Opera and Music Theatre Wales
- Anthropocene (2019) full-scale opera in three acts, libretto by Louise Welsh; premiered by Scottish Opera.

=== Orchestral and large ensemble ===
- Landscape and the Mind: Distance, Refuge (1997) for orchestra
- Violin Concerto (2001)
- Ancrene Wisse (2002) for choir and orchestra
- Hamartia (2003) for cello and string ensemble
- Birches (2007) for chamber orchestra
- Gaudete (2008) for soprano and orchestra)
- Earth (2010) for orchestra
- Prometheus Symphony (2019) with texts by Aeschylus and Goethe, for soprano, bass-baritone soloists, and orchestra), premiered at the Lammermuir Festival.

=== Chamber and instrumental ===
- The Witch's Kiss (1997) for chamber ensemble
- Motus (2003) for chamber ensemble
- Parable (2013) for baritone and chamber ensemble, text by Wilfred Owen
- Ixion (2014) for chamber ensemble
- Cantata (2016), written for the Choir of Gonville and Caius College, Cambridge
- Piano Sonata No. 2 (2016), dedicated to pianist Simon Smith
- Sunrises (2017) for piano trio, written for the Gould Piano Trio.
- I Am Prometheus (2018) for tenor and chamber ensemble, text by the composer
- Ursa Minor (2020) for chamber ensemble
- The Captive (2022) for mezzo-soprano and chamber ensemble, text by Emily Brontë
- Kingdoms (2022; tenor and piano), text by Chinwe D. John
- Five Stevenson Songs (2024) for tenor and piano, text by Robert Louis Stevenson.

== Awards and nominations ==
- 2013 – Winner, South Bank Sky Arts Award for Opera (for Ghost Patrol)
- 2013 – Shortlisted, Laurence Olivier Award for Outstanding Achievement in Opera (for Ghost Patrol)
- 2020 – Winner, Scottish Awards for New Music for Large Scale New Work (for Anthropocene)
- 2020 – Nominated, Ivors Composer Awards for Chamber Orchestral (for Prometheus Symphony)

== Selected recordings ==
The compositions of Stuart MacRae have been featured on several commercial releases and profile albums:

Year	Album title	Featured works	Label	Catalog number
2001	Invocations: Contemporary Viola Works	The City Inside	Black Box	BBM1058
2004	The Witten In Nomine Broken Consort Book	Tol-Pedn	Kairos	0012442KAI
2005	James MacMillan and Stuart MacRae: Piano Works	Piano Sonata No. 1	Delphian Records	DCD34009
2006	Interact	Interact	London Sinfonietta Label	SINF CD1-2006
2006	MacRae: Violin Concerto	Violin Concerto; Two Scenes from the Death of Count Ugolino; Motus; Stirling Choruses	NMC Recordings	NMC D115
2009	The NMC Songbook	The Lif of this World	NMC Recordings	NMC D150
2022	Ursa Minor: Chamber Music by Stuart MacRae	Ursa Minor; Dark Liquid; Diversion	Delphian Records	DCD34258
2023	'Earth, thy cold is keen'	'The Captive' / 'elided compressed' / 'the ebb' / 'Haroldswick'	Delphian Records	DCD34297
