= University of Plymouth Contemporary Music Festival =

- Genre: Contemporary
- Dates: February, annually.
- Years active: 14
- Founders: University of Plymouth
- Organised by: The Arts Institute
- Website: https://www.plymouth.ac.uk/students-and-family/arts-institute-public-programme

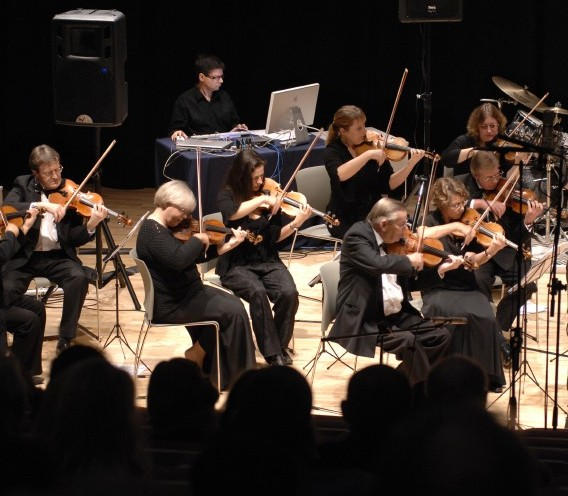
Premiere at the 2008 Festival of Sacra Converzione by Eduardo Reck Miranda

The University of Plymouth Contemporary Music Festival is an annual event held in Plymouth, Devon, England at the University of Plymouth. The event is hosted by The Arts Institute and the University of Plymouth Interdisciplinary Centre for Computer Research.

It has a program of leading-edge orchestral, operatic, jazz, and electroacoustic performances, along with film, and music theatre. Composers and performers who have been part of the festival include BBC Singers, David J. Peterson, Michael Stimpson, Evelyn Glennie, Sally Beamish, liminal, Jem Finer, the Maggini string quartet, Dominic Murcott, Eduardo Reck Miranda, John Matthias, Plaid, Alexis Kirke and Jonty Harrison.

The festival is well known for its unusual ways of creating music. In 2015 a lecturer played a piano duet with a physarum polycephalum slime mould, in 2018 brain waves recorded during seizures were turned into music, and in 2019 sounds sampled from seagulls were performed on a clarinet.

== Events ==
Year	Theme
22–24 February 2019	Multiverse
2–4 March 2018	Decoding Life
24–26 February 2017	Voice 2.0
26–28 February 2016	Frontiers: Expanding Musical Imagination
27 February – 1 March 2015	Biomusic
