= Plymouth Arts Cinema =

Arts centre in Plymouth, England

Coordinates: 50.3695°N 4.1373°W

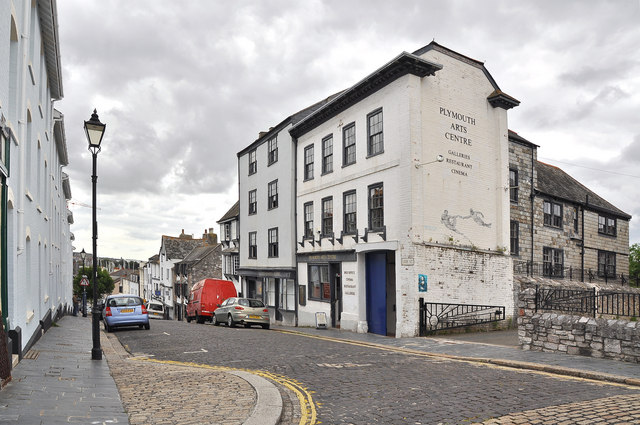
Plymouth Arts Centre

Plymouth Arts Cinema is an independent cinema based at Arts University Plymouth. It screens new independent cinema from all around the world, classic films, along with festivals, special events, and Open Air Cinema.

Plymouth Arts Centre was a centre for contemporary art, independent cinema and creative learning based in the Barbican area of Plymouth, UK. It was first opened in 1947 with funding from the newly formed Arts Council of Great Britain. It was located in a Grade II listed town house in Looe Street, and included space for exhibitions, a cinema, artist studios, a café and a bar. Beryl Cook had her first exhibition here, and many other artists held exhibitions here early in their careers. In 2018, Plymouth Arts Centre closed. The organisation moved to a new location at Plymouth College of Art (renamed Arts University Plymouth in 2022) and continues to exist as an independent cinema, named Plymouth Arts Cinema.

== History ==
Founded in 1947 in a Grade II listed town house in Looe Street, Plymouth Arts Centre was opened by art historian Kenneth Clark. The building is listed as part of a significant group of seventeenth and eighteenth century town houses in the street, many of which are listed. It is a three-storey building that at one time was used as a shop. It has a painted brick front and a steep slate half-hipped roof with deep moulded eaves.

Plymouth Arts Centre was one of seven arts centres set up around the country with funds from the newly established Arts Council of Great Britain. The centre comprises gallery spaces, a 61-seater cinema, artist studios, café and bar space and receives over 70,000 visitors a year.

The artist Beryl Cook had her first exhibition at Plymouth Arts Centre in 1975, and Bernard Samuels, then Director of the Plymouth Arts Centre, is credited with discovering her.

In 2008, to celebrate its diamond jubilee, the centre had a retrospective exhibition, displaying an assortment of old programmes, photographs, posters, invitations and ephemera that had been stored for years in the attics at the centre. The archives have a gap, with a number of years missing between 1957 and the 1970s. The centre staff are hoping that these will turn up in somebody else's attic. Other artists who have held exhibitions in Plymouth Arts Centre include Patrick Heron, Tracey Emin, Allen Ginsberg, Tom Raworth, Peter Greenaway, Ralph Steadman, Vong Phaophanit, Richard Deacon, Andy Goldsworthy and Sir Terry Frost. Many people exhibited here at the start of their careers and went on to become household names.

In 2018, Arts Council England defunded Plymouth Arts Centre and the Looe Street building was sold. The visual arts programme was ended but the cinema moved to a newly built facility at Plymouth College of Art that opened on 10 January 2019.
