= W. Alec Osborn =

British mechanical engineer

W. Alec Osborn, MBE (born 1939) is a British mechanical engineer.

Osborn attended Grantham College, where he apprenticed with British Racing Motors, working on projects including the BRM Formula 1 H16 and V12 engines.

Starting in 1969, he worked at Perkins Engines, from design engineer to chief engineer. He became a consultant in 2002.

He is on the boards of the Deacon's School, and Hereward Community College. He became director of the Thomas Deacon Academy in 2004. Osborn has received an MBE (Member of the British Empire) for his services to education.

In 2002, he was made a Freeman of the City of London, and was made a fellow of the IMechE in 1991. He is on the Dewar Trophy Technical Sub-Committee.

Professional and academic associations
Preceded by Andrew Ives	President of the Institution of Mechanical Engineers; 2006	Succeeded by John Baxter
