= William Edgar (engineer) =

British mechanical engineer

William Edgar CBE (born 1938) is a British mechanical engineer, who was President of the Institution of Mechanical Engineers in 2004.

He is a graduate from Strathclyde University and Birmingham University with an MSc in Thermodynamics and Fluid Mechanics. In 1990, he became Chief Executive of the National Engineering Laboratory.

He gave the George Stephenson Lecture on "The challenges of offshore oil and gas deepwater". He was Director of Seaforth Engineering, which built the Underwater Training Centre at Fort William, Scotland and the National Hyperbaric Centre at Aberdeen. He was a Group Director of the John Wood Group, was Chairman of the J.P. Kenny Group for ten years, and on the board of Subsea UK.

He was appointed CBE in the 2004 New Year Honours.

Professional and academic associations
Preceded by Chris Taylor	President of the Institution of Mechanical Engineers; 2004	Succeeded by Andrew Ives
