= Worshipful Company of Engineers =

Livery company of the City of London

The Worshipful Company of Engineers is one of the livery companies of the City of London. The company was founded and became a livery company in 1983 and was incorporated by royal charter in 2004. The company is for chartered engineers of EC(UK) professional institutions or fellows of the Royal Academy of Engineering. It works to promote and develop all aspects of the science, art, and practice of engineering.

The Engineers' Company ranks ninety-fourth in the order of precedence for livery companies. Its motto is Certare Ingenio, Latin for Use Skills to the Best of One's Abilities. Its church is St Vedast-alias-Foster.

== Masters ==
Since the formation of the Company in 1983:

- 1983 Alderman Sir Peter Gadsden GBE AC FREng
- 1985 Sir Denis Rooke OM CBE FRS FREng
- 1986 Sir William Barlow FREng
- 1987 R B Dunn FREng
- 1988 Rear Admiral Peter G Hammersley CB OBE
- 1989 G A Lee FREng
- 1990 Alderman Sir Francis McWilliams GBE FREng
- 1991 T J C Crocker
- 1992 John V Bartlett CBE FREng
- 1993 G Clerehugh OBE FREng
- 1994 Rear Admiral J S Grove CB OBE
- 1995 L F Turner OBE
- 1996 Sir Frederick Crawford DL FREng
- 1997 J C Smith CBE FREng FRSE
- 1998 D S Mitchell CBE
- 1999 R H Rooley FREng
- 2000 L J Weaver CBE
- 2001 A G Jackson
- 2002 Raymond J R Cousins
- 2003 Sir David Davies CBE FRS FREng
- 2004 Major General E G Willmott CB OBE
- 2005 Dr Robert Hawley CBE FREng FRSE
- 2006 Commander B D Gibson MBE
- 2007 Rear Admiral David K Bawtree CB DL
- 2008 Anthony D Roche FREng
- 2009 F Christopher Price OBE FREng
- 2010 John H Robinson FREng
- 2011 John K Banyard OBE FREng
- 2012 David Scahill
- 2013 Air Vice-Marshal Graham Skinner CBE
- 2014 John Baxter FREng
- 2015 Air Vice-Marshal Patrick J O'Reilly
- 2016 Isobel Pollock-Hulf OBE
- 2017 Richard Groome
- 2018 David M Johnson
- 2019 Commodore Barry Brooks
- 2020 Gordon Masterton OBE DL FREng FRSE
- 2021 Peter Blair-Fish
- 2022 Audrey Canning
- 2023 Raymond Joyce
- 2024 Dr Dolores Byrne OBE
