= Ghost Patrol (opera) =

2012 opera by Stuart MacRae

- Chamber opera by Stuart MacRae
- Librettist: Louise Welsh
- Language: English
- Premiere: 30 August 2012; Traverse Theatre, Edinburgh

Ghost Patrol is a one-act chamber opera composed by Stuart MacRae to an English-language libretto by Louise Welsh. A co-commission by Scottish Opera and Music Theatre Wales, it premiered on 30 August 2012 at the Edinburgh Festival.

== Background ==
Ghost Patrol was co-commissioned by Scottish Opera and Music Theatre Wales for the 50th birthday celebrations of Scottish Opera. It was developed under "Operas Made in Scotland", Scottish Opera's program to encourage new opera writing. The composer, Stuart MacRae, and his librettist, British crime-writer Louise Welsh, had previously collaborated in the program with Remembrance Day, a 15-minute miniature opera created in 2009.

The plot of Ghost Patrol recounts the fall-out after heavy-drinking landlord Alasdair discovers that a homeless thief he has apprehended in his pub is someone he knows, Sam, who had been in the same army platoon as him. Once, they had "colluded in a traumatising atrocity". The opera has a running time of about 58 minutes and is scored for three singers (tenor, baritone, and soprano) accompanied by a small orchestra of 4 woodwind, 2 brass, percussion, harp and strings.

== Performance history and reception ==
Ghost Patrol was premiered on 30 August 2012 at the Traverse Theatre as part of the Edinburgh Festival. It was presented as a double-bill with In the Locked Room by Huw Watkins. The premiere production by Music Theatre Wales was directed by Matthew Richardson and designed by Samal Blak. It then transferred to the Theatre Royal, Glasgow, before touring in England and Wales in the autumn on 2012, including three performances at the Linbury Studio Theatre at the Royal Opera House in London.

Critical opinion admired the dramatic nature of the opera and MacRae's "constantly simmering orchestral style", employing prerecorded tapes and prominent percussion, but some felt that the work is overlong, that the "punchy ideas haven't been smoothly stitched together" and that the libretto "tries to say too much".

In March 2013 the production won the 2013 South Bank Sky Arts Award for Opera. Later the same month the double-bill of this production and that of In the Locked Room was nominated for the 2013 Laurence Olivier Award for Outstanding Achievement in Opera.

== Roles ==
Roles, voice types, premiere cast
Role	Voice type	Premiere cast, 30 August 2012 Conductor: Michael Rafferty
Sam, an ex-army sergeant	tenor	Nicholas Sharratt
Alasdair, an ex-army captain and pub landlord	baritone	James McOran-Campbell
Vicki, an aspiring singer	soprano	Jane Harrington
