= Richard Davies (academic) =

British geologist and academic

Vice-Chancellor of the University of Plymouth
- Incumbent
- Assumed office October 2024
- Preceded by: Judith Petts

Pro-Vice-Chancellor of Global at Newcastle University
- In office 2014 – October 2024
- Succeeded by: Chris Whitehead

Personal details
- Education: University of Reading (BSc), University of Edinburgh (PhD)
- Profession: Geologist
- Website: www.plymouth.ac.uk/staff/richard-davies

Richard Davies is a British geologist, academic and the Vice-Chancellor of the University of Plymouth.

As of 2024, he has published over 100 academic papers, and is an expert on fracking, geology and environmental sciences.

== Education ==
Davies attended Loughborough Grammar School before achieving his BSc in Geology from the University of Reading in 1990, and his PhD in Geology from the University of Edinburgh in 1995.

== Career ==
Davies began his career working at various oil and gas companies, and stopped working in this industry to pursue research into climate change in 2003.

Davies was the director of the Durham Energy Institute at Durham University from 2009–2013.

In 2006, Davies led a team to identify the cause of the Lusi mud volcano eruption, resulting in the oil and gas company paying millions in compensation to the over 50,000 affected local residents. In 2011, he co-authored a paper further investigating the eruption.

Davies became a professor of geo-energy and Pro-Vice-Chancellor of Global at Newcastle University in 2014. Whilst at Newcastle, he continued his work on Fracking research which resulted in heavy criticism against him. Davies was accused of being biased towards fracking companies, a claim which he rejected.

In 2017, Davies received a commendation by the John Maddox Prize.

During the 2020 COVID-19 lockdown, Davies researched the linked between Methane hydrate and the release of methane from the seafloor. The biggest form of mobile carbon on earth, Davies showed that vast quantities of it could be vulnerable to thaw and melt releasing methane into the ocean and potentially the atmosphere.

Davies was appointed the Vice-Chancellor of the University of Plymouth in October 2024 following Judith Petts's retirement. In his first official message to the University, Davies said that he would "put students first" and that he is "optimistic about the future". In May 2025, as his role as vice-chancellor at the university of Plymouth, Davies proposed hundreds of staff cuts and multiple course closures in the school of art design and architecture. Many students have petitioned against this, and the outcome is yet to be finalised.
