= Jacqueline Andrade =

British psychologist

- Title: Professor of psychology

Academic background
- Education: University of Cambridge
- Alma mater: University of Manchester

Academic work
- Discipline: Psychology
- Institutions: University of Plymouth School of Psychology

Jacqueline Andrade, also known as Jackie Andrade, FAcSS (born 20th century) is a British psychologist. She is a professor of psychology in the School of Psychology at the University of Plymouth, located in Plymouth, England. She is a Fellow of the Academy of Social Sciences. Andrade is known for developing a technique called Functional Imagery Training, which aims to use mental imagery to help people crave healthy rather than unhealthy things. She has also led research on accidental awareness during anaesthesia.

== Life ==
Andrade finished BA(hons) Psychology from University of Cambridge in 1987 and then earned a PhD in psychology from the University of Manchester in 1990. She is a professor of psychology in the School of Psychology at the University of Plymouth, located in Plymouth, England. She is a Fellow of the Academy of Social Sciences.

Andrade's research covers craving and behaviour change. Andrade developed a technique called Functional Imagery Training with Jon May, also at the University of Plymouth. The technique uses imagery to subvert the craving pathway, which is normally associated with a desire for unhealthy options, to get people to crave healthy or useful things that help them achieve their goals. A pilot study of the technique, begun in 2020, was used to try to help people with alcohol-related liver disease control their drinking. Andrade has also led research on the harms of accidental awareness during general anaesthesia (AAGA). In 2018, Andrade led research that showed that robot mental health counsellors could create positive experiences for people, especially when discussing sensitive issues.

== See also ==
- List of people from Plymouth
- List of women psychologists
