= John McDougall (mechanical engineer) =

British mechanical engineer

John Donovan McDougall is a British mechanical engineer.

He worked at the Davy Corporation, Whessoe and Sterling Furnaces. In 1975, he joined WS Atkins Consultants, as a project engineer. In 1991, he was promoted to managing director. He is a Director at Darlington Building Society.

He was President of the Institution of Mechanical Engineers in 2002.

Professional and academic associations
Preceded by Tony Roche	President of the Institution of Mechanical Engineers; 2002	Succeeded by Chris Taylor
