= Chris Taylor (engineer) =

Christopher Malcolm Taylor (born 15 January 1943) is an engineer who was the Vice-Chancellor of the University of Bradford, holding the post from 1 October 2001 until 30 April 2007 when he retired.

== Life ==
Taylor was born in Leeds and educated at Leeds Modern School, King's College London (BScEng) and the University of Leeds (MSc, PhD, DEng). He worked as an engineer for The English Electric Company Ltd and then was a Senior Engineering Consultant in an Industrial Unit of Tribology. He started his academic career at the University of Leeds in 1971 and has published over 150 papers.

== Honours ==
Taylor is a Fellow of the Institution of Mechanical Engineers (IMechE), a Chartered Engineer, a Fellow of the Royal Academy of Engineering and a Fellow of The City and Guilds of London Institute. In 2003 Taylor was President of the Institution of Mechanical Engineers.

Taylor's work has been recognised by the award of the Tribology Silver Medal of the IMechE.

Academic offices
Preceded by Colin Bell	Vice-Chancellor of the University of Bradford; 2001–2007	Succeeded by Mark Cleary
Professional and academic associations
Preceded by John McDougall	President of the Institution of Mechanical Engineers; 2003	Succeeded by William Edgar
