= Andrew Ives =

British automotive engineer

- Education: Brunel University

Andrew Ives is a British automotive engineer.

He is a graduate of Brunel University with a First Class Honours in Electrical and Electronic Engineering, and of INSEAD.

He is a Fellow of the Institution of Engineering Technology.

He worked for Lucas Industries for thirty years. He worked with Jaguar Racing. He oversaw the development of engine electronics for the Metro 6R4 super rally car. He was Principal Consultant to Saturn Electronics and Engineering Inc.

Professional and academic associations
Preceded by William Edgar	President of the Institution of Mechanical Engineers; 2005	Succeeded by W. Alec Osborn
