= Mark Cleary (professor) =

British academic (born 1954)

Vice-Chancellor of the University of Plymouth
- In office January 2007 – Late 2007
- Preceded by: Roland Levinsky
- Succeeded by: Steve Newstead

Personal details
- Born: 1954 (age 70–71)
- Occupation: Academic

Mark Cleary (born 1954) was the Vice-Chancellor of the University of Bradford in Yorkshire from 2007 to 2013. He took over in 2007 after the previous vice-chancellor, Chris Taylor, retired after 5 years in the position.

== Early life ==
Born in Birmingham, Cleary earned his Ph.D. in geography from Jesus College, Cambridge.

== Career ==
In 1980, Cleary took a lecturing post at the University of Exeter. In 1989, he became Senior Lecturer at the University of Brunei Darussalam. After spending 1992 at the University of Waikato, New Zealand, Cleary was appointed Senior Lecturer in Geography at the University of Plymouth in 1994, being promoted to Reader in Human Geography in 1995 and Professor of Human Geography four years later. In 2003, he was appointed Dean of the Faculty of Social Sciences and Business at the University of Plymouth and assumed his Deputy Vice-Chancellor role there in 2004.

After the Vice Chancellor of Plymouth was killed in a freak weather accident in January 2007, Cleary was appointed Acting Vice Chancellor, a post he held until he became Vice Chancellor at the University of Bradford.

As Vice Chancellor of Bradford University, Cleary announced his intentions to dock the pay of academics who take part in sanctions.

Brian Cantor replaced him on 1 October 2013.

Academic offices
Preceded by Chris Taylor	Vice-Chancellor of the University of Bradford; 2007–2013	Succeeded by Brian Cantor
