= Grantham College =

College in Grantham, Lincolnshire, England

Location
- Stonebridge Road; Grantham, Lincolnshire, NG31 9AP; England; 52°54′46″N 0°38′05″W

Information
- Type: Further education college
- Established: 1948
- Local authority: East Midlands LSC (although in Lincolnshire)
- Department for Education URN: 130759 Tables
- Ofsted: Reports
- Chair: Mike Argyle
- Principal: Paul Deane
- Gender: Co-educational
- Age: 16+
- Website: http://www.grantham.ac.uk

Grantham College is a further education and Sixth Form college in Grantham, Lincolnshire, England.

== History ==
Elsham House built in the 1860s, by William Hornsby (born 25 December 1838), the third son of Richard Hornsby; previously he had lived on Welby Terrace. The house often had events and promenade concerts in the summer for local organisations, or charitable causes linked to the Wesleyan church. At the time, his brother James owned Stapleford Park (his eldest brother Richard had died in 1877). In 1898 he was the High Sheriff of Lincolnshire. William died at 5am on Tuesday 10 December 1907, aged 69, at his other residence in northern Lincolnshire. William was buried thirty years, to the day, after his brother Richard. William's wife lived at Elsham House until her death on Friday 2 March 1917. The nine-bedroom house was planned to be sold by auction on Monday 25 June 1917, at Elmer House, but on the day of the auction, the property was requisitioned by the military to house camp cooks and waitresses. It became an Officers Mess of the Machine Gun Corps from Harrowby Camp. The house was auctioned on Saturday 14 June 1919. During the early 1920s, when owned by James William Hornsby, the house held charitable events, such as American Tea, for the NSPCC, the Kesteven WI, and Grantham Girl Guides.

On Tuesday 14 August 1923 the site was auctioned, when it was bought by the Longmore family. At this time Arthur Longmore was an Air Commodore. In December 1929 Arthur Longmore became Commandant of Royal Air Force College Cranwell until 1933, and by 1934 he was an Air Vice-Marshal, and an Air Marshal by 1935. His daughter Janet married at St Peter's Church, Eaton Square on Wednesday 12 June 1935; in 1948 Janet's husband became High Sheriff of Lincolnshire, and her son Tony in 1990. On Tuesday 9 July 1935 Arthur was knighted at Buckingham Palace, having received the honour in the 1935 Birthday Honours. Later in 1935 Air Commodore Charles Breese, and his wife, resided at the property, when head of No. 23 Group RAF in Grantham. In November 1939 Arthur was promoted to Air Chief Marshal. Arthur often went foxhunting with the nearby Belvoir Hunt. From July 1940, Lady Longmore was district commissioner of the Girl Guides; many district Girl Guide events took place at the property, notably throughout the war; on Friday 2 June 1944, the Chief Guide Olave Baden-Powell attended one of these Guiding events. His son William was married by John Jagoe, RAF Chaplain-in-Chief from 1944 to 1949, in April 1941 at St Mark's, Mayfair. In March 1942 Arthur stood as the Conservative candidate in the 1942 Grantham by-election. Sqn Ldr George Worth MBE (husband of Janet) stood as the Conservative candidate in the 1945 Grantham election.

=== Construction ===
Elsham House was sold by auction on Wednesday 17 October 1945 for £5,334 to Grantham Technical College, and it was hoped to open the college by September 1947, but it would be open by at least 1948. The house, and squash court, were converted to classrooms in 1948 for £8,500. It was opened on 20 September 1948 by Kesteven County Council In 1949 £33,000 was spent on new workshops for engineering and gas fitting and classrooms.

The first part of the new college, the engineering workshops, was opened on Friday 14 September 1951 by Lt-Gen Sir Ronald Weeks (one of his grandsons is the Dorset Conservative MP Richard Drax). Also at the opening was Sir Robert Pattinson, the Chairman of Kesteven County Council, and the Chairman of the Governors, Mr Fitzherbert Wright, from Belton; Mr Wright was the former Works Director (until 1949) of Aveling-Barford, and one of daughters, Susan Mary Wright, would be the mother of Sarah Ferguson. The college was mostly intended to train craft apprentices for the local building industry. Fitzherbert Wright was also the chairman of Kesteven Education Committee.

Main building began in November 1952, and it became Grantham College for Further Education. The building was officially opened on Tuesday 8 September 1959 by the conservationist Sir Peter Scott. Building had cost £252,031 and equipment had cost £52,377.

=== Events ===
In November 1954, at the annual prize evening at the Grantham Barracks, aeronautical engineer Sir Frederick Handley Page, gave out the prizes. Sir Frederick said 'The danger of these modern times is the slow extermination of the individual, and I fear that the time may approach when men and women my become mere units and numbers'.

On Wednesday 1 November 1967 the Vice-Chancellor of the University of Nottingham, Frederick Dainton, Baron Dainton, gave out the prizes.

When run by Kesteven Council, many evening events would take place at the college, in the 1960s; Sleaford did not have such a college. But once Lincolnshire County Council took over, in 1974, the college became much more peripheral, and any event that was operated under the leadership of the county council would take place in Lincoln instead.

The Kesteven Drama Festival had the final at the college in April 1961.

=== Teaching ===
The pre-nursing course was approved by the General Nursing Council in July 1960, and the Ministry of Education.

Qualifications in book-keeping were provided by the East Midland Educational Union. Much construction training was through day release. Construction courses led to the National Certificate of Building Construction. Language courses were set by the Institute of Linguists. Carpentry exams were set by the British Institute of Certified Carpenters. Construction exams were set by the National Joint Council for the Building Industry

In 1958 the Ministry of Power set up a committee to look at examinations for the iron ore industry. Day release courses were taught at the college and at Scunthorpe, Melton and Kettering. The C&G courses were the Iron Ore Operatives course, and the Iron Ore Quarrying Certificate. From September 1960 it was the first, and only, in the country to offer a block release course in the Iron Ore Quarrying Advanced Certificate, supported by the National Council of Associated Iron Ore Producers, and National Joint Board for the Iron Ore Industry. There was not a wide enough interest in that type of course across England. It was a three-year course, mostly for people who had attended a grammar school.

In February 1962 it was the first in the country to have a block release for the Sand, Gravel and Quarrying Certificate, a C&G course. It would be one week in four, over two years, supported by the Institute of Quarrying and Sand and Gravel Association of Great Britain. People came from Scotland, Nottinghamshire, Kent and Somerset, staying in hotel accommodation for the four days. In 1961 a Somerset company had sent a letter to the college enquiring about a similar course to the iron ore quarrying, but in sand and gravel.

But, in August 1969, a proposed £130m steel plant at Scunthorpe Steelworks, by the British Steel Corporation, would mean the closure of the iron ore quarries at Exton Park and Sproxton Quarry around 1973, as the Northampton Sand Formation was not good enough. There were around three hundred people working in these mines. A new iron ore terminal would be built at Immingham Dock, the Immingham Bulk Terminal, to take steel production at Scunthorpe from 3,100,000 tons to 5,400,000 tons, known as the 'Anchor project'.

From September 1961, it was decided to have only two training centres for gas fitting in Lincolnshire. One would be at Grantham, and the other at Grimsby FE College. From September 1968, the East Midlands Gas Board had requested that training be given as block-release, not day-release.

A licensed trades catering course was introduced in September 1961. The course was the National Trade Development Association's Innkeepers Catering Diploma. The NTDA became part of the Brewers' Society in December 1975.

From September 1963 it introduced a course for people in solicitors offices, legal assistants, who were not supported by the Institute of Legal Executives.

From September 1964 Kesteven Council decided to experiment with combining secondary education at the college, for one year. All 15-16 year olds at the William Robertson School in Welbourn would have one day a week at the college being taught commerce. College teachers would also visit the school.

In 1967 Rutland had 157 at FE college; of these, 75 were at Grantham College, and 51 at Melton College.

=== Principals ===
- January 1948 George Frederick Johnson, left August 1971, awarded the OBE in the 1972 Birthday Honours, originally from Sunderland, he lived at Great Gonerby.
- September 1971 David Malcolm Lyon, the former head of commerce at Carlton College of FE, Nottinghamshire, he lived at Great Gonerby. He became the Principal of Chesterfield College in 1979. He saw full time numbers rise from 250 to 547.
- 1979 Terry Keith Jones, he lived in Barrowby

=== Sport ===
Grantham Squash Club met at the college's two courts, until the club built their own site in 1970, after receiving a Sports Council grant.

=== Education across Grantham ===
In the early 1970s there were advanced proposals by Kesteven County Council (based in Sleaford) to abolish the eleven-plus selection system in the Grantham area and use Grantham College as the only sixth form in the town. Mary Large, the Chairman of the Kesteven Education Committee, said that more young people preferred to go to college rather than stay in a school sixth form because of the 'more adult atmosphere'. In 1973 the Education Secretary, Margaret Thatcher, had to approve the plan, which involved converting her former school, Kesteven and Grantham Girls' School, into a mixed comprehensive. It was not approved.

In April 1974 control of the college passed from Kesteven to Lincolnshire County Council in Lincoln. Later, in 1979, it became Grantham College of Further Education. In the early 1990s control passed to the Further Education Funding Council for England, then to the East Midlands Learning and Skills Council based at Leicester. Also in the early 1990s the college name was shortened to Grantham College, and became an Associate College of Nottingham Trent University. It is now an Associate College of the University of Bedfordshire, and Bishop Grosseteste University College, and through these it offers HND, HNC, and Foundation degree courses.

The college was never officially a fully developed sixth form college, although used for that purpose; in 2008 a purpose-built sixth form college opened in Grantham at the Walton Girls High School.

From September 2010 the college provided for equestrian courses at The Paddocks Equestrian Centre at Hough-on-the-Hill, a village to the north of Grantham.

=== Visits ===
- Minister of Education Florence Horsbrugh (the first female Conservative cabinet minister) visited Grantham on Friday 31 October 1952, and arrived at the college at 10.30am on the Saturday morning, to lay a foundation stone, and she visited the college for five hours. Also attending was Sir Robert Pattinson, and the Bishop of Grantham, who delivered an episcopal blessing before the ceremony.
- On the evening of 29 November 1963, the Prime Minister Alec Douglas-Home, gave a talk at the college.

== Structure ==
Grantham College's Elsham House building was built by Richard Hornsby & Sons in the 1860s. The college has 77 residential places in Sedgwick Hall and Sedgwick Mews halls of residence. A satellite to Grantham College is Sleaford College, in the nearby town of Sleaford.

The former Girls Central School became an annexe of the college, known as the Teachers Centre Annexe.

In January 1967 a 40 ft radio mast was put on the top of the college, for police radio transmissions.

A pottery studio was built in Elsham House from September 1968, to form part of an art centre.

It acquired a sports field in October 1969.

On Monday 19 September 1994 it opened its first residential block called Sedgwick Hall, for 49. It cost £650,000. The college was now separate from the county council. It could never have built this building when under the county council.

It was given a drinks licence in September 1995.

Grantham College is accessed via the A1 and East Coast Main Line, and the A52 from the east. However, most college usage is by those who live in close proximity. Similar education is available further north from Grantham, at Lincoln College's sites in Lincoln and Newark-on-Trent, and 25 miles (40 km) to east at Boston College in Boston. The other nearby Lincolnshire towns of Spalding and Bourne do not have FE colleges.

=== Sleaford ===
The Sleaford Evening Institute began with evening classes at the Sleaford Secondary Modern School on Church Lane, and classes would be taught also at Grantham Technical College, for some of those attending the evening institute. There were also evening institutes in Claypole, Heckington, Bourne, Billinghay and North Hykeham, at the relevant local schools, run by Kesteven Council. Sleaford College was launched in 1999 on Eastgate by Grantham and Boston colleges.

== Notable alumni ==
- Beverley Allitt - Serial killer nurse.
- W. Alec Osborn MBE – president from 2006 to 2007 of the Institution of Mechanical Engineers, and former Chief Engineer of Perkins Engines
- Abi Titmuss, acquired a Grade D in Science in society AS-level, in August 1995

== See also ==
- New College Stamford - the other FE college in South Kesteven
