= The Arts Institute =

- Headquarters: Roland Levinsky Building, University of Plymouth.
- Director: Rupert Lorraine
- Musical Director: Robert Taub
- Parent organization: University of Plymouth
- Formerly called: Peninsula Arts

The Arts Institute (formerly Peninsula Arts) operates from within the Faculty of Arts and serves as the Arts and Culture programming umbrella organisation for the University of Plymouth. The year round public programme includes exhibitions, music, film, talks and performing arts.

Its aim is to provide a prestigious and wide-ranging series of events which open up the arts and university to the people of Plymouth, the South West and visitors to the region.

The University of Plymouth Contemporary Music Festival is an annual event hosted with the University of Plymouth Interdisciplinary Centre for Computer Research, and occurs in February.

== Venues and locations ==
The Levinsky Gallery is the main hub for The Arts Institute, and the largest contemporary art gallery in the south west of England. It is located inside the Roland Levinsky Building at the university. Admission is free but may be restricted during events.

The House is another building at the university located behind the Roland Levinsky Building, which is used for theatre and dance performances, and the Jill Graigie Cinema which is used for showing films and lectures at the university.

== Notable performances ==
- Rosemary Johnson, a disabled violinist played music using an EEG cap.
- In 2015 a slime mould and a lecturer played a piano duet based on the mould's movements.
- In 2018, brainwaves recorded during seizures were turned into music.
