= Babbage Building =

Building at the University of Plymouth, England

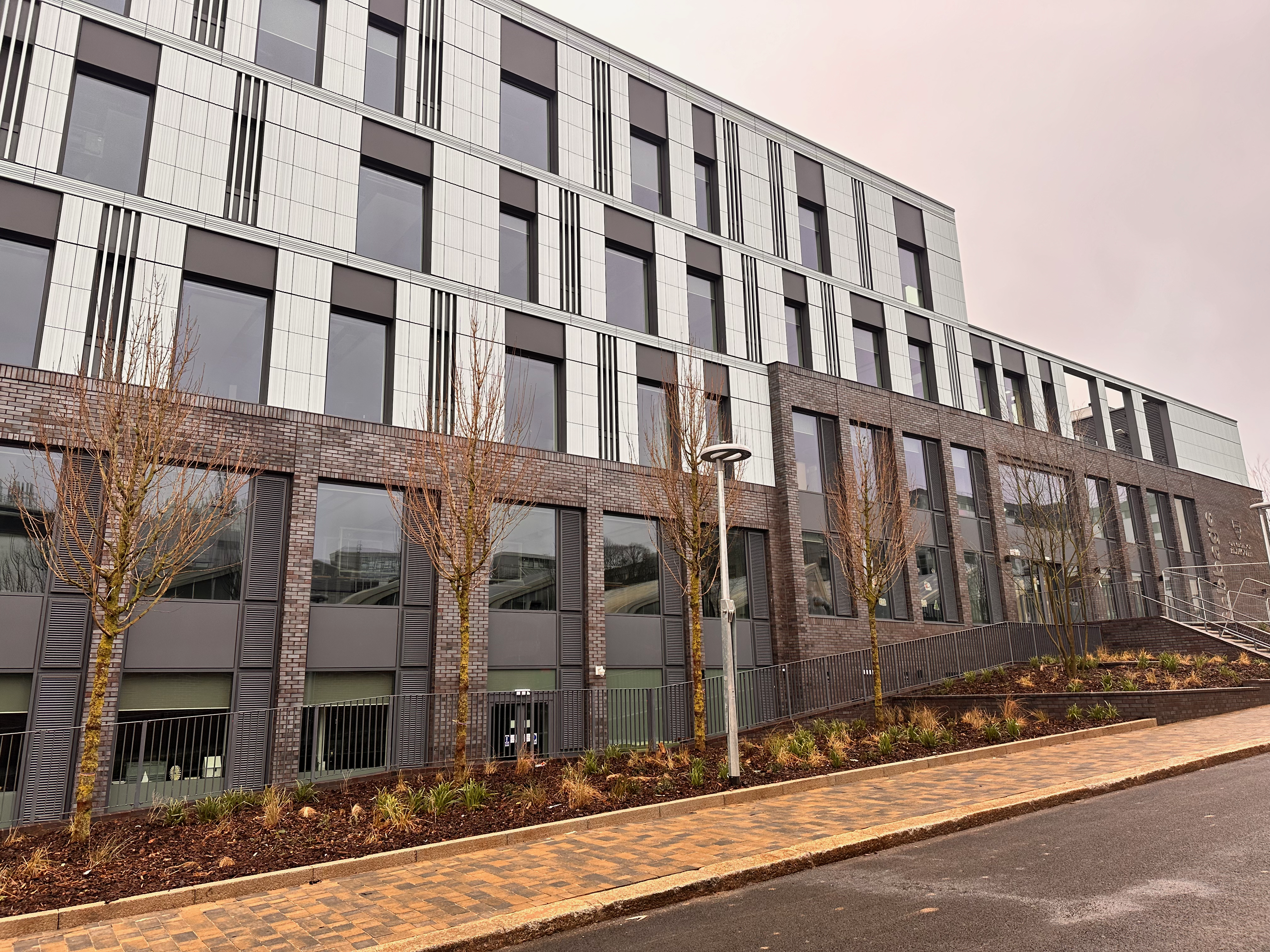
- Babbage Building on 16 December 2023

General information
- Type: Education
- Coordinates: 50.3754°N 4.1408°W
- Completed: 1979
- Renovated: 2021-2023
- Renovation cost: £30 million
- Owner: University of Plymouth

Renovating team
- Architect(s): Feilden Clegg Bradley Studios
- Main contractor: BAM

The Babbage Building is a teaching building at the University of Plymouth for the university's School of Engineering, Computing and Mathematics and the School of Art, Design and Architecture.

== Background ==
The Babbage Building, also known as the New Engineering and Design Facility, is a teaching building named after Charles Babbage, a mathematician, philosopher, inventor and mechanical engineer who originated the concept of a digital programmable computer.

After renovations in 2021–2023, the building contains a number of fabrication and computing laboratories.

== History ==
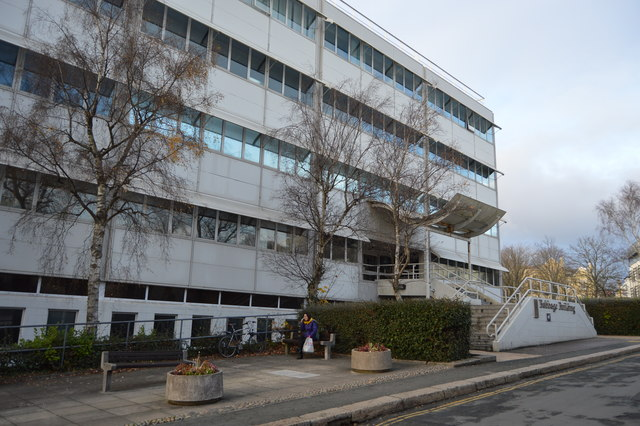
The original Babbage Building.

=== 1979-2019: Original building ===
The Babbage Building was originally constructed in 1979 as an engineering facility for the University of Plymouth. Prior to being named the Babbage Building, it was called the General Teaching Block (abbreviated to GTB).

=== 2019-2023: Renovation ===
In 2019, a design competition was held for a renovation of the Babbage Building.

Planning permission was granted for the works in December 2020. The main contractor for the renovations is BAM, and the new building was designed by Feilden Clegg Bradley Studios.

In 2021, the building was closed for renovations costing £63 million. For the renovations to be able to take place, the university had to temporarily relocate classes and infrastructure to other places across the campus. The university's data center was mostly moved to the cloud as a result of the works.

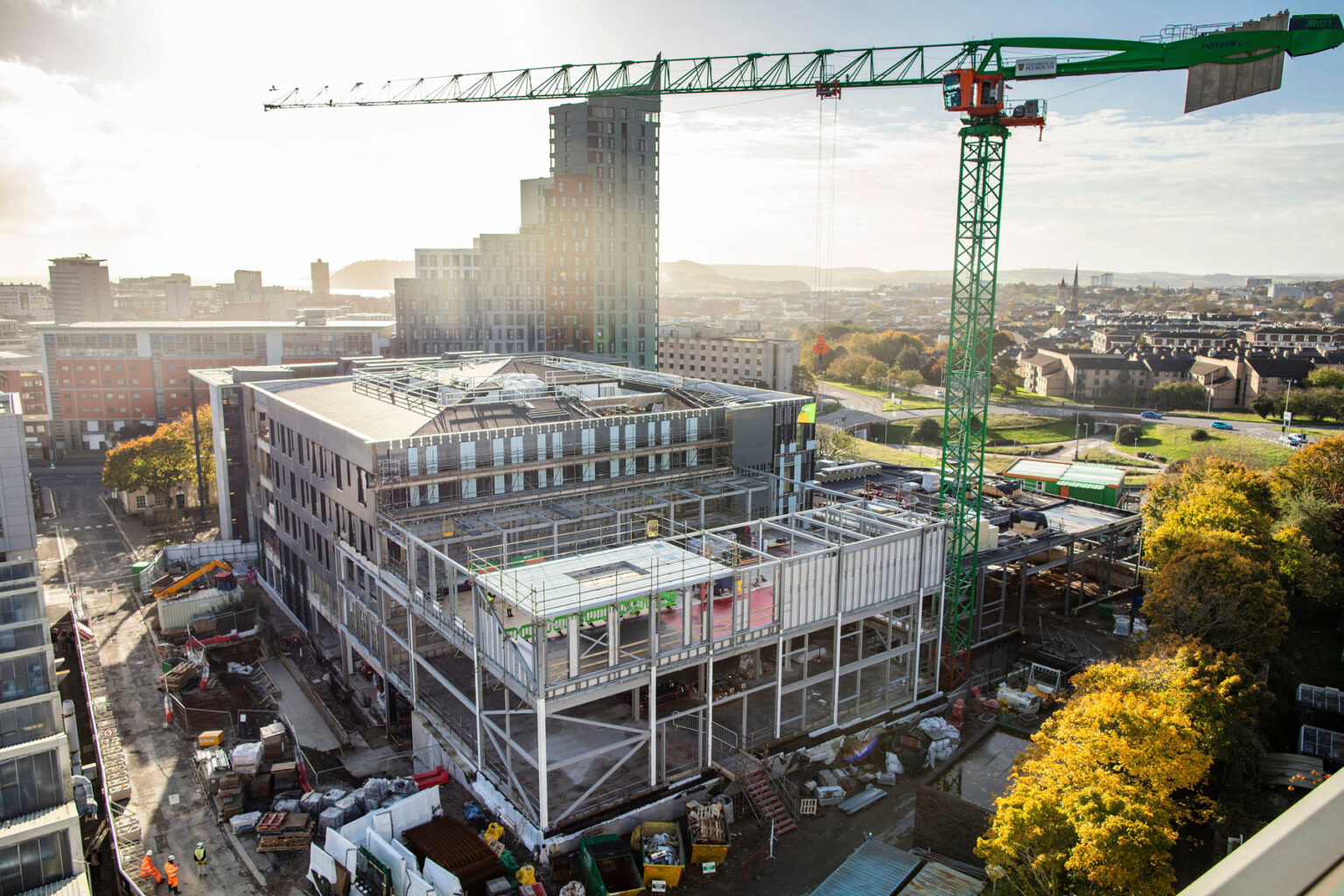
Babbage building during renovations in 2022.

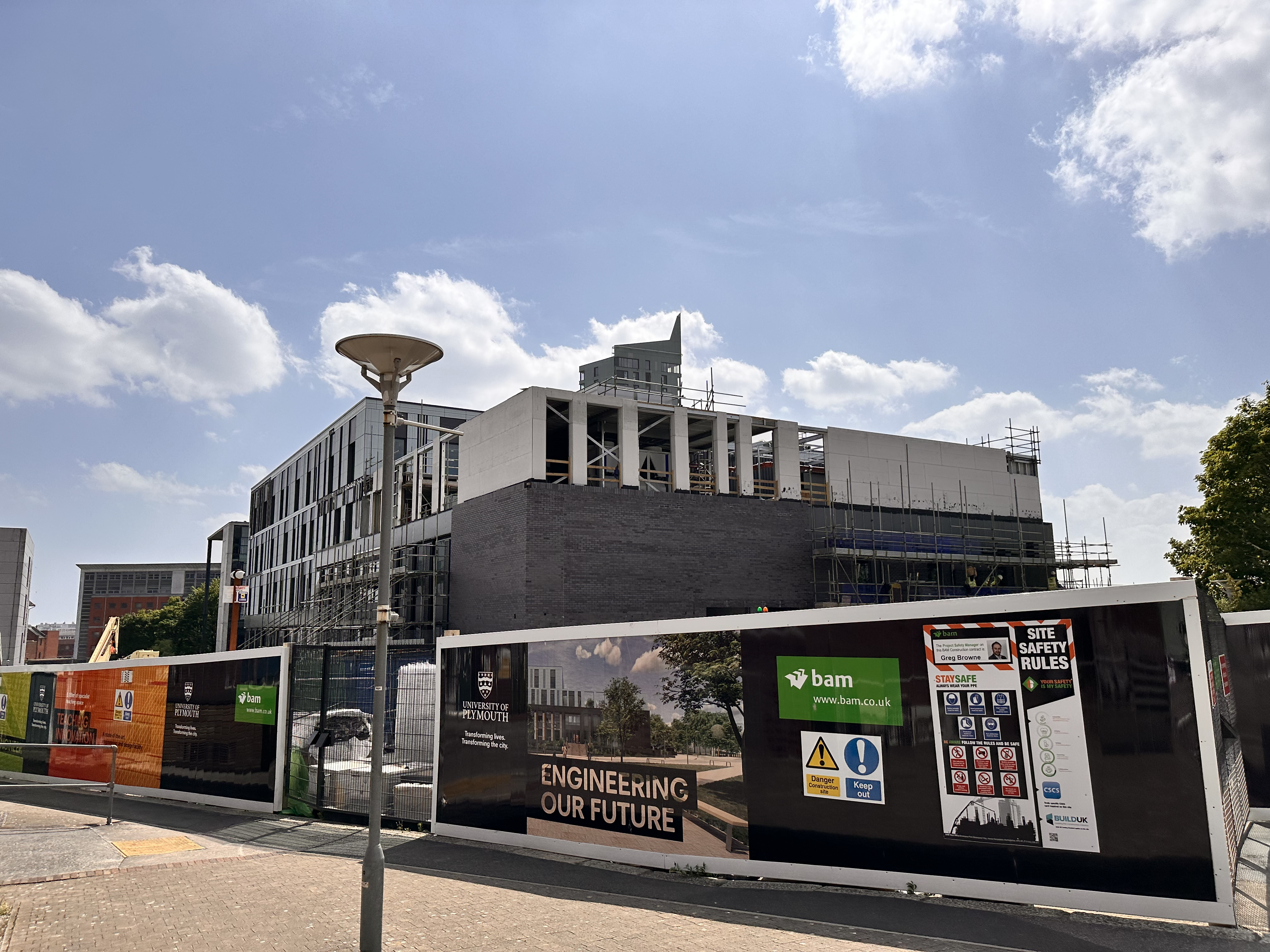
Babbage Building during renovations in 2023.

The building was completely emptied, internal walls taken down, and the outer walls taken off, with only the concrete structure remaining. The renovated building has larger windows, blue cladding, and a rooftop garden. The original structure was also expanded towards the rear and right side of the building.

The newly renovated building contains 108,000 square feet (10,000 m^{2}) of teaching and learning space, and is focused on using low carbon technologies to reduce the university's carbon footprint.

The building was due to reopen in September 2023, but was delayed and officially opened on Saturday 18 November 2023.

Some time after the works, the university has stated that the nearby Brunel building will be demolished and turned into a park when all of its functions have been moved into the Babbage building.
