= Roland Levinsky =

Vice-Chancellor of the University of Plymouth
- In office September 2002 – 1 January 2007
- Preceded by: John Bull
- Succeeded by: Mark Cleary

Personal details
- Born: 16 October 1943 Bloemfontein, South Africa
- Died: 1 January 2007 (aged 63) Wembury, England

Professor Roland Levinsky (16 October 1943 – 1 January 2007) was an academic researcher in biomedicine and a university senior manager. His last post, which he held at the time of his death, was as vice-chancellor of the University of Plymouth in the United Kingdom.

== Personal life ==
Levinsky was born on 16 October 1943 in Bloemfontein, South Africa, to Jewish parents. His father emigrated from the Lithuania/Poland area to South Africa to escape persecution; many of his relatives died in Nazi-German death camps. Levinsky noted that "Father was a communist and we had our fair share of police raids."

== Career ==
Levinsky's initial specialisation was as a paediatrician, and he became a world leader in research on immunodeficiency diseases. He worked for several years at Great Ormond Street Hospital in London where he performed Britain's first successful bone marrow transplant. Subsequently, from 1990, he served as dean and director of research at the Institute of Child Health of University College, London, and from 1999 until he moved to Plymouth. In 1998, he was an inaugural Fellow of the Academy of Medical Sciences.

=== University of Plymouth ===
He was appointed as Vice-Provost for Biomedicine and Head of the Graduate School of the college. He had over 250 scientific publications to his credit.

On his appointment as the University of Plymouth's second vice-chancellor in September 2002, Levinsky set himself to lift the university from its then position as one of the leading post-1992 universities to rival much older and more research-intensive institutions. To do so, he was willing to take unpopular decisions, such as the concentration of the university's teaching (outside the health arena) in Plymouth itself, with the closure of its campuses in Exeter, Newton Abbot (the former Seale-Hayne Agricultural College), and Exmouth (the former Rolle College of Education, moved to Plymouth in 2008).

These moves undoubtedly gave Plymouth more the structure of the longer-established UK universities, and its position in the education media's league tables rose sharply in his period of office.

== Death ==
Levinsky was killed on 1 January 2007 in an accident while out walking in stormy weather with his wife, on New Year's Day 2007. High winds blew down overhead power cables in a field near his house in Wembury, and a live cable touched him, causing his electrocution.

The new Arts building, opened in September 2007 was named The Roland Levinsky Building in his honour. A memorial fund was also established in his name.
