= Judith Petts =

British academic

Dame Judith Irene Petts BA CBE DBE
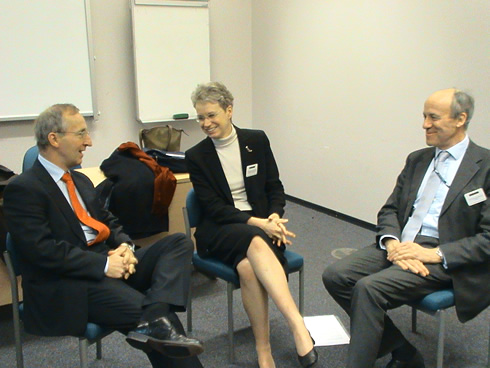
- Judith Petts (centre) in December 2007

Vice-Chancellor of the University of Plymouth
- In office February 2016 – October 2024
- Preceded by: Wendy Purcell
- Succeeded by: Richard Davies

Personal details
- Born: January 7, 1954 (age 72)
- Occupation: Academic
- Website: www.plymouth.ac.uk/staff/judith-petts

Dame Judith Irene Petts DBE (born 7 January 1954) is a British academic and the former Vice-Chancellor of the University of Plymouth.

== Academic career ==
She graduated from the University of Exeter with a BA in geography in 1975. She was a research fellow in the Institute for Planning Studies, University of Nottingham and then joined Loughborough University where she completed her PhD in 1996 and became Director of the Centre for Hazard and Risk Management.

In 1998, she became Professor of Environmental Risk Management and later Head of the School of Geography, Earth and Environmental Sciences at the University of Birmingham, serving as Pro-Vice-Chancellor 2007–2010. In 2010, she joined the University of Southampton as the Dean of the Faculty of Social and Human Sciences and Pro-Vice-Chancellor for Research and Enterprise.

In February 2016, she was appointed the University of Plymouth's Vice-Chancellor and Chief Executive, she remained in these roles until her retirement in 2024.

== Appointments and honours ==
Professor Petts served as a member of the Council of NERC 2000–2006 and the NERC Innovation Board 2014–2018. She is an associate of the Centre for Science and Policy at the University of Cambridge. She was a Government advisor as a member of the Royal Commission on Environmental Pollution (2006–2011) and the Science Advisory Council of Defra (2011–2016). In 2012, she was awarded a CBE for services to scientific research, and in 2024 was made a DBE in the King's Birthday Honours.

== Personal life ==
She was married to Professor Geoffrey Petts (d. August 2018).
