= John Baxter (engineer) =

British nuclear engineer

- Born: 1951 (age 74–75)
- Education: Strathclyde University
- Occupation: Group Engineering Director
- Employer: BP

John Baxter, CBE, FREng, FRSE (born 1951) is a British nuclear engineer, and currently the Group Engineering Director at BP.

== Education ==
Baxter was educated at Strathclyde University, reading mechanical engineering. He studied for a postgraduate degree at the Royal Naval College, Greenwich, then trained as a Royal Navy Submarine Officer.

== Career ==
Baxter was a Submarine Engineer Officer, and served on a Polaris nuclear submarine carrying out refitting. His subsequent career with the United Kingdom Atomic Energy Authority included running the Dounreay and Windscale nuclear sites, and forming Hunting BRAE plc which ran the UK Atomic Weapon plants. In 1996 he was appointed to the UKAEA Board by the Secretary of State for Trade and Industry.

Prior to BP he was the Group Engineering Director of the UK electricity utility Powergen plc.

Baxter is a Fellow of the Royal Academy of Engineering and a Fellow of The Royal Society of Edinburgh. He is also a Fellow of a number of engineering institutions and was the President of both the Institution of Mechanical Engineers and The Welding Institute. He is the Master of the Worshipful Company of Engineers and a Court Assistant of the Worshipful Company of Tallow Chandlers.

He has been awarded honorary doctorates from Robert Gordon University in 2008 and Strathclyde University in 2011.

He advises the UK Ministry of Defence on oil industry matters and holds the rank of Colonel in the Engineer and Logistic Staff Corps of the Royal Engineers.

From 2000 to 2013 he was a member of the Defence Nuclear Safety Committee advising the Secretary of State on the safety of the UK nuclear weapon and nuclear submarine programmes.

He is a Fellow of the Institution of Mechanical Engineers and the Institution of Engineering and Technology and the Royal Academy of Engineering and a Liveryman of the Worshipful Company of Engineers.

He advises the MoD on the oil industry concerns.

Baxter was appointed Commander of the Order of the British Empire (CBE) in the 2016 New Year Honours for services to engineering, education, and the energy sector.

Professional and academic associations
Preceded by W. Alec Osborn	President of the Institution of Mechanical Engineers; 2007	Succeeded by William M. Banks
