= Lola Perrin =

American-British composer and pianist

Lola Perrin is a minimalist composer and pianist with jazz influences. She is American (with roots in the Ukraine and Hungary) and lives in London. She is the sister of jazz and world music composer and pianist Roland Perrin. Lola says she takes her inspiration from artists such as Edward Hopper, Ansel Adams, Rachel Whiteread, Carsten Hoeller and the Irish author Christopher Nolan. Her debut album is titled Fragile Light.

Not so recent performances include playing live at the First International Conference of Minimalist Music in Bangor, UK. Piano Suite VI: Theory of K was premiered at Music, Science and The Brain, an academic symposium in Plymouth, UK in September 2008. In April 2009 Lola premiered a new commission for the London Design Museum - Suite VII for Piano & Correspondent. This was performed live with the BBC Correspondent Mihir Bose live in the museum.

Current projects include an opera Hanif Kureishi's The Flies. Lola regularly collaborates with composers and artists such as Thomas Gray, John Kennedy, Alexis Kirke, and Roland Perrin. She also teaches piano, with one of her students being Ed Balls, Britain's Shadow Chancellor of the Exchequer.
