= Edward Kemp =

Edward Kemp may refer to:

- Sir Edward Kemp (Albert Edward Kemp, 1858–1929), Canadian politician
- Edward Kemp (horticulturist) (1910–2012), Scottish horticulturist
- Edward Kemp (landscape architect) (1817–1891), English landscape architect
- Edward Kemp (playwright) (born 1965), English playwright and theatre director, Director of RADA
- Ducky Kemp (Edward J. Kemp), 1920s American baseball outfielder in the Negro leagues
