= Eduardo Reck Miranda =

Brazilian music composer and scientist (born 1963)

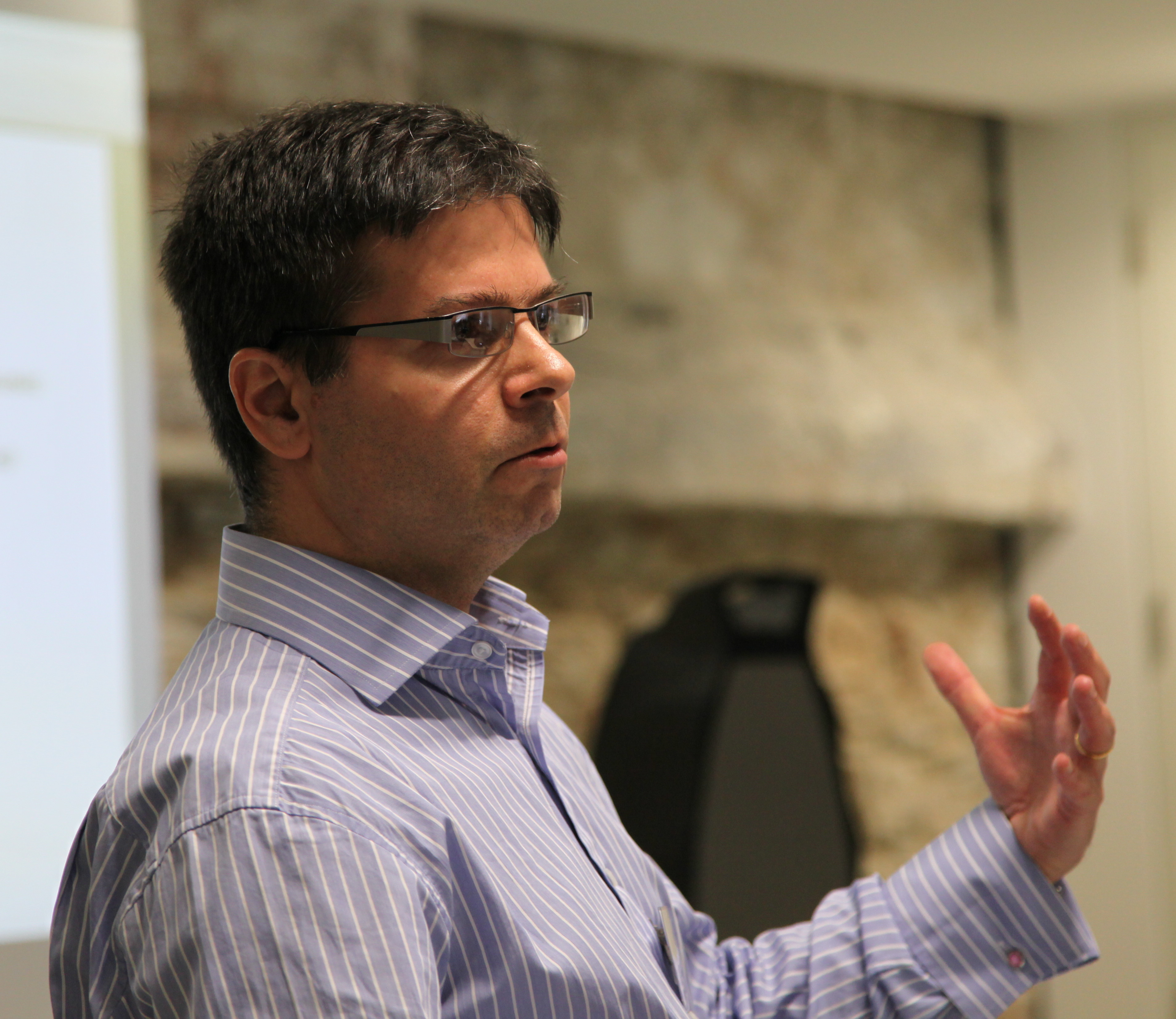
- Miranda in 2011

Background information
- Born: 1963 (age 62–63); Porto Alegre, Brazil
- Genres: Chamber, electroacoustic
- Occupations: Composer, academic
- Website: neuromusic.soc.plymouth.ac.uk
- Scientific career
- Education: University of Edinburgh (PhD); University of York (MSc)
- Doctoral advisor: Peter Nelson

Eduardo Reck Miranda is a Brazilian-born computer scientist and composer, known for his research into music with artificial intelligence, brain–computer interfaces, and unconventional computing. He has played a leading role in the development of brain–computer music interfacing (BCMI) and is regarded as a pioneer of quantum computer music, a concept he introduced for research exploring applications of quantum computing in musical composition and performance.

== Early life and education ==
Miranda was born in Porto Alegre, Brazil.

In the early 1990s, Miranda attended the University of Vale do Rio dos Sinos (UNISINOS) in Brazil where he received a degree in Data Processing Technology in 1985. Miranda then attended the Federal University of Rio Grande do Sul (UFRGS) where he studied music composition. In 1991, he received his MSc in Music Technology from York.

In 1992, Miranda gained admittance to the Faculty of Music of the University of Edinburgh in Scotland where he obtained his PhD under the superision of Peter Nelson in the combined fields of music and artificial intelligence in 1995.

== Career ==
Miranda worked as a data analyst at Racimec.

After receiving his PhD, Miranda worked at the Edinburgh Parallel Computing Centre (EPCC). At EPCC, he developed Chaosynth, an innovative granular synthesis software that uses cellular automata to generate complex sound spectra.

In the mid-1990s, Miranda joined the Department of Music at the University of Glasgow, where he lectured in music technology and electroacoustic music composition. He then moved to Paris to take up a research position at Sony Computer Science Laboratory.

While at Sony, Miranda filed patents in the field of speech processing and made scientific contributions in the fields of speech synthesis, evolutionary music (computational) and cognitive neural modeling.

In the early 2000s, Miranda was appointed adjunct associate professor of computer science at the American University of Paris.

In the mid-2000s, Miranda moved to the University of Plymouth in the United Kingdom, where he is a full professor of computer music and head of the Interdisciplinary Centre for Computer Music Research (ICCMR).

== Research ==
Miranda is credited with creating the field of brain–computer music interfacing (BCMI), a term he coined to describe systems that use brain signals, typically from electroencephalography (EEG), to actively generate or influence music in real time.

His work includes the development of the Paramusical Ensemble, which enabled a group of individuals with neuromotor disabilities to make music together thanks to a bespoke BCMI system developed with his team at the University of Plymouth.

Beginning around 2017, Miranda began exploring the application of quantum computing to music. His work in this area includes developing algorithms for music generation, such as partitioned quantum cellular automata (PQCA), machine learning (Quantum Reservoir Computing) and designing live performance systems where musicians interact with cloud-based quantum computers.

In 2024, he released Qubism, an album of music composed and performed with quantum computers which is cited as the first album composed entirely using quantum computing.

== Musical compositions ==
Miranda's compositions have been performed and broadcast internationally. He has been featured at several music festivals, such as the Festival Latino-Americano de Arte e Cultura (Brasília, 1987), the International Symposium for Electronic Arts (Minneapolis, 1993), Bienal de Música Brasileira Contemporânea (Rio de Janeiro, 1995) and Synthèse Festival (Bouges, 1995, 1999, 2001), Festival Música Viva (Lisbon, 2000), Ultraschall (Berlin, 2007), Electronica III - BBC Concert Orchestra (London, 2011), EarZoom Festival (Ljubljana, 2011), Mainly Mozart (La Jolla, 2015), BEYOND Festival (Karlsruhe, 2018), MVMF Metaverse Music Fest (2022), CTM Festival (Berlin, 2024) and AlUIa Future Culture Summit (AlUla, 2024). His works have also been performed by ensembles such as Orquestra Sinfônica de Port Alegre (OSPA), Scottish Chamber Orchestra, BBC Singers, BBC Concert Orchestra, and London Sinfonietta.

=== Compositions ===
- Olivine Trees (electronic, 1994); composed with Chaosynth and a parallel computer
- Sacra Conversazione (orchestra and electronics, 2008); composed with support from the John Simon Guggenheim Memorial Foundation; premiered by the BBC Concert Orchestra, South Bank Centre, London.
- Mozart Reloaded (3 movements, piano and electronics, 2010); commissioned by BBC Concert Orchestra for BBC Radio 3’s The Genius of Mozart season; premiered at Banff Centre, Canada, by pianist Luciane Cardassi.
- Biocomputer Rhythms (piano and percussion, 2016); composed and performed with a biocomputing system; premiered at Peninsula Arts Contemporary Music Festival, Plymouth.
- Sound to Sea (choral symphony in 7 movements, 2018); commissioned by Peninsula Arts Contemporary Music Festival; premiered by Ten Tors Orchestra, Peninsula Arts Chorale and mezzo-soprano Juliette Pochin, Plymouth.
- Lampedusa (opera in three acts, 2019); reimagining of Shakespeare's The Tempest, includes live electronics with sonification of subatomic particle collision data; libretto by David J. Peterson in an artificial language called Vōv; premiered by BBC Singers, The House, Plymouth.
- Qubism (3 movements, chamber orchestra, electronics and quantum computer, 2023); generated with quantum algorithms, including live interaction with a quantum computer; premiered by London Sinfonietta, Kings Place, London.

== Publications ==
=== Books ===
- Computer Sound Synthesis for the Electronic Musician (Focal Press, 1998)
- Música y Nuevas Tecnologías (ed. L’Angelot, 1999)
- Composing Music with Computers (Focal Press, 2001)
- Readings in Music and Artificial Intelligence (ed. Harwood Academic, 2001)
- Computer Sound Design: Synthesis Techniques and Programming (Focal Press, 2002)
- New Digital Musical Instruments: Control and Interaction Beyond the Keyboard (with M. M. Wanderley, A-R Editions, 2006)
- Evolutionary Computer Music (ed. with J. A. Biles, Springer, 2007)
- A-Life for Music: Music and Computer Models of Living Systems (ed. A-R Editions, 2011)
- Guide to Computing for Expressive Music Performance (ed. A. Kirke, Springer, 2012)
- Thinking Music: The Inner Workings of a Composer’s Mind (University of Plymouth Press, 2014)
- Guide to Brain–Computer Music Interfacing (ed. with J. Castet, Springer, 2014)
- Guide to Unconventional Computing for Music (ed. Springer, 2017)
- Handbook of Artificial Intelligence for Music (ed., Springer, 2021)
- Quantum Computer Music (ed., Springer, 2022)
- Quantum Computing in the Arts and Humanities (ed., Springer, 2022)
- Advances in Quantum Computer Music (ed., World Scientific, 2025)

=== Selected journal articles ===
- Miranda, E. R. (2024). "The advent of quantum computer music". Reports on Progress in Physics, 87 (8):086001.
- Miranda, E. R. (2020). “Genetic Music System with Synthetic Biology”, Artificial Life, 26(3):366-390.
- Daly, I., Williams, D., Hwang, F., Kirke, A., Miranda, E. R. and Nasuto (2019). “Electroencephalography reflects the activity of sub-cortical brain regions during approach-withdrawal behaviour while listening to music”, Nature Scientific Reports, 9(9415).
- Miranda, E. R., Braund, E. and Venkatesh, S. (2018). “Composing with Biomemristors: Is Biocomputing the New Technology of Computer Music”, Computer Music Journal, 42(3).
- Daly, I., Williams, D., Hallowell, J., Hwang, F., Kirke, A., Malik, A., Weaver, J., Miranda, E., Nasuto, S. (2015). "Music-induced emotions can be predicted from a combination of brain activity and acoustic features", Brain and Cognition, 101:1-11.
- Miranda, E. R., Magee, W., Wilson, J. J., Eaton, J., and Palaniappan, R. (2011). “Brain-Computer Music Interfacing (BCMI): From Basic Research to the Real World of Special Needs", Music and Medicine, 3(3):134-140.
- Miranda, E. R. (2004). “At the Crossroads of Evolutionary Computation and Music: Self-Programming Synthesizers, Swarm Orchestras and the Origins of Melody”, Evolutionary Computation, 12(2):137-158.

== See also ==
- AIBO
- Algorithmic composition
- Artificial intelligence
- Artificial life
- Brain-computer interface
- Canadian Electroacoustic Community
- Cellular automata
- Chamber music
- Computer music
- Contemporary music
- EEG
- Electroacoustic music
- Electroencephalophone
- Electronic music
- Evolutionary computing
- Evolutionary music
- Granular synthesis
- Human-computer interaction
- Cognitive neuroscience of music
- Neural engineering
- Neuroprosthetics
- neuroscience of music
- Origins of music
- Parallel computing
- Robotics
- Sound synthesis
- Speech synthesis
