= University of Plymouth =

Public university in Plymouth, England

Coordinates: 50.374121°N 4.138512°W

- Coat of arms of the University of Plymouth
- Former names: Plymouth Polytechnic; Polytechnic South West; Rolle College; Exeter College of Art and Design; Seale-Hayne College
- Motto: Latin: Indagate Fingite Invenite
- Motto in English: Explore Dream Discover
- Type: Public
- Established: 1992 – University status 1862 – School of Navigation
- Academic affiliations: Association of Commonwealth Universities; EUA; Universities UK; Defence Universities Alliance
- Budget: £235.1 million (2021–22)
- Chancellor: Jonathan Kestenbaum, Baron Kestenbaum
- Vice-Chancellor: Richard Davies
- Faculty: 1,560
- Administrative staff: 915 (est.)
- Students: 18,910 (2020/21)
- Undergraduates: 15,200 (2020/21)
- Postgraduates: 3,710 (2020/21)
- Location: Plymouth, England
- Campus: Urban
- Colours: Terracotta; Dark Blue; Black
- Website: www.plymouth.ac.uk

The University of Plymouth is a public research university based predominantly in Plymouth, England, where the main campus is located, but the university has campuses and affiliated colleges across South West England. With 18,410 students, it is the 57th largest in the United Kingdom by total number of students (including the Open University).

== History ==
=== 1862 – 2000 ===
The university was originally founded as the Plymouth School of Navigation in 1862, before becoming a university college in 1920 and a polytechnic institute in 1970, with its constituent bodies being Plymouth Polytechnic, Rolle College in Exmouth, the Exeter College of Art and Design (which were, before April 1989, run by Devon County Council) and Seale-Hayne College (which before April 1989 was an independent charity). It was renamed Polytechnic South West in 1989, a move that was unpopular with students as the name lacked identity. It was the only polytechnic to be renamed and remained as "PSW" until gaining university status in 1992 along with the other polytechnics. The new university absorbed the Plymouth School of Maritime Studies.

=== 2000 – 2020 ===
In 2006, part of the remains of the World War II Portland Square air-raid shelter were rediscovered on the Plymouth campus. On the night of 22 April 1941, during the Blitz, a bomb fell on the site killing over 70 civilians, including a mother and her six children. The bomb blast was so strong that human remains were found in the tops of trees. Only three people escaped alive, all children.

The university's first vice-chancellor was John Bull. He was succeeded by Roland Levinsky until his death on 1 January 2007, when he walked into live electrical cables brought down during a storm. He was temporarily replaced by Mark Cleary (now vice-chancellor of the University of Bradford), and then by Steve Newstead.

Wendy Purcell became vice-chancellor on 1 December 2007, however she was later suspended in on 2 July 2014 whilst an internal review was conducted. The suspension was in part due to a dispute over the commissioning of ceremonial chairs at a cost of £95,000 without the board's approval. A linked case saw the chair of the board of governors William Taylor investigated of sexual harassment of female staff. Purcell was later appointed to a newly created role of president with compensation of £125,000 for loss of office and maintaining her salary of £250,000. A month after the review was concluded, the Higher Education Funding Council for England requested an independent external review of the university's governance. In August 2014, the university was instructed by HEFCE to undertake an external review of its governance after vice-chancellor Wendy Purcell was placed on leave.

Judith Petts was appointed the University of Plymouth's vice-chancellor and chief executive in February 2016. She joined Plymouth from the University of Southampton, where she had been pro-vice-chancellor research and enterprise and previously the inaugural dean of the Faculty of Social and Human Sciences (2010–2013).

The university was selected by the Royal Statistical Society in October 2008 to be the home of its Centre for Statistical Education. It also runs courses in maritime business, marine engineering, marine biology, and Earth, ocean and environmental sciences.

=== 2020 – present ===
In 2021 work began to completely renovate the interior and exterior of the Babbage Building. The renovations will add an extra 10,000m² worth of space to the building, and create rooftop gardens which will be open to students. Renovation works also began on the InterCity Place tower down by the Plymouth railway station.

Richard Davies was appointed the Vice-Chancellor of the University of Plymouth in October 2024 following Judith Petts's retirement. In his first official message to the university, Davies said that he would "put students first" and that he is "optimistic about the future".

In May 2025, the university announced that it had a £22 million budget shortfall shortly after announcing that over 200 jobs were risk across the organisation, and that some courses were being reviewed. Students in the affected School of Arts, Humanities, and Business started a petition against the cuts which received almost 2000 signatures. In December 2025, the university announced it had cut 351 jobs. In September 2025, the Brunel Building was demolished and replaced by a green space on campus.

In December 2025, a nitric acid spill originating in the university's Davy Building labs resulted a portion of the city centre campus being evacuated. Around 20 emergency vehicles attended the incident, and whilst the university claimed that nobody was injured, four people were treated by paramedics.

== Campus ==
When university status was gained in 1992, the university was based in on multiple sites. Under Vice-Chancellor Levinsky the university began a policy of centralising its campus activities in Plymouth.

The Exmouth campus Rolle College housed the Faculty of Education and relocated to the new Rolle Building in August 2008. The decision was unpopular with students and the town of Exmouth itself. There were several protest marches and a campaign to keep the campus open.

Recent developments include Portland Square, a library extension, refurbished and new laboratory and teaching facilities in many of the campus buildings, halls of residence near the Business School and a new £16 million Peninsula Medical School headquarters at Derriford Hospital, in the north of the city. A Marine Building has been constructed behind the Babbage Building to house civil engineering, coastal engineering and marine sciences.

=== Roland Levinsky building ===
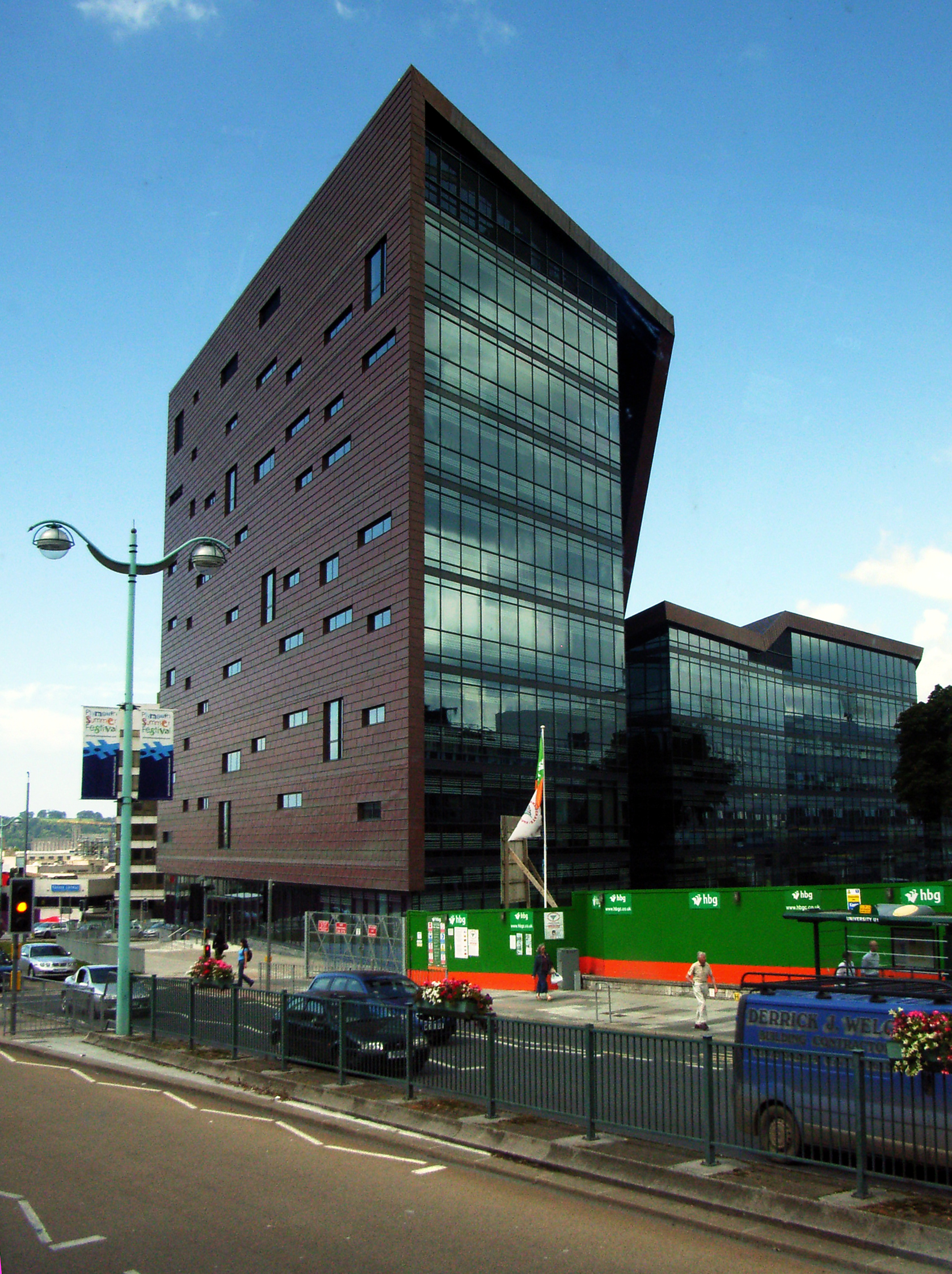
The Roland Levinsky Building

The Roland Levinsky Building, designed by architects Henning Larsen with Building Design Partnership, is clad with copper sheets in a seamed-cladding technique, is nine storeys high and has 13,000 square metres (140,000 sq ft) of floor space. The Faculty of Arts, previously based in Exmouth and Exeter moved here in August 2007. The building contains two large lecture theatres, the Jill Craigie Cinema, used by the film students to display their films and for showing of films to the public; three performance rehearsal studios; digital media suites; and a public art gallery which displays work by local artists groups, students and famous artists.

=== Intercity Place ===
Intercity Place is an 11-story tower building adjacent to Plymouth railway station currently undergoing renovations to turn the building into a centre for students studying medical degrees. The tower is being renovated by contractor Kier Group and is set to open in 2023. The building used to be the Intercity House office block. The building is currently owned by Network Rail, but is being given to the university on a 150-year lease. The renovated building will provide a brand new space to train and develop the next generation of nurses, midwives and allied health professionals from the School of Health Professions and School of Nursing and Midwifery.

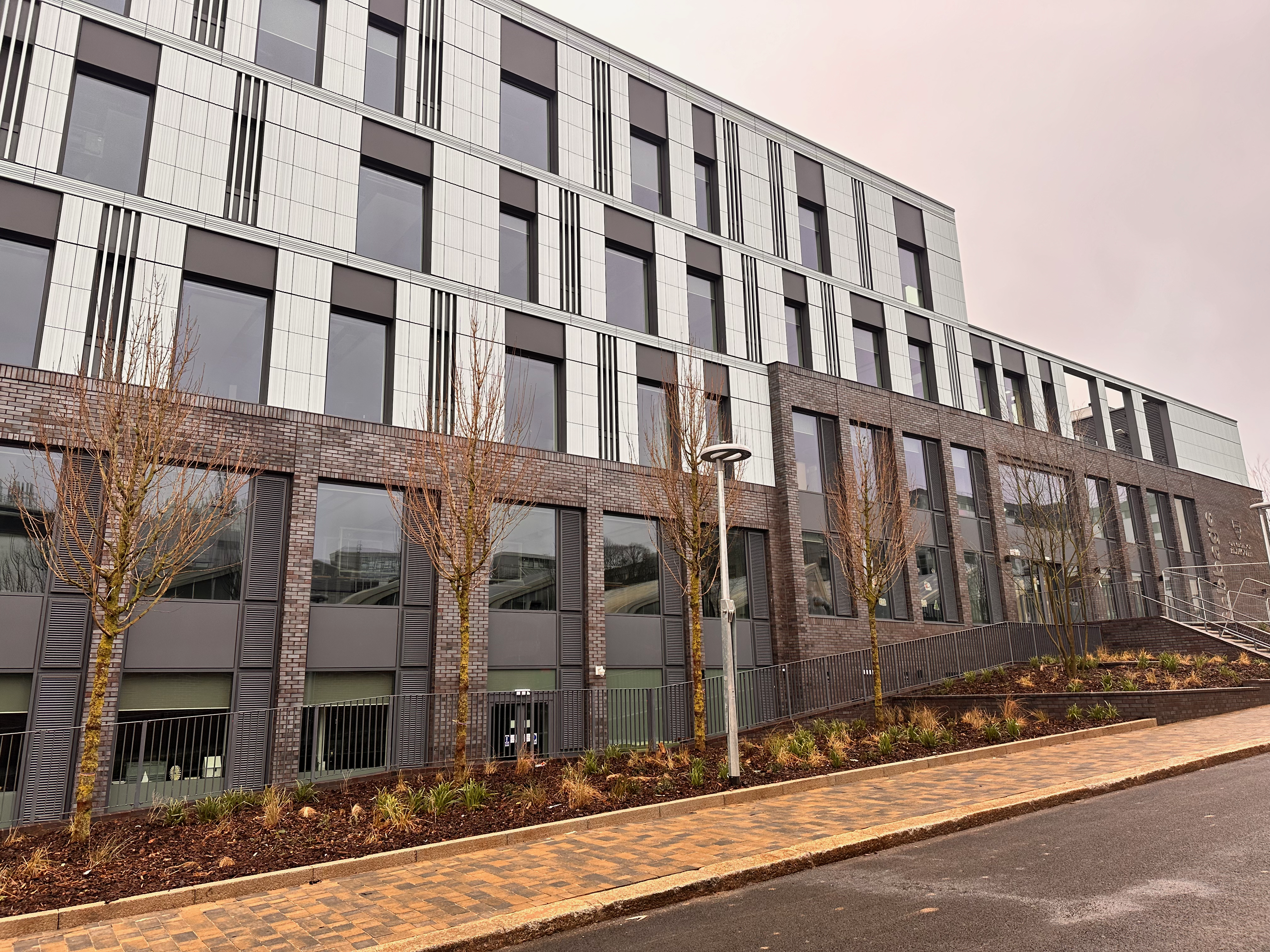
Babbage Building

=== Babbage Building ===
The Babbage Building, also known as the New Engineering and Design Facility, is a teaching building named after Charles Babbage, a mathematician, philosopher, inventor and mechanical engineer who originated the concept of a digital programmable computer. After renovations in 2021–2023, the building contains a number of fabrication and computing laboratories.

=== Student accommodation ===
University-managed or approved accommodation in the first year of study is guaranteed for all applicants who choose Plymouth as their first choice institution. The university provides an approved accommodation database, which is available to all continuing students. There are six university-managed halls: Francis Drake, Gilwell, Mary Newman, Pilgrim, Radnor and Robbins. Special accommodation arrangements can be made for students with disabilities or medical conditions.

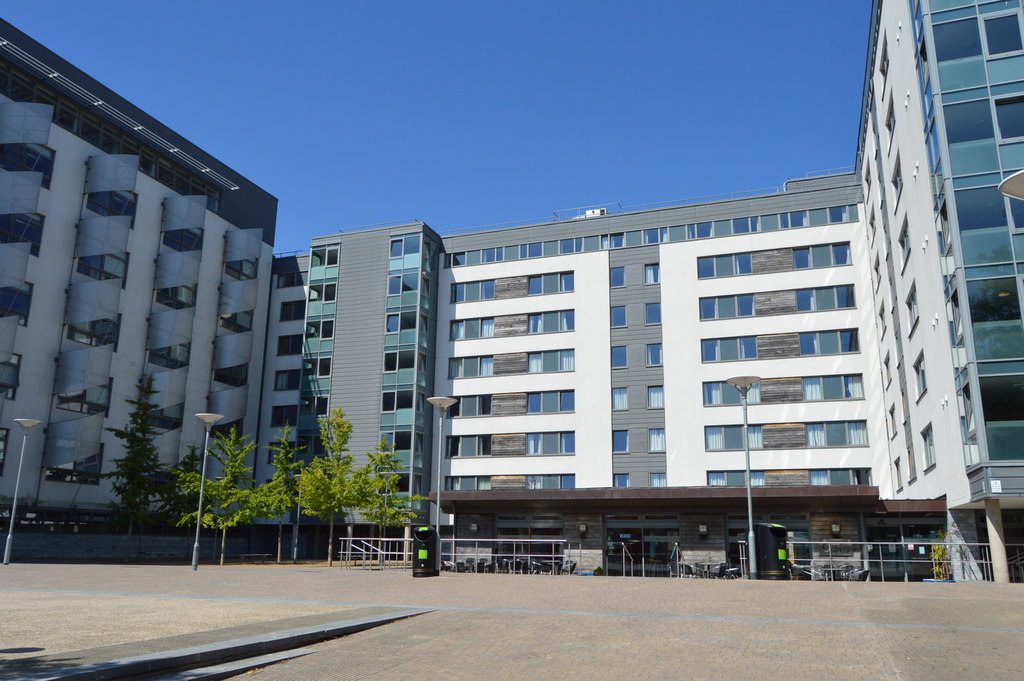
Francis Drake

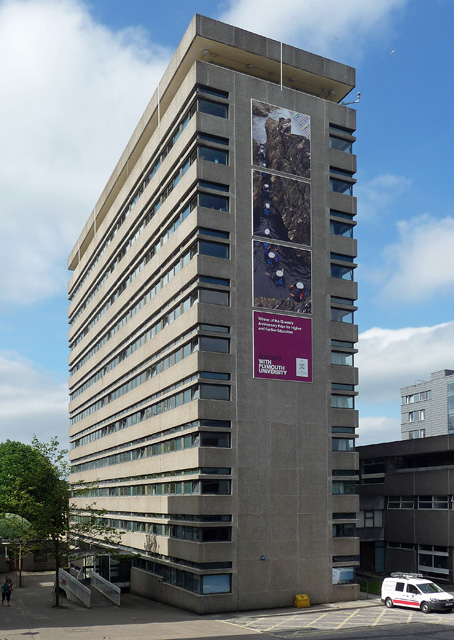
Mary Newman

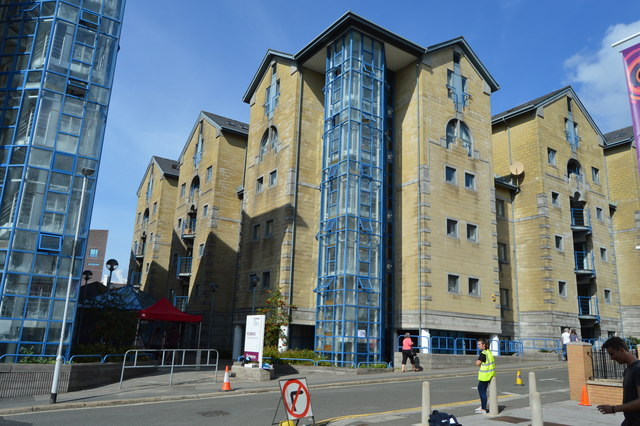
Robbins

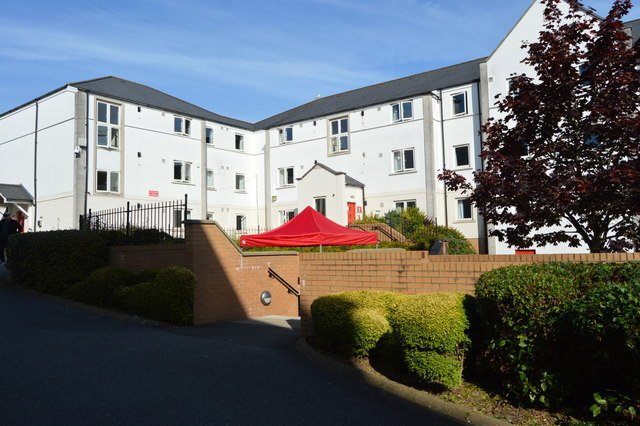
Radnor

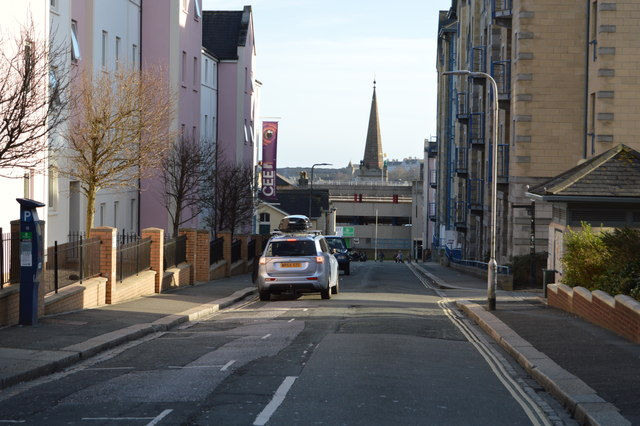
Gibbon St (Left: Pilgrim, Right: Robbins)

== Organisation and administration ==
=== Faculties ===
There are three faculties which each contain a number of schools:

1. Arts, Humanities and Business
2. Health
3. Science and Engineering

=== Coat of arms ===
The Arms, Crest, Badge and Supporters forming the university’s Coat of Arms were granted on 10 April 2008, in Grant 173/189, by the College of Arms.

The books represent the university's focus on learning and scholarship. The scattering of small stars, represent navigation, which has played a key role in the history of the city and the university. The scallop shells in gold, represents pilgrimage, a sign of the importance of the departure of the Pilgrim Fathers from a site near the Mayflower Steps in the Plymouth Barbican aboard the Mayflower in 1620. A Pelican and a Golden Hind support the shield and reflect both the original and later, better known, name of Sir Francis Drake's ship. The crest contains the Latin motto, "Indagate Fingite Invenite" which translates as "Explore Dream Discover" and is a quote from Mark Twain, reflecting the university's ambitions for its students and Plymouth's history of great seafarers.

The Letters Patent granting Arms to the University of Plymouth were presented by Eric Dancer, Lord Lieutenant of Devon, in a ceremony on 27 November 2008, in the presence of Henry Paston-Bedingfeld, York Herald of the College of Arms, the Lord Mayor and Lady Mayoress of Plymouth, Judge William Taylor, the Recorder of Plymouth, and Baroness Judith Wilcox.

The Coat of Arms are rarely seen in use, other than at graduation. The university uses the "with Plymouth University" brand on stationery and signs and keeps the Coat of Arms exclusive. The use of the arms is therefore restricted to graduations and other formal ceremonies, degree certificates and associated materials and the exclusive use by the Office of the Vice-Chancellor.

== Academic profile ==
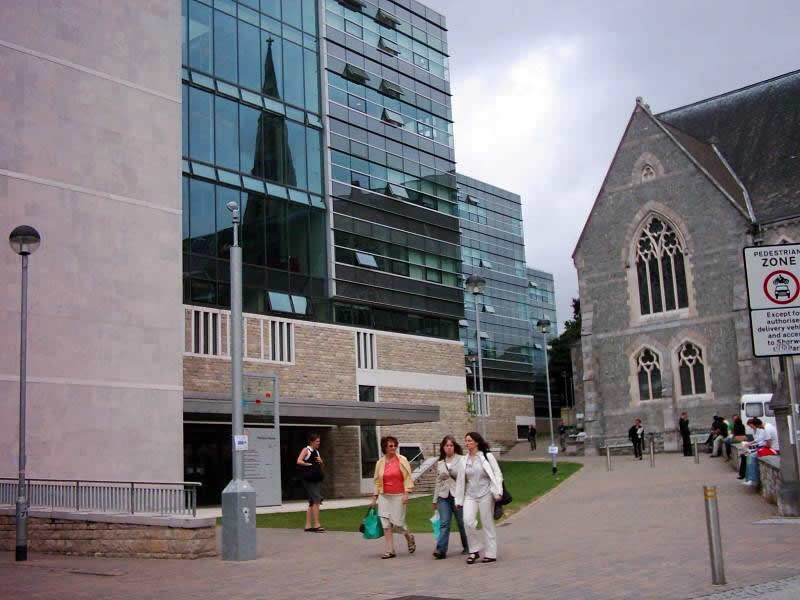
The Portland Square Building

A wide variety of undergraduate and postgraduate programmes are taught at the main city campus in Plymouth. The university scores well in law, psychology, geographical sciences, computing (including digital media) and computer science, fine art and art history. Key developments include: the creation of a new business school; bringing together complementary subjects in a new combined faculty of Science and Engineering; and creating the largest marine science and engineering school in Europe.

=== Faculty of Arts and Humanities ===
This faculty is host to the School of Art, Design and Architecture, the School of Humanities and Performing Arts, and the Plymouth Institute of Education. Arts subjects are usually taught in the Roland Levinsky building and the Scott building, a 19th-century building located next to Roland Levinsky which was modernised externally in 2008 to keep to the university's current design.

The faculty offers degrees in Architecture, Built environment, English, History, Illustration, Art history, 3D Design, Fine Art, Music, Photography, Media arts, Theatre & Performance and Dance Theatre. Postgraduate research degree supervision is available across the disciplines in all three Schools, with specific expertise in artistic research.

=== Faculty of Health ===
Home to the Schools of Psychology, Social Science and Social Work, Health Professions, and Nursing and Midwifery. As well as PGCE programmes, the Faculty offers degrees in Adult Nursing, Child Health Nursing, Mental Health Nursing, Midwifery, Dietetics, Optometry, Social Work, Occupational Therapy, Physiotherapy and Paramedicine.

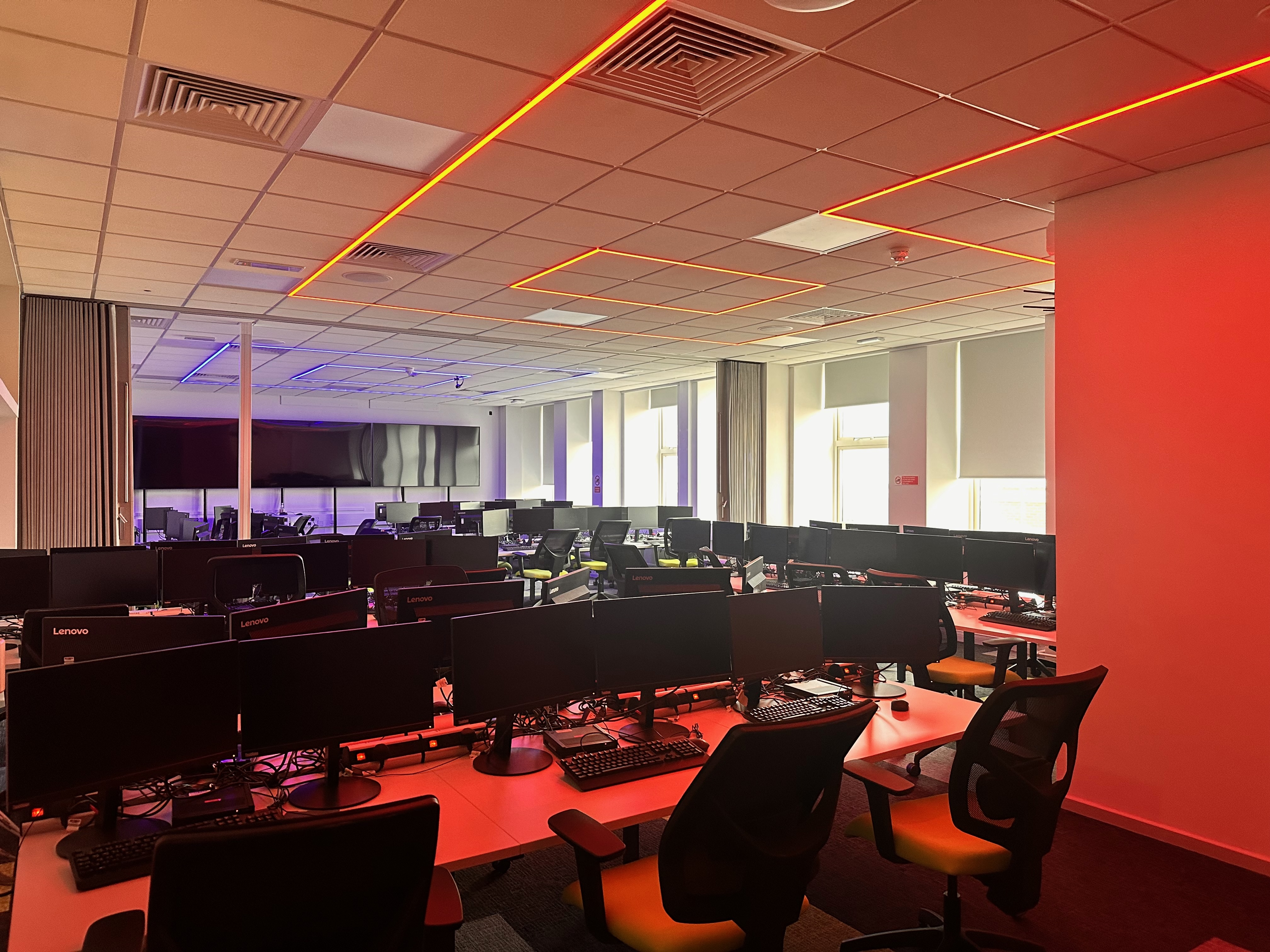
Cyber security lab at the university.

=== Faculty of Science and Engineering ===
This faculty is home to the School of Biological and Marine Sciences, the School of Engineering, Computing and Mathematics, and the School of Geography, Earth and Environmental Sciences.

The university provides professional diving qualifications on a number of its courses, the only university in the country to do so. The university's diving centre is located within its Marine Station teaching and research facility based next to Queen Anne's Battery marina, and has a full-time team of instructors and dedicated boats and equipment.

In October 2005, The Sun newspaper voted the university as having the most bizarre degree course in the country, the BSc (Hons) in Surf Science & Technology. Commonly known as "surfing", this course is actually centred on coastal and ocean sciences, surfing equipment, clothing design, and surfing-related business, which is popular owing to the geographical location of the university.

=== Faculty of Business ===
The faculty is home to the Plymouth Business School, the School of Law, Criminology and Government, the Plymouth Graduate School of Management and the School of Tourism and Hospitality. Plymouth's Business School has most notably been very successful in national rankings by subject, where subjects like economics have ranked 16th, according to The Guardian. Plymouth Graduate School of Management also offers Maritime Studies through the BSc (Hons) Maritime Business and Maritime Law and the MSc in International Shipping.

The university has strong links with the cruising industry, offering courses in the Maritime and Cruising sector. The school offers BSc (Hons) in Cruise Management, where students can opt to take a year out to work with P&O or Princess Cruises for two four-month periods.

=== Plymouth University Peninsula Schools of Medicine and Dentistry ===
Medicine and Dentistry were first established as part of the Peninsula College of Medicine and Dentistry in 2000, which operated as a partnership between Plymouth University and the University of Exeter. In January 2012 the two founding members of the Peninsula College of Medicine and Dentistry (PCMD) the Universities of Exeter and Plymouth, outlined their plans to expand independently and grow the success of the now nationally recognised professional health education provider. These changes came into effect from the start of the 2013 academic year. PUPSMD consists of the School of Medicine, the School of Dentistry, and the School of Biomedical and Healthcare Sciences.

=== Academic Partnerships ===
The Academic Partnerships network is a collaboration between the university and local colleges across the South West and South of England. There are hundreds of higher education courses available providing opportunities for progression to other qualifications. For example, someone who has spent two years studying for a foundation degree at their local college – and who has successfully passed their exams – can move on to the final year of a full honours degree at the university.

- British College of Osteopathic Medicine
- Bicton College
- Bridgwater College
- City of Bristol College
- City College Plymouth
- Cornwall College
- Exeter College
- European School of Osteopathy
- Greenwich School of Management (GSoM), London
- International University in Geneva
- MLA College
- Petroc
- Plymouth College of Art and Design (until 2006)
- Truro and Penwith College
- Somerset College
- South Devon College

Academic Partnerships associates include:

- Tor Bridge High
- Highlands College, Jersey
- Strode College
- Weymouth College

Plymouth is the main sponsor of Marine Academy Plymouth. It is also the main sponsor of UTC Plymouth, which opened in September 2013.

=== Reputation and rankings ===
Rankings
National rankings
- Complete (2027): 67
- Guardian (2027): 84
- Times / Sunday Times (2027): 69

Global rankings
- ARWU (2026): 601–700
- QS (2027): 691=
- THE (2026): 501–600

The University of Plymouth ranks 503rd in the CWUR World University Rankings 2017 In The Times and Sunday Times University League Table 2018, the University of Plymouth's world ranking was listed as joint 701st and 601–650 in QS World University Rankings 2019. Times Higher Education ranked Plymouth 401–500 in its World University Rankings 2017–18, and ranked it 65th among 200 institutions in its World Young University Rankings 2017.

The results of the 2014 Research Excellence Framework showed that, overall, Plymouth was ranked joint 66 of 128 UK institutions, rising 9 places from the previous Research Assessment Exercise in 2008. Across all assessed subject areas Plymouth showed substantial evidence of 3* (internationally excellent) and 4* (world leading) research, and this was particularly evident in Clinical Medicine, Computer Sciences & Informatics, Psychology, Psychiatry & Neuroscience, and Earth Systems & Environmental Sciences, where 79–85% of research was ranked as 3* or 4*.

Plymouth was the first university to be awarded the Social Enterprise Mark in recognition of working as a genuine social enterprise, caring for communities and protecting the planet.

== Notable academics ==
Staff include political scientists/psephologists Colin Rallings and Michael Thrasher, who have written extensively on electoral systems, voting behaviour, polling results and British politics. Other notable academics include mathematician Richard Jozsa; health informatician Maged N. Kamel Boulos; composer and filmmaker Alexis Kirke; Professor in Computer music and composer Eduardo Reck Miranda; Roy Lowry who in August 2006 broke the world record for launching the most rockets at once; Iain Stewart who has fronted BBC documentaries such as Journeys into the Ring of Fire and Journeys from the Centre of the Earth; Alexis Kirke an interdisciplinary performer and artist; sociologist John Scott, a sociologist focused on elites, power, social stratification, and social network analysis; Jacqueline Andrade, professor of psychology; and Richard Thompson, who coined the term "microplastics". Emeritus Professor Jonathan St B. T. Evans from the school of Psychology has contributed greatly to the discussion of Dual-Process theory and has been publishing for over 40 years. Dr. Mike McCulloch, physicist and developer of the Quantised Inertia Theory.

== Notable alumni ==
Alumni include the world's youngest single-handed cross-Atlantic sailor Seb Clover, historian Philip Payton, BBC wildlife presenter Monty Halls, television presenter Michael Underwood, life peer Judith Wilcox, Baroness Wilcox, (Plymouth Polytechnic), travel writer and physician Jane Wilson-Howarth, children's author Steve Augarde, artists Sue Austin, Julian Bovis, Pen Dalton, Andrea Polli, Hatice Güleryüz, multimedia artist and scholar Ellen Levy, computer scientist at IBM Mandy Chessell, MP for Bristol North West Darren Jones, politician Tim Bearder, journalist Matt Cooke, politicians Laura Anne Jones, Mark Williams and Darius J. Pearce, marine biologists Heather Koldewey and David Sims, meteorologist Clare Nasir, humanitarian Harrison Dax Nash, members of the band Meeky Rosie, Indonesian businessman and politician Jaka Singgih, and Tom Rivett-Carnac, Officer of the United Nations Framework Convention on Climate Change.

== Students' union ==
University of Plymouth Students' Union, usually abbreviated "UPSU" is a non-profit making organisation. Each year, students elect the officers who will represent them for the following year. The Union offers a range of services and stages a number of events throughout the year. As well as events, the Union is the base for most of the sports teams and societies at the university.

== See also ==
- Plymouth Marjon University
- Armorial of UK universities
- Greenwich School of Management, Greenwich, south-east London
- List of universities in the UK
- Post-1992 universities
- Schumacher College
