= Vowles =

Vowles is a surname. It may refer to:

- Adrian Vowles (born 1971), Australian rugby league player
- Andrew Vowles (born 1967), British trip hop musician best known for his work with Massive Attack
- Henry Hayes Vowles (1843–1905), English theologian and author
- Hugh Pembroke Vowles (1885–1951), British engineer, socialist and author
- James Vowles, Team Principal of the Williams Racing Formula One team
- Ken Vowles, Australian politician
- Margaret Winifred Vowles (1882-1932), English author on science
- William Vowles (1876-1943), Australian politician
- W.G. Vowles (1826-1912), English organ-builder
