= Henry Hayes Vowles =

English author, theologian and Wesleyan Minister

Reverend Henry Hayes Vowles, photograph taken in Guernsey in about 1900

Henry Hayes Vowles (26 June 1843, Victoria Park Farm, Bath, England – 13 November 1905, Gloucester, England) was an English author, theologian and a Wesleyan Minister. He also published religious poetry.

== Family ==
He was the son of Henry Vowles of Bath and Mary Yeoman Harding of "The Chancellor" Wanstrow, Somerset. His father, Henry, is recorded as being employed in a number of roles. In 1838, he is noted as a "yeoman" on a wedding certificate. In 1851, his occupation was described as a "Carrier's Agent". In 1871, his occupation was recorded as "farmer"

His mother, Mary Yeoman Vowles née Harding, led "a life of much sadness, but her sweet disposition, like her mother's, made her a favourite with everybody". Mary Harding's brother was Joseph Harding who standardised the production of modern cheddar cheese. The Harding family had originally come from Pewsey, Wiltshire.

He had three siblings. Their mother Mary Vowles née Harding died at Stalbridge and was buried beside her son Alonzo's grave (see image).

== Career ==
Vowles was ordained in 1867.

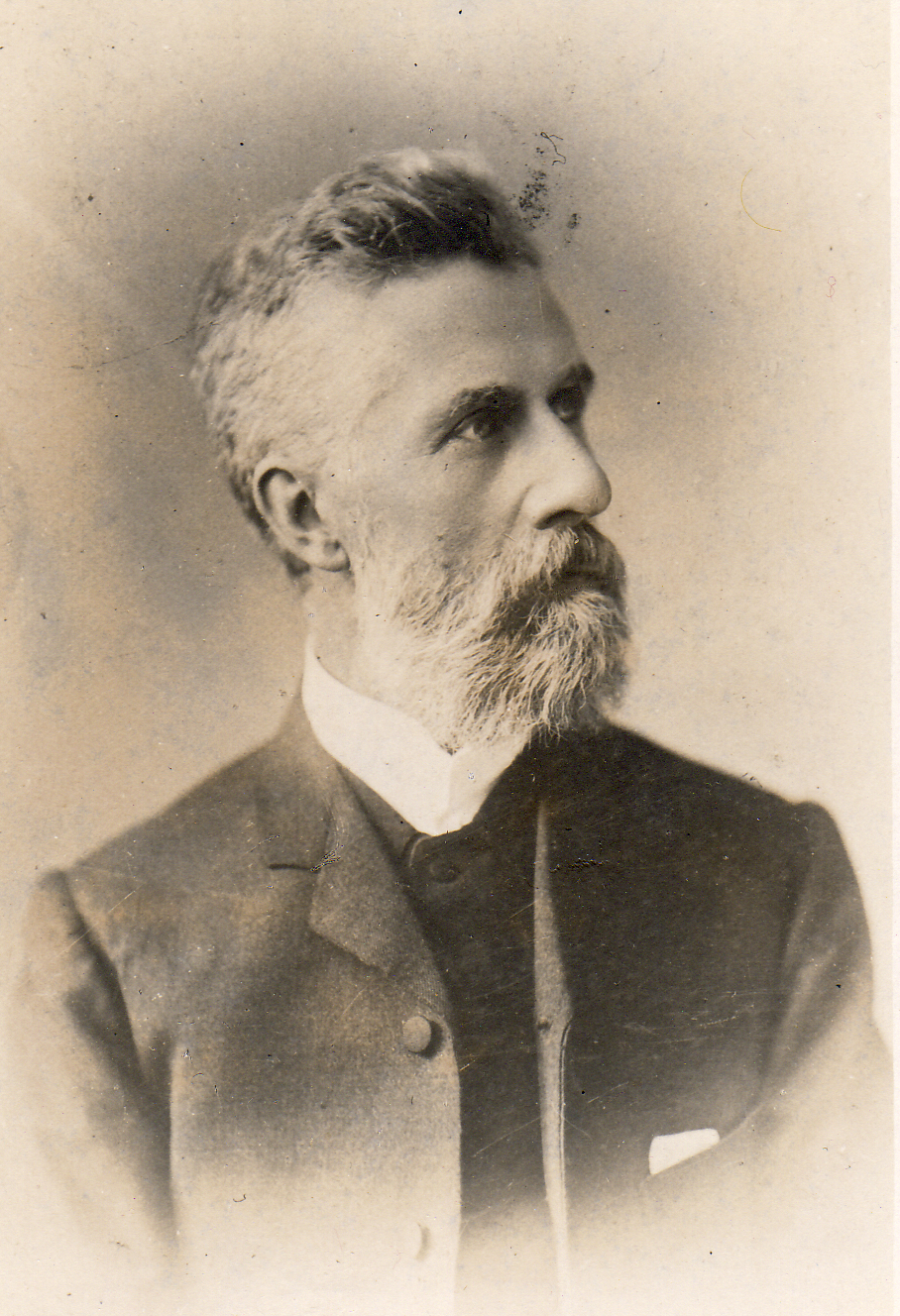

During his lifetime, he also ministered in the following circuits: Faversham, Nelson, Blackpool, Birmingham, Pembroke, Stockton-on-Tees, Southwark, Gateshead and Barnsley. He was also based at Southwark

He went to work in Gloucester in 1895 as Superintendent of the Gloucester Wesleyan Circuit, which post he held for three years. He then went to Guernsey as Chairman of the Channel Islands District. In 1901, he returned to Gloucester as Supernumerary Minister. He was an accomplished Hebrew and Greek scholar and published at least two of his sermons. He served on the Gloucester City Education Committee.

In 1901, he was resident at St Peter Port, Guernsey.

== Marriage and children ==
He married Hannah Elizabeth Thistle (18 November 1842 – 31 March 1903 and buried at Gloucester Cemetery) at St Mary's church Whitby on 29 August 1871. Hannah Elizabeth Thistle was born at 157 Mill Street, Liverpool and was the daughter of Thomas Thistle (1813–1892) and Alice Smith (1876–1893). This Thomas Thistle was the son of Thomas and Martha Thistle (née Wilson) of Blue Band (?), Whitby. Hannah Vowles was the sister of Thomas Thistle. Alice Smith was the daughter of George Smith.

In 1881 he was resident at Thornaby, Yorkshire.

He had seven children:

- Thomas Hubert Harding Vowles, became an architect in Gloucester and Beningbrough, York)
- Alice Thistle Vowles (1874 – 1928)
- Mary Yeoman Hardinge Vowles (born 1876). Married Henry Allen Pearce of Priday, Metford and Company Limited
- Henry Hayes Vowles (junior) (1878-1955) who was a solicitor in Gloucester and a Captain in the Gloucestershire Regiment in the first world war.
- Brenley Mabel Vowles (born 1879) later keeper of the Cottage Tea Room, Caterham
- Guy Vowles (born 1882, died 1936)
- Hugh Pembroke Vowles born died 1951). Married Margaret Winifred Pearce

== Publications (books) ==
- For Ever and Ever: A Popular Study in Hebrew, Greek and English Words published by Swan Sonnenschein & Co (London), 1898.
- Two Sermons. I. King David and Queen Victoria. II. King Lemuel and King Edward published by C. H. Kelly: London, 1901.

== Publications (poetry) ==
- Poem published in 1889 in the Wesleyan-Methodist Magazine: Being a Continuation of the Arminian Or Methodist Magazine
- Poem entitled "An Advent Sonnet" published in the Wesleyan-Methodist Magazine. Date uncertain.
- Poem entitled "Sinai" published in the Wesleyan-Methodist. Date uncertain.

== Death and obituaries ==
Vowles died at his residence, Holmleigh, Kingsholm, Gloucester

- A number of obituaries were published at the time of his death, in local Gloucester papers and Methodist publications. The following is repeated here verbatim:

"Henry H. Vowles: was born at Bath, 26 June 1843, and entered the Ministry in 1867. His first appointment was to Faversham, and he laboured in the active ministry until the Conference of 1901. He was an able preacher, a vigorous thinker, and a man of scholarly attainments. His freshness of thought and his power of lucid exposition made his sermons attractive and profitable. His sympathy with the young, his sound judgment, and his varied attainments won for him the confidence and affection of our people. He was cheerful and patient during his painful and prolonged illness, and his faith in his Lord and Saviour was expressed in the words of the Psalm which he had chosen to be read on the day of his burial: "The Lord is my light and my salvation; whom shall I fear? The Lord is the strength of my life; of whom shall I be afraid?". Much more might be said of his character and ministry; but it was his earnest request that as little as possible might be written about him. He died at Gloucester, 13 November 1905 in his sixty-third year and in the thirty-eighth of his ministry."
