= Margaret Pearse (disambiguation) =

Margaret Pearse (1857–1932) was an Irish politician.

Margaret Pearse may also refer to:

- Margaret Mary Pearse (1878–1968), Irish politician, daughter of Margaret Pearse

== See also ==
- Margaret Pearce
- Margaret Pierce (disambiguation)
