= Pendred =

Pendred is a surname. Notable people with this surname include:

- Cathal Pendred (born 1987), Irish-American martial artist and actor
- Lawrence Pendred (1899–1986), Royal Air Force officer
- Loughnan St Lawrence Pendred (1870–1953), British mechanical engineer and editor
- Pleasance Pendred (1864–1948), British women's rights campaigner
- Stuart Pendred, British(?) singer

== See also ==
- Pendred syndrome, genetic disorder named after Vaughan Pendred
