= The Quest for Power =

1931 book by Hugh Pembroke Vowles and Margaret Winifred Vowles

The Quest for Power: From Prehistoric Times to the Present Day
- Title page for The Quest for Power: From Prehistoric Times to the Present Day (1931)
- Author: Hugh Pembroke Vowles, Margaret Winifred Vowles
- Publication date: 1931

The Quest for Power: From Prehistoric Times to the Present Day is a book on the history of engineering written by Hugh Pembroke Vowles and Margaret Winifred Vowles. It was published in 1931 by Chapman and Hall of London, England.

== Content ==
The book contains over 150 illustrations and has 370 pages. It begins with a picture of Michael Faraday. The book is divided into three parts. The first is "The apprenticeship of toil", which deals with stone tools, early use of metal, control of water, early structural achievements, transport and measurement. The second is "The age of Power". This deals with steam power, internal combustion engines and electrical power. Finally, the third part is entitled "The materials of power". This looks at coal, oil, alcohol, metals and other products. The last section deals with the future.

== Dedication ==
The Quest for Power is dedicated to Hubert Cecil Booth, inventor of the vacuum cleaner. The dedication reads: "In friendship's name to Hubert Cecil Booth, F.C.G.I., M. Inst. C.E. who by the invention and subsequent development of the vacuum cleaner has created a new industry, lightened the burden of human toil, and increased the health and happiness of innumberable homes".

== Reception ==
The flier advertising the book contained the following quotation:

"Eighty British, American and European journals – representative of all that is best in the periodical literature of Science, Engineering, Arts and Industry, besides literary "weeklies" and the daily press – have devoted over five hundred single column inches of their space to reviews of The Quest for Power. A few typical comments are quoted overleaf"

== Press opinions from scientific, engineering and industrial journals ==
- "No other book in the English language gives so satisfactory an account of engineering progress through the ages". Engineer Index of the American Society of Mechanical Engineers.
- "The book will clearly be of great permanent value as a work of reference, all the more because of its full citation of sources... a notable addition to any engineer's library. Sir Alfred Ewing K.C.B. D.Sc. F.R.S. (President Elect, British Association for the Advancement of Science 1932)
- "A remarkable work". Journal of the Royal Society of Arts.
- "The book is an admirable result of the combined work of an engineer and a historian ". Nature, 12 March 1932.
- "We hope every engineer will spare the time to read this book". Engineer, 16 October 1931
- "It is inspired". Electrical Industries. 25 November 1931.
- "It is exhilarating; it is so broad in its sweep that we have marvelled both at the courage of the authors and at their vision". Power Engineer, March 1932.
- "No mere summary of contents can possibly convey the full merit of this book; its balance, perspective and sustained interest". Power (New York) 12 January 1932.
- "An epic story of man's triumph over difficulty". Electrical Power Engineer, 1931.
- "There runs all through the book the golden thread of romance and adventure, of struggle and achievement". Austin Magazine, 1932.
- "Auch vielen deutschen Ingenieuren wird diser Uberblick sehr willkommen sein". Zeitschrift des Vereines Deutscher Ingenieure (Dr Conrad Matchoss). 19 March 1932.

== Press opinions from newspapers and literary journals ==
"A miracle of consisement and comprehensiveness combined" Morning Post (E.B.Osborn) 4 September 1931

"The book deserves to become a standard work for the general educated reader, especially for arts mentaking a degree in history, for students in technical colleges and schools". Manchester Guardian, 7 April 1932.

"This clear, careful, comprehensive work". News Chronicle (W.R. Gordon), 2 September 1931.

"One of the most exciting stories in the world... splendidly illustrated". Daily Herald, (Roger Pippett), 17 December 1931.

"Useful and trustworthy... the authors show a wide knowledge of the subject". Spectator, 26 September 1931.

"Gives the layman admirable lucid accounts of the major machines and processes which have given modern man such colossal power". New Statesman and Nation. 20 February 1932.
