= Henry Winram Dickinson =

British engineering historian (1870–1952)

Henry Winram Dickinson

Henry Winram Dickinson (28 August 1870 – 21 February 1952) was a British engineering historian and biographer who spent much of his career at the Science Museum (1895–1930), where he rose to be senior keeper of the mechanical engineering department. His biographies include Robert Fulton (1913), John Wilkinson (1914), James Watt (1936) and Matthew Boulton (1937), and he also published a history of the steam engine (1939). He was a founding member of the Newcomen Society, of which he was president (1932–34), and served as editor of their Transactions (1920–50); he is commemorated in the society's Dickinson memorial lecture.

== Early life and education ==
Dickinson was born at Ulverston in Lancashire on 28 August 1870, to Margaret Anne (née Winram) and John Dickinson, who ran an iron and steel company. Henry Dickinson was educated at the local Victoria Grammar School and later Manchester Grammar School, and then read engineering at Owens College (Victoria University of Manchester). He served an apprenticeship and worked for several years in the Glasgow iron and steel industry.

== Career ==
In 1895, Dickinson gained an assistant role in the South Kensington Museum's science department – the Science Museum from 1909. Apart from the First World War, when he served on the Ministry of Munitions' inventions panel (1915–18), he remained at the Science Museum until his retirement in 1930, rising to the machinery division's assistant keeper (1900), keeper of the mechanical engineering department (1924) and at the time of his retirement, senior keeper; from 1914 he was also secretary to the museum's advisory council. While at the Science Museum he was responsible for acquiring and displaying James Watt's engines, as well as the contents of his Handsworth workshop.

One of the founding members of the Newcomen Society in 1920, he was its president (1932–34), honorary secretary (1920–32, 1934–51) and the editor of its Transactions (1920–50), the last described in Nature as "[h]is greatest work". He was credited as a major reason for the society's success. In 1923 and 1938, he toured the United States giving lectures; these visits were credited with stimulating the foundation of the Newcomen Society of the United States. Lehigh University, Pennsylvania, awarded him an honorary doctorate in engineering (1938).

He published biographies of key figures in the Industrial Revolution, Robert Fulton (1913), John Wilkinson (1914), Richard Trevithick (with Arthur Titley; 1934), James Watt (1936) and Matthew Boulton (1937), described by Arthur Stowers in his Oxford Dictionary of National Biography article as "definitive". In 1927, with Rhys Jenkins, he published James Watt and the Steam Engine, described in his obituary in The Guardian as a "monumental volume". He was particularly interested in the steam engine, on which he published a history in 1939, and was vice-president of the Cornish Engines Preservation Society. He wrote many articles for the Newcomen Society, the Institution of Mechanical Engineers and The Engineer.

== Personal life and legacy ==
He was married twice: in 1897 to Edith Emerson, and after her death in 1937, to Elsa Lees Burgan in 1939. His first marriage resulted in a son, Henry Douglas Dickinson (1899–1969), an economist.

Henry Winram Dickinson died on 21 February 1952 at Purley in Surrey. The Newcomen Society honoured him with their biennial Dickinson memorial lecture (1954), first given by Charles Singer; the Newcomen Society of the United States commemorated him with a memorial plaque in the Thomas Newcomen Library of West Chester, Pennsylvania. His research notes are archived at the Science Museum.

== Publications ==
- Robert Fulton, Engineer and Artist: His Life and Works (1913)
- John Wilkinson (1914)
- James Watt and the Steam Engine (with Rhys Jenkins; 1927)
- Richard Trevithick: The Engineer and the Man (with Arthur Titley; 1934)
- James Watt: Craftsman and Engineer (1936)
- Matthew Boulton (1937)
- A Short History of the Steam Engine (1939)
- James Watt and the Industrial Revolution (with H. P. Vowles; 1944, 1948)
- Water Supply of Greater London (1954)
- Sir Samuel Morland, Diplomat and Inventor, 1625–1695 (1970)
