= Hugh Pembroke Vowles =

British engineer, socialist and author

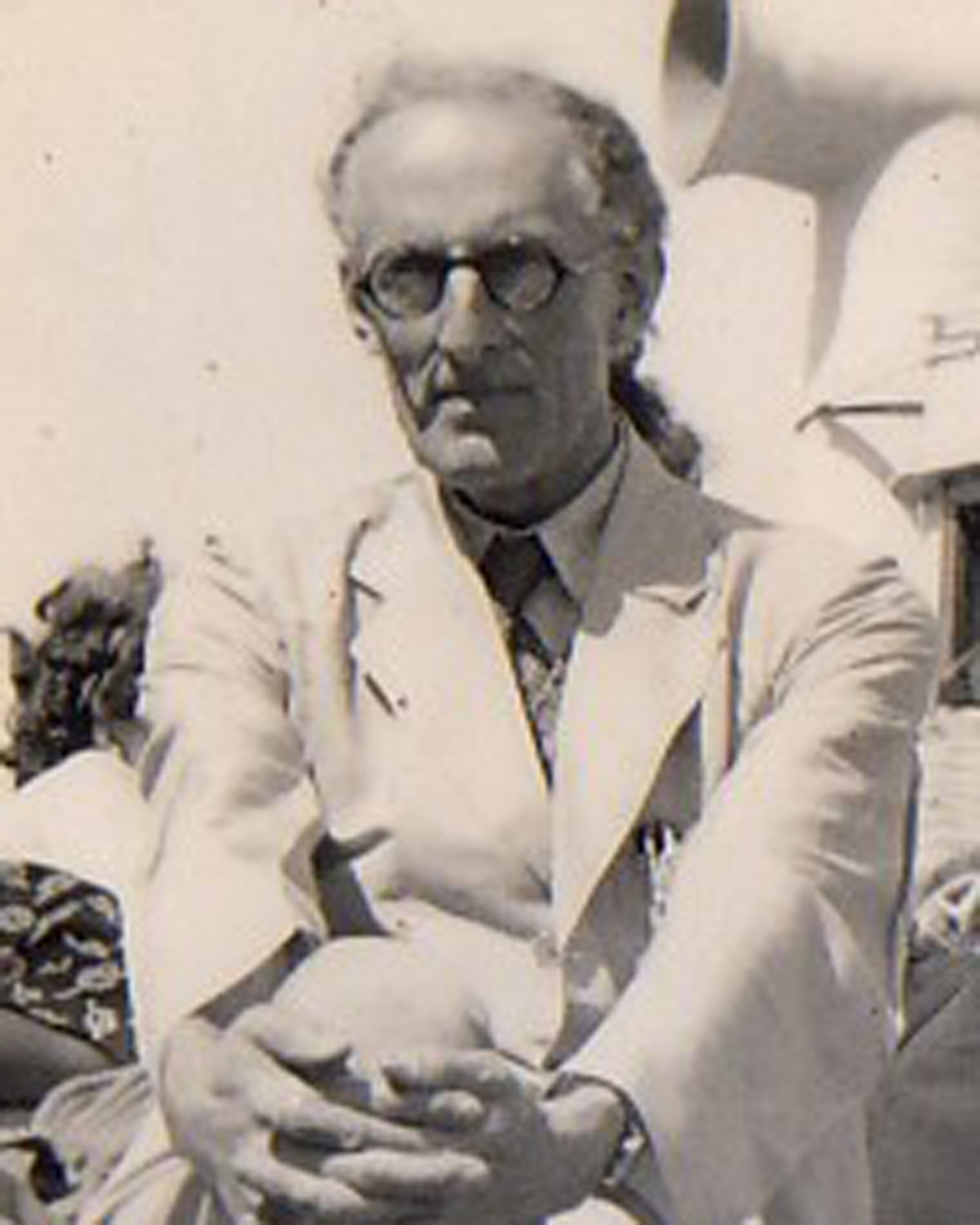
Hugh Pembroke Vowles

Hugh Pembroke Vowles (1885 – 1951) was a British engineer, socialist and author.

== Early life and education ==
Reverend Henry Hayes Vowles, father of William Hugh Pembroke Vowles. Photograph taken in Guernsey in about 1900

Hugh Vowles was the son of Henry Hayes Vowles, a Wesleyan minister, author, and theologian; and of Hannah Elizabeth Thistle. Although he published under the name Hugh Pembroke Vowles, early records refer to him as William Hugh Pembroke Vowles.

He married twice. First to Margaret Winifred Pearce of the Pearce family of Priday, Metford and Company Limited. After her death, he married Eleanor Biss.

He was educated at Elizabeth College, Guernsey, and at the Technical School, Gloucester, where he served an apprenticeship and passed through the shops and drawing office of W. Sisson Ltd, power plant engineers from 1901 to 1906. After gaining experience as a junior draughtsman with G Waller and Son Ltd of Stroud, Gloucester, he was employed from 1909 to 1913 as a contract engineer with Messrs Williams and Rugby Robinson. This was followed by a brief connexion with the Gas Light and Coke Company as senior assistant engineer. During World War I, he first acted as assistant district manager to the Metropolitan Munitions Committee and later as assistant manager at the Ailsa National Shell Factory, London.

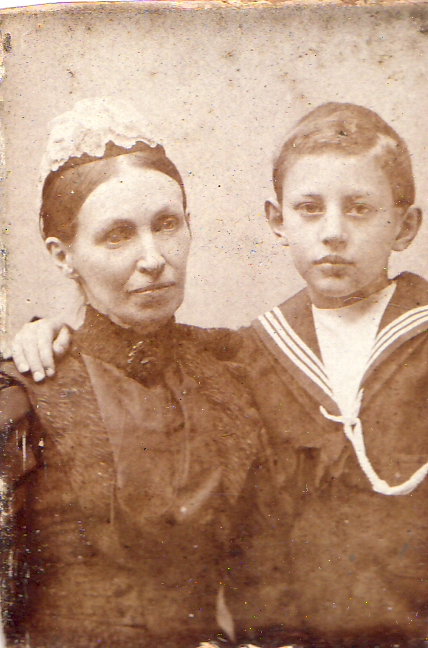
Hugh Pembroke Vowles as a child with his mother Hannah Elizabeth Thistle

In 1918, he became associated with Cox and Company Ltd, bankers of London as technical advisor and factory manager. In April 1921, he was resident at Redcliff, Caswell Bay, Glamorganshire and was described as "general manager and Chief Engineer to a large industrial concern" In 1922, he went to join W.H. Allen, Sons & Co Ltd mechanical and electrical engineers, for which firm he was engaged as district manager and engineer of the Cardiff office until 1929, when he went into practice on his own account as a consulting engineer.

== Later life ==
During the 1939–1945 war, he was editor of technical literature for the British Council, London; he travelled to London on Monday mornings after spending the weekend at home at the Leaze, Oxlynch. He was a member of the Institution of Mechanical Engineers, of the Newcomen Society, the Society of Authors and the American Society of Mechanical Engineers. He was a self-declared communist and had a keen interest in the Soviet Union, in particular the Ukraine. Because of his fondness for the Soviet Union he was known to his family as "Popski". He owned a cat called Pushkin. He retired in 1929 to devote himself to his writing. He continued to write articles for technical journals and newspapers. He was a frequent contributor to The Citizen of Gloucester.

== Children ==
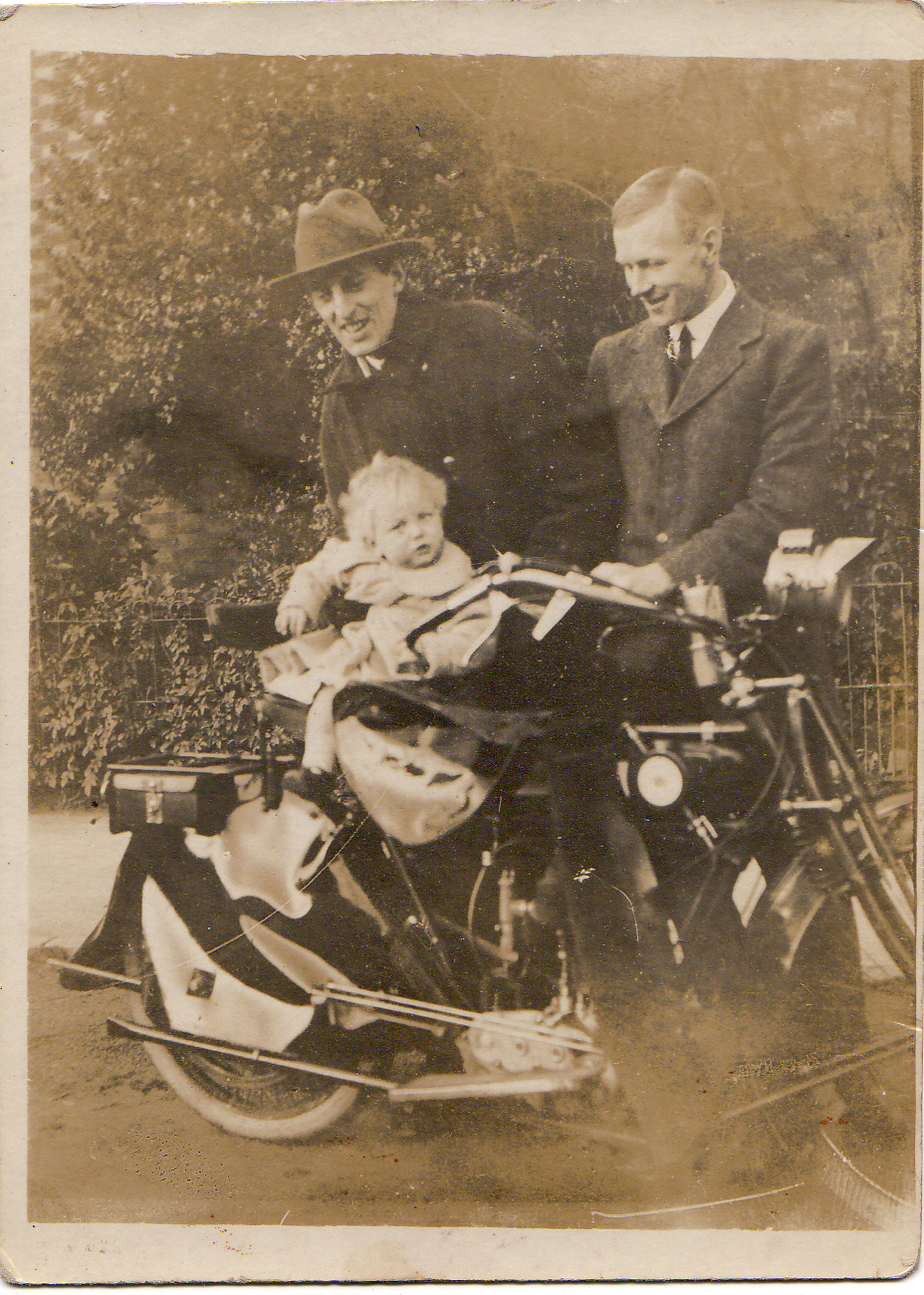
Photograph of Hugh Pembroke Vowles (1885–1951) with son (child on motorbike) Francis Hugh Vowles LLB (1911–1990)

He had two sons by his first marriage:

- Francis Hugh Vowles (born Rugby 18 September 1911 died Gloucester 2 May 1990)
- Christopher David Vowles (born Gloucester March 1916) completed articles in Gloucester.

In 1935, HP Vowles met Eleanor Biss, who became his second wife. They had no children. She later lived in Stonehouse in a cottage named "Elscot".

== Political ideas ==
He recognised that there would be increased competition for resources and markets as productivity rose and that this would impact upon people's lives both by taking resources away from good causes, such as health and the advancement of science and by the effects of war:

In "post-war conditions of politics and trade... trade ... must find a vent in export for the huge increase of capacity in the productive machinery of this and other countries, leading to fiercer and fiercer competition for foreign markets and for 'control' of the raw material producing regions – particularly coal and oil areas – and so to another large scale war beside which the last will pale into insignificance, a war possibly with America, as part of the price I have to pay for the goods I buy under the present system. Many other items I have also entered up which do not commonly figure in a manufacturer's cost accounts, although they must inevitably be paid for all the same-neglect of science, neglect of health, neglect indeed of all that might to-day make life fair and gracious, simply because industry is run from the point of view of 'frenzied finance' and not for the service of mankind. . . . ." The Price We Pay

He felt that in the 1920s political change was around the corner, in particular to the left: "Nevertheless, in spite of all my doubts there are times when I am upon the whole more hopeful of the world ridding itself of its innumerable burdens; when I see signs of more and yet more fires being kindled in the minds of men; smouldering as yet, but soon it may be to blaze up and spread the knowledge that a time of great change is at hand."

He recognised the danger posed by Hitler to Eastern Europe at the end of the 1930s. In "Ukraine and its People" (1939), he wrote "There is good reason to believe that Herr Hitler proposes to make use of (Ukrainian minority movements) to serve his own ambitions. The nature of these ambitions, which include the annexation of Soviet Ukraine, is indicated in Mein Kampf".

== Religious ideas ==
Hugh Pembroke Vowles at the Oxlynch

His religious ideas are particularly interesting given that he was the son of a Wesleyan Minister and became a communist in an era when socialism was popular amongst western intellectuals.

He discussed Christianity in the context of socialism in his article entitled "Tradition in the Great State" in the book Socialism and the Great State edited by H. G. Wells and published in 1912. This book outlined how a state run along ideal socialist lines would be like. He stated the following: "Many of the needs of men are long-lived, and it is an open question whether most if not all of our present-day traditions will not go on to a fuller and completer influence in the lives of the citizens of the Great State. That large body of tradition we speak of as Christianity, for example, may conceivably serve as the basis of the moral tradition in the Great State. This matter is, I believe, to be discussed more fully in another paper in this book, but the present writer now ventures to offer a few remarks that seem to fall within his scope. In many ways he admits Christian tradition has been a beneficial factor in our evolution. Its teaching of love and concord is of the very essence of the Great State. Whatever broadens the basis of sympathy and mutual understanding is a force operating in the constructive direction, and so it would seem probable that Christianity will at least survive in its spirit and intermingle with the more elaborate traditions of the future. In no case can a tradition disappear without leaving behind it some effect or influence. But this is far from asserting that there need be or will be a definite survival of Christianity as such. Contemporary Christianity must purge itself from a multitude of defects before it can possibly be acceptable to the clear-headed men who will be the normal citizens of the Great State. A mere spirit of co-operation alone can never be all sufficing for the religious basis of tradition. The Great State will be complex beyond all precedent and that he may cope successfully with these complexities the average citizen must be trained to think clearly and exhaustively, and be given a wealth of tradition for his guidance multifarious beyond any the world has yet produced. Christianity as we know it at present makes no insistence upon understanding and mental alertness as duties, nor upon the supreme necessity of thoroughness in thought and work. It is not a critical religion; it is emotionally sound, perhaps, but critically careless, and the vital preservative of right in a complex situation is a critical faculty highly stimulated and fed."

== Collaboration with others ==
Vowles collaborated with H. G. Wells and Professor Sir E.Ray Lankester.

He was a close friend of Hubert Cecil Booth, inventor of the vacuum cleaner. Booth married Margaret Vowles' sister.

== Publications ==
=== Books ===
- Under new management: a book for business men and others (published in 1922 by Allen & Unwin, London)
- The Web of Finance (published by John Bellows of Gloucester in 1926)
- The Quest for Power (Chapman and Hall, London, 1931 book published with Margaret W. Vowles, his first wife)
- Ukraine and its People (W. and R Chambers, London, 1939)
- James Watt and the Industrial Revolution (with Henry Winram Dickinson); published in 1943, new edition 1948 and reprinted in 1949. Also published in Spanish and Portuguese (1944) by the British Council)

=== Scholarly articles ===
- The Tradition of the Great State. Chapter in "Socialism and the Great State, Essays in Construction", by H. G. Wells et al., Harper and Brothers Publishers, New York (1912).
- The Price We Pay. The New Age: A Socialist Review of Religion, Science, and Art. No. 1503 Edition Vol 29, No.9 (1921)
- Essence of The Matter The New Age: A Socialist Review of Religion, Science, and Art. No. 1521 Vol 30, No 1 (1921)
- A Reply to Mr Lethaby. The Hibbert Journal: A Quarterly Review of Religion, Theology, and Philosophy (Jan. 1929)
- Engineer as Ruler (1930)
- Joseph's Well. Correspondence published in Mechanical Engineering (Monthly Journal of the American Society of Mechanical Engineers), February 1930, page 163. Includes details of Le Demour's 1732 pump.
- "An Enquiry into Origins of the Windmill". Transactions of the Newcomen Society. 11. 1930–1931.
- Ancient Windmills, letter to Nature, 22 February 1932, page 317
- Early Evolution of Power Engineering Isis, Vol. 17, No. 2 (1932), pp. 412–420
- Science and Industrial Insanity. Article published with Margaret Vowles. July 1932.
- Electrification in the USS.R. in Science & Technology in the Soviet Union. Articles based on papers read at the Symposium at Easter, 1942, held under the auspices of The Faculty of Science of Marx House, 1, Doughty Street, London.
- British Association for the Advancement of Science, Report. Vol. II, No. 5. Science and World Order. Transactions of a Conference of the Division for the Social and International Relations of Science. British Association. 5s. net. On page 52 Vowles, speaking of the advance of mechanical science in Russia, said: "Most large Soviet cities have their pipe networks conveying hot water or steam to domestic, municipal and industrial consumers."

=== Children's stories ===
- "Freaks of the Road" Boys' Own Paper, July 1932. A story.

=== Newspaper articles ===
Vowles published regularly in the South Wales News in the 1920s and 1930s.

- The Crook is beating the Scientist. The Daily Mail, Wednesday, 27 April 1932.
- Article about Hubert Cecil Booth, published c1951 in the Gloucester citizen under the title "an interested reader"
