= Margaret Pierce =

Margaret or Maggie Pierce may refer to:

- Margaret Pierce, musician in The Pierces
- Margaret Pierce, see List of Brigham Young's wives
- Margaret Anne Pierce, see Computer ethics
- Maggie Pierce, fictional character in Grey's Anatomy
- Maggie Pierce (actress) (1931–2010), American actress in My Mother the Car and The Fastest Guitar Alive
- Maggie Pierce (soccer) (born 2001), American soccer player

== See also ==
- Margaret Pearce (1882–1932), English author on science
- Margaret Pearse (disambiguation)
