= Henry Allen (mayor of Gloucester) =

Mayor of Gloucester, England 1873-Unknown

Henry Allen (1815 – 21 October 1893), was an English businessman and politician.

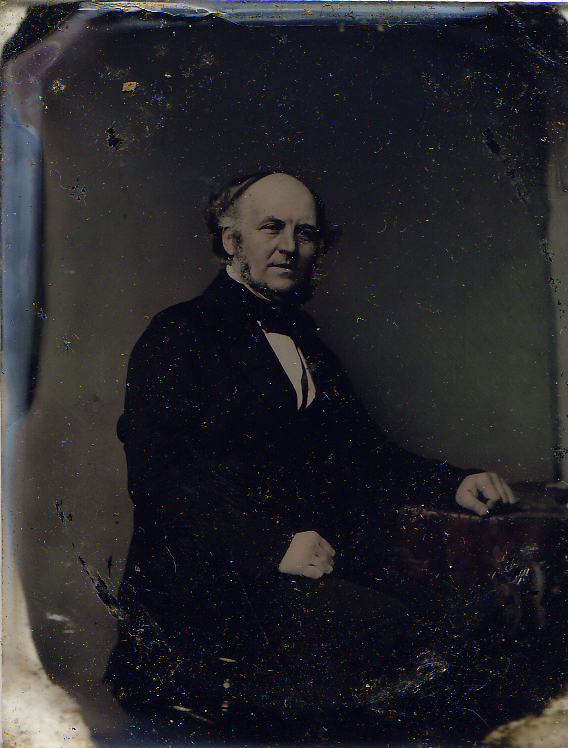
Henry Allen, Mayor of Gloucester, England

Born in Upton, Hampshire in 1815, Henry Allen came to Gloucester from Stroud with the late Alderman Joseph Reynolds in 1860, to begin operating the City Flour Mills. The Gloucester City Flour Mills had been operated by Joseph and Jonah Hadley since 1850. Henry Allen and Joseph Reynolds passed on the business in 1875 to their sons, John Allen and Vincent Reynolds, in partnership with Francis Tring Pearce. Henry Allen retired from the mills in about 1878 and the firm later became Priday, Metford and Company Limited. His daughter Martha Allen married Francis Tring Pearce, thus affirming the family nature of the business.

Henry Allen represented the West Ward on the Gloucester City Council for the Liberals and was elected mayor in 1873. He was the last Chief Magistrate of Gloucester before the important extension of the city boundaries. He was a prominent member of the Wesleyan Connexion, a trustee of the Northgate Wesleyan Chapel and one of the chief promoters and subscribers to the erection of the new chapel in Northgate street. He was a steadfast supporter of the Temperance movement and was a justice of the peace for many years.

He lived his last days with his daughter and son in law at Lorraine House, Gloucester. His brother Reverend William Allen conducted his funeral service.

Henry Allen married three times. His third wife was Mary Ann Charlotte Richardson (1845–1872). Mary Ann was the daughter of John Richardson (died 1846), who was the son of John Richardson (died 1788) and Elizabeth Pitt, who was the daughter of Dr Charles Pitt.

He lived at Elm Villa, London Road, Gloucester and around the time of his death at Lorraine House, Gloucester.

Their granddaughters included Margaret Winifred Pearce.

== The old customs house ==
Henry Allen owned a number of notable properties around the city of Gloucester. He lived with his family in the Old customs house.

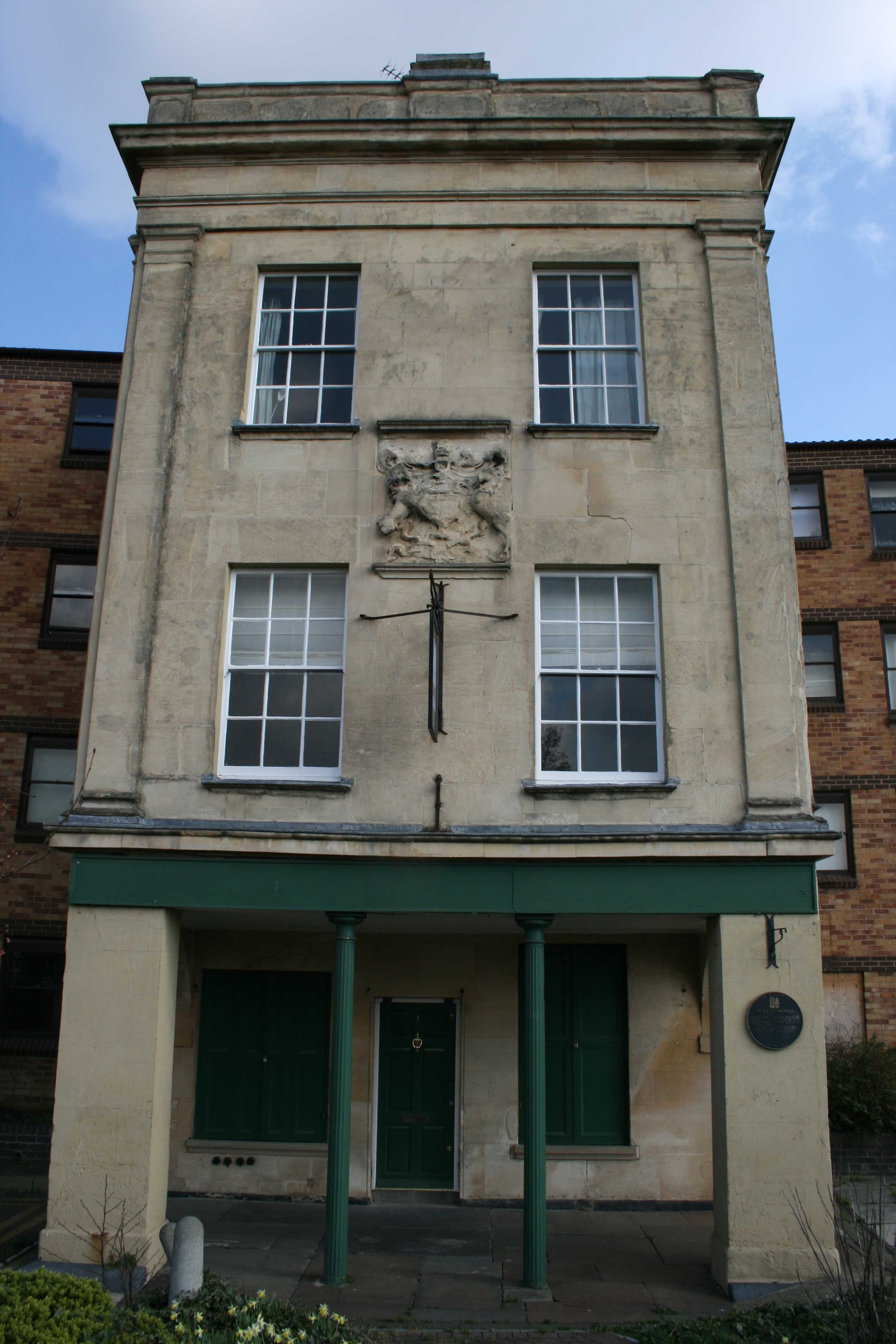
The old customs house, Gloucester, England. Previously owned by Henry Allen and lived in by his family

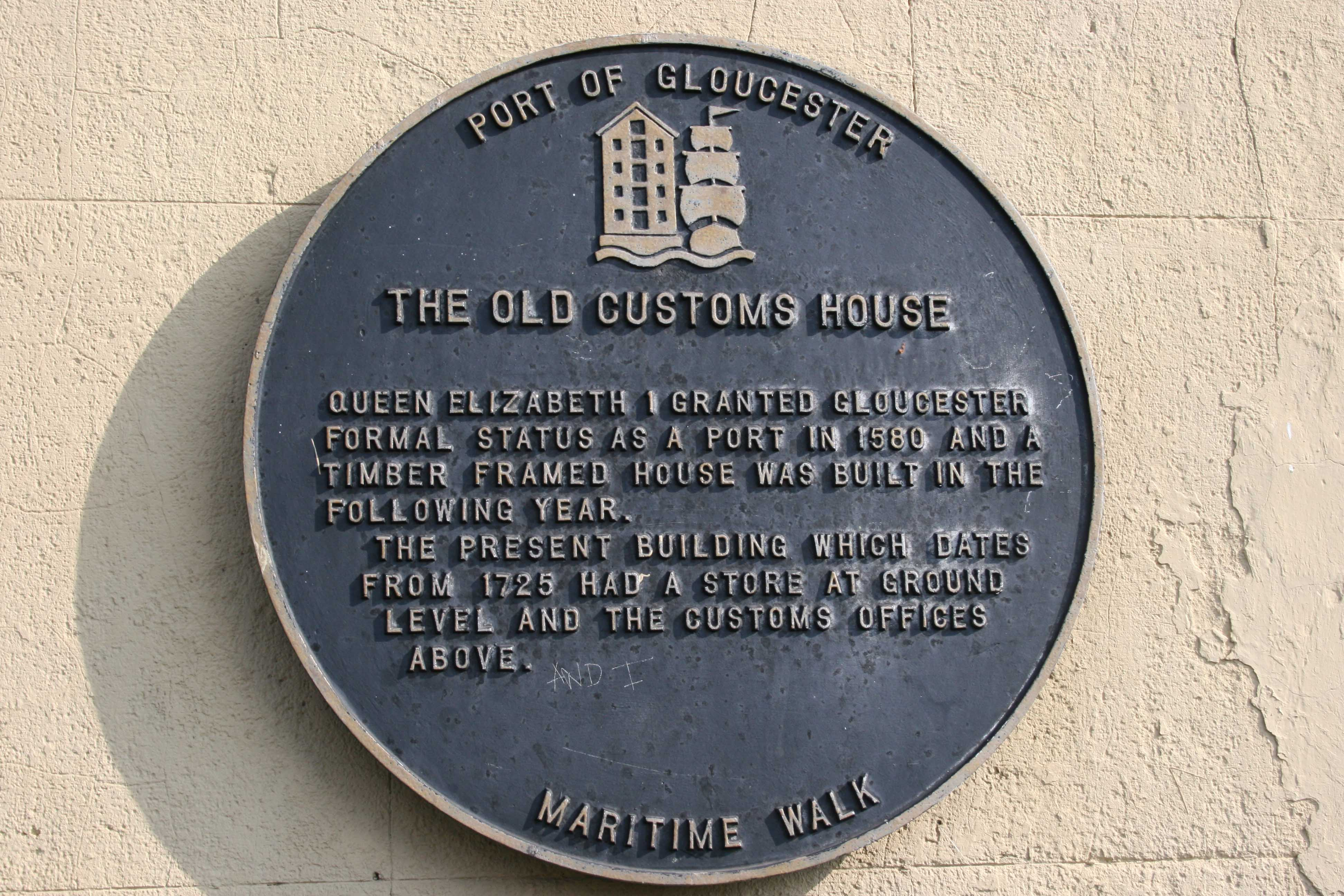
The old customs house, Gloucester, England. Previously owned by Henry Allen and lived in by his family

== The Roundhouse ==
In December 1988 The Citizen newspaper in Gloucester included a reference to Henry Allen. This was included in its "200 Years Ago" section. This states "200 Years Ago: TO LET. The Roundhouse is at length quite free by introduction of a splendid new quay on the side of the noble river Severn, which will, now that the quay is completed, offer some first rate navigation. Apply Henry Allen, Quay, Gloucester"

== Lorraine House ==
Lorraine House at 45 Park Road, Gloucester, was owned and lived in by Henry Allen's daughter Martha Pearce and her husband Francis Tring Pearce.

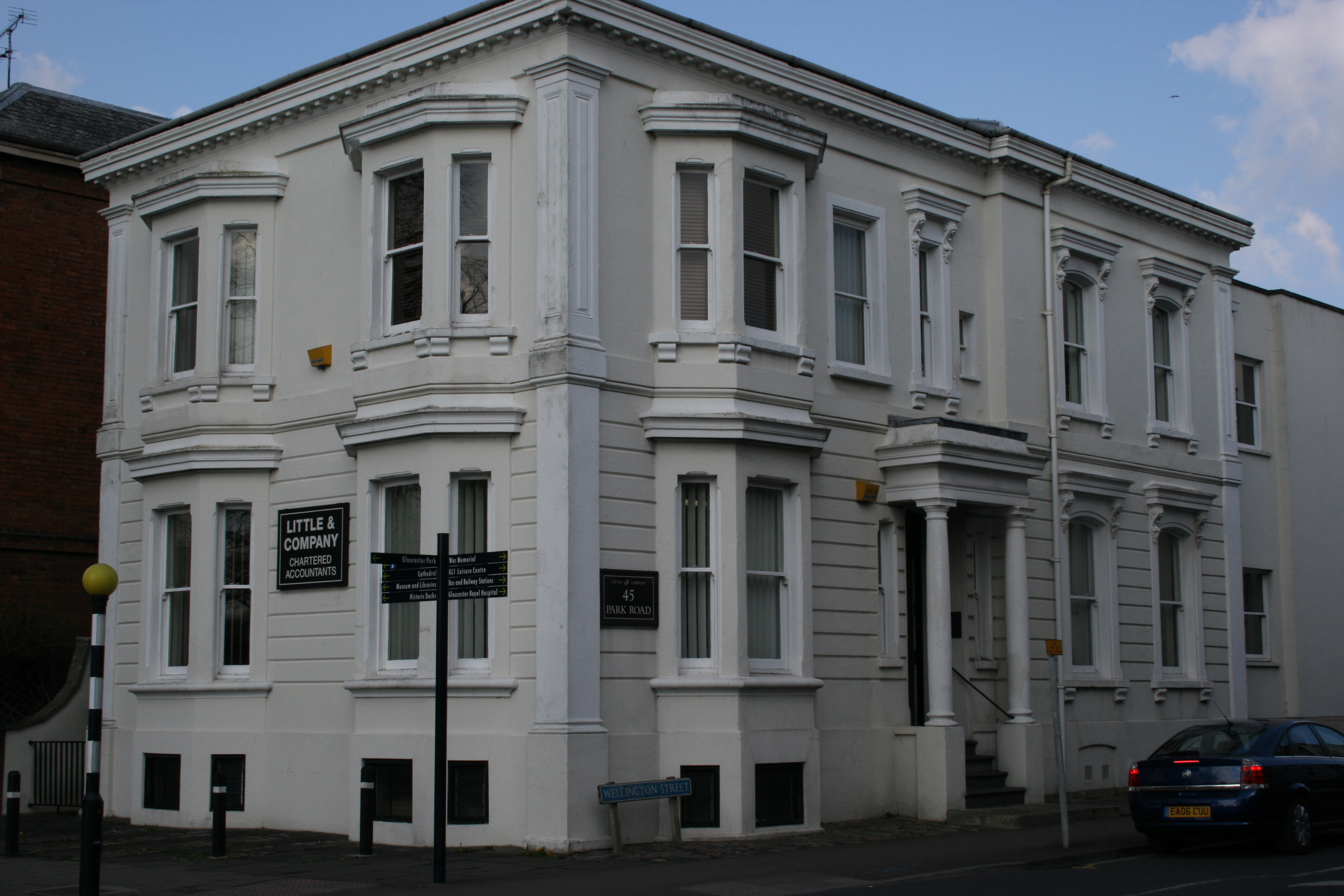
Lorraine House at 45 Park Road, Gloucester in 2009. Associated with Priday Metford Ltd
