= Newcomen Society =

British society promoting engineering history

Coordinates: 51°29′51″N 0°10′29″W

The Newcomen Society
- Logo of the Newcomen Society
- Named after: Thomas Newcomen
- Formation: 1920
- Type: Learned society
- Purpose: Promotion and study of the history of engineering and technology
- Headquarters: The Science Museum
- Location: London
- Official language: English
- Website: http://newcomen.com/

The Newcomen Society is an international learned society that promotes and celebrates the history of engineering and technology. It was founded in London in 1920, and takes its name from Thomas Newcomen, one of the inventors associated with the early development of the steam engine and who is widely considered the "father of the Industrial Revolution". An early president was Loughnan St. L. Pendred.

The society is concerned with all branches of engineering: civil, mechanical, electrical, electronic, structural, aeronautical, marine, chemical and manufacturing as well as biography and invention.

The Newcomen Society is based at the Science Museum in London. There are regional branches in England: Midlands (Birmingham), North West (Manchester), North East (Newcastle), Western (Bristol) and Southern (Portsmouth), South Yorkshire (Sheffield) and one in Scotland (Glasgow and Edinburgh).

It publishes the International Journal for the History of Engineering and Technology (formerly the Transactions of the Newcomen Society) and Newcomen Links, a quarterly newsletter. An online archive of previous Transactions is available to members. The society also has a YouTube Channel with videos of meetings, conferences and online lectures.

The motto of the Society is the Latin actorum memores simul affectamus agenda, meaning "mindful of things that have taken place, at the same time we strive after things yet to be done". The choice of a griffin regardant for the logo was to symbolise vigilance and looking backward while going forward.

The Newcomen Society is a registered charity and a limited company.

An American branch was established in 1923, but the Newcomen Society of the United States was entirely separate from its UK counterpart. The American group disbanded in 2007.

== Notable members ==
- Henry Winram Dickinson (1870–1952) (co-founder, president 1932–34, editor of Transactions)
- L. T. C. Rolt
- Alec Skempton
- Hugh Pembroke Vowles
- Rex Wailes
- Paul Wilson, Baron Wilson of High Wray (president, 1973–1975)
