= Priday, Metford and Company Limited =

Priday, Metford and Company Limited was a family-run company that produced flour at the City Flour Mills, Gloucester, England for over a century. They were closed down in 1994 and the premises were converted to luxury apartments under the name of "Priday's Mill". The City Flour Mills was the location of the landmark case in contract law known as Hadley v. Baxendale.

== Foundation of the Gloucester City Flour Mills and lawsuit ==
Plaque on Priday's Mill, Gloucester

The City Flour Mills was built in 1850 by Joseph and Jonah Hadley who used the mill until 1860 when they moved their business to London. During their time, the building was the site of a landmark case in contract law referred to as Hadley v. Baxendale.

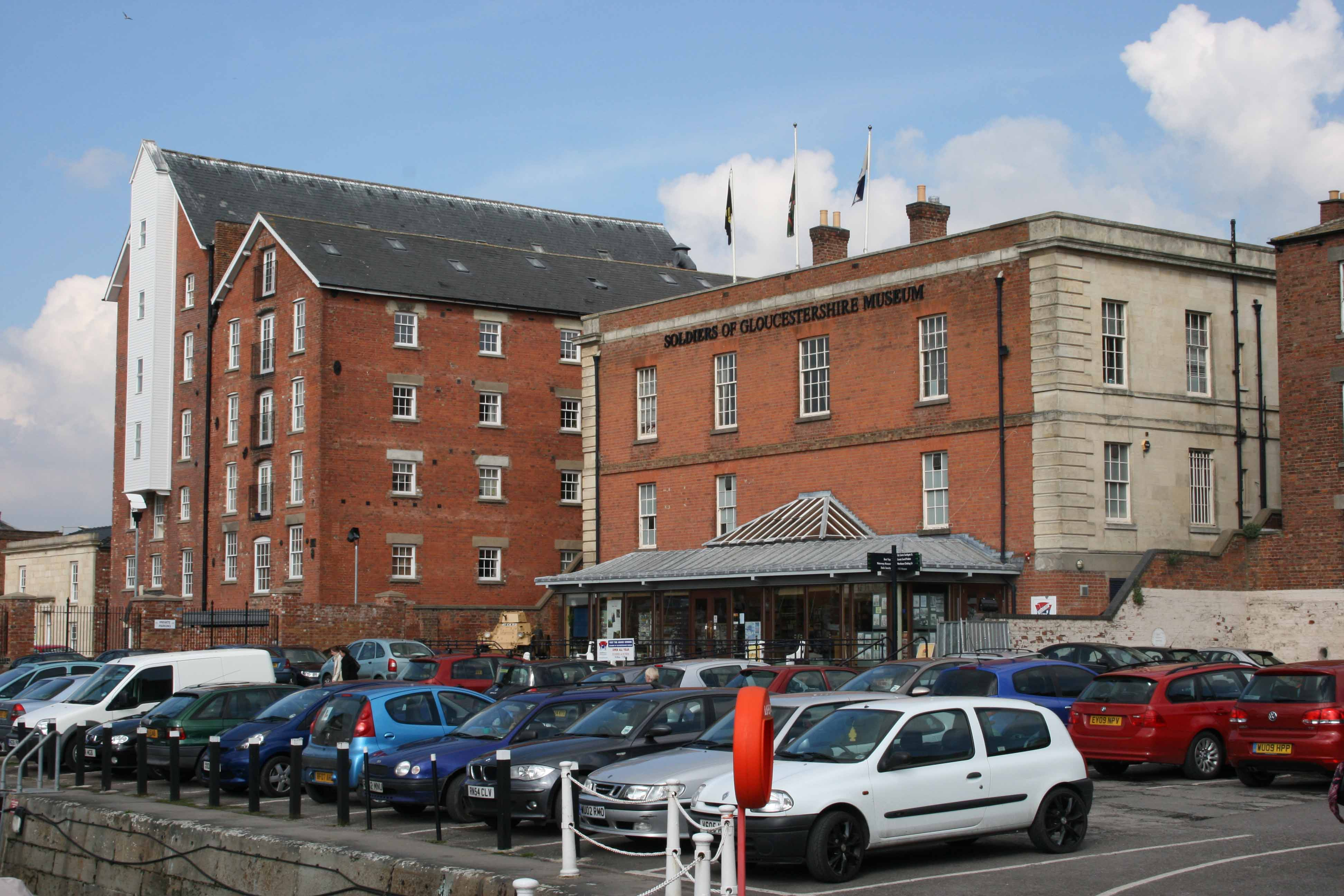
"Priday's Mill" the former city flour mills and premises of Priday Metford and Co. at Gloucester Docks. The building in the foreground is the new customs house, currently the Soldiers of Gloucestershire museum

== Reynolds and Allen ==
Joseph Reynolds and Henry Allen (both of whom became Mayors of Gloucester) took over the mill, passing on their business in 1875 to their sons, Vincent Reynolds and John Allen, in partnership with Francis Tring Pearce.

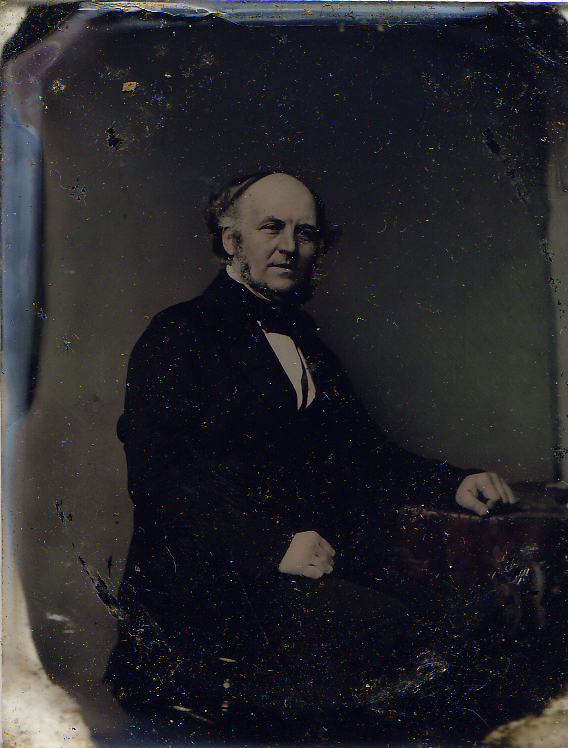
Henry Allen, Mayor of Gloucester, England

== Priday, Metford and Company ==
This business ran into difficulties in 1885 largely owing to the cost of conversion from stone grinding to steel roller-milling, in accordance with contemporary trends, and to the vagaries of wheat prices.

The partners entered into a scheme of arrangement whereby Priday, Metford & Co. took over the business as a going concern.

Charles Priday (already milling at Over and at St. Owen's Mill at the Gloucester Docks), Francis Killigrew Seymour Metford, who had trained as a miller in Bristol and Francis Tring Peace formed the partnership of Priday, Metford & Co., took over the mill and pulled it into profitability. The original documents show that the partnership commenced on 25 March 1886, although the accounts opened on 15 March and the partnership deed was signed on 24 May 1886.

The business was incorporated on 19 September 1900 under the name of Priday, Metford and Company Limited.

There were nine original shareholders (see Later), Priday was elected chairman, with Pearce and Metford being appointed directors.

== The buildings ==
The City Flour Mills originally consisted of one mill building and an office, situated at the Gloucester Docks, close to the Victoria Dock and backing on to Commercial Road. A second building, then known as the New Wheatside but more recently as the Middle Building, was erected around 1854 and contained wheat cleaning equipment. However, in 1888, it was destroyed in a dramatic fire which was reported in the "Gloucestershire Chronicle" and "Gloucester Journal" of 7 January 1888. The fire was spectacular; flames were blown across Commercial Road and sparks reached Bearland. Firemen worked for two days to cool the ruins. Fortunately the premises were insured and they were rebuilt, with new machinery and an automatic sprinkler system. The rooftop water tank which fed this system was a landmark until its removal in 1983.

When the fire was discovered, the alarm was raised by ringing a ship's bell on the North Warehouse. Also known as the Atlas Bell, it has been used as a navigation aid at Shepperdine in the Severn estuary since the 1940s. It is now in the course of being returned by the Gloucester Civic Trust to its original place on the North Warehouse to complement the present renovation of the building by the Gloucester City Council.

Until 1921 the company also milled at St. Owen's Mill, where it produced its stoneground Digestive Wheat Meal and animal feeds until the plant was moved to the North Warehouse. The company made its Hercules brown flour at the North Warehouse which was also used to store and pack flour until the early 1960s when Priday, Metford moved these operations to the Victoria Warehouse.

The main frontage of the Mill has scarcely changed since it was built and is easily recognised in early photographs. However, there have been many alterations, including the removal of the chimney in 1921, the addition of the water tank and, in 1925, the construction of the extraction tower and gantry which carried grain from barges in the Victoria Dock until the 1970s and which still conveys flour to the Victoria Warehouse. The concrete wheat silos were constructed in 1964 and stand where once there were stables for Priday, Metford's heavy horses.

The City Flour Mills are probably the last remaining building at the Gloucester Docks which is still used for the purpose for which it was originally built.

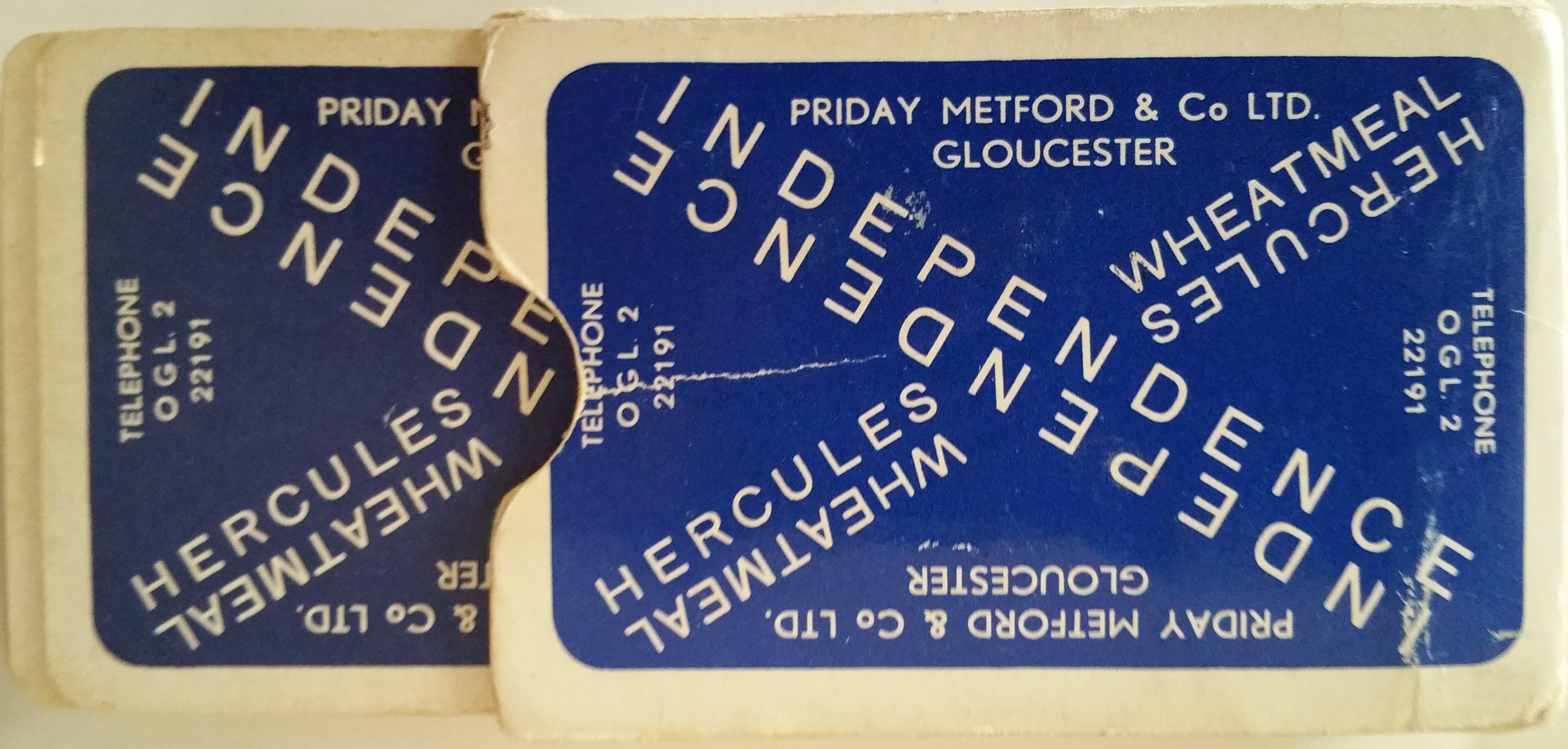
Playing Cards used as publicity for Priday Metford Millers of Gloucester, England

== Milling machinery ==
The mill originally consisted of several sets of grinding stones and some wheat cleaning machinery but, with the movement of the industry towards roller milling and the need to maintain competitiveness, steel roller mills were installed in 1883 by Vincent Reynolds and John Allen. There have been numerous remodels of the mill since then, replacing and updating the plant. Originally, the machinery was driven by two 120 hp (90 kW) steam engines until the Mill was converted to electricity in 1921. In 1935 the transition from DC to AC current was made available. A number of articles describe the Mill between the years 1910–1937.

== Wheat and flour ==
The company's records show that in the 19th Century it brought wheat from France, Poland, Argentina, Chile, Australia, Russia, India and Canada bearing names such as Chirka, California, La Plata, Manitoba. By contrast, in the 1980s only English and Canadian wheat was milled.

The flour, produced in various grades, used to have names such as Leathertie, Bluetie, Extras, Whites and Imperials. A brown flour is still made under the long-standing name of Hercules.

The Company nowadays produces a range of both white and brown flours for supply to the independent baker and every effort is made to meet changes in public demand, the most recent being for additive-free products. Bran, wheat-germ and wheatfeed, which are milling by-products, also sold, the last for incorporation in animal feeds.

== Transport ==
From the early 19th Century the wheat was brought by railway to the Gloucester Docks or by ship to Avonsmouth and Sharpness and thence by barge to Gloucester via the River Severn and the Gloucester and Berkeley Canal.

Until the 1970s the Company used barges, some of which it owned through a subsidiary, Fox Elms Ltd. Two of these barges were lost in the River Severn, namely, the "Fox Elms" which sank in November 1949 after hitting the Severn Railway Bridge in fog and, in 1952, the "Higre" was beached at Lydney. One of these barges is reputed still to be visible at very low tides. The last vessel to be used by the company was the "Nancy H". Her final journey to collect wheat from Avonsmouth is described by John Hopper in "Cotswold Life" for November 1975. From the mid '70s the remaining three barges were kept at Victoria Dock and used to store grain until they were sold in 1983.

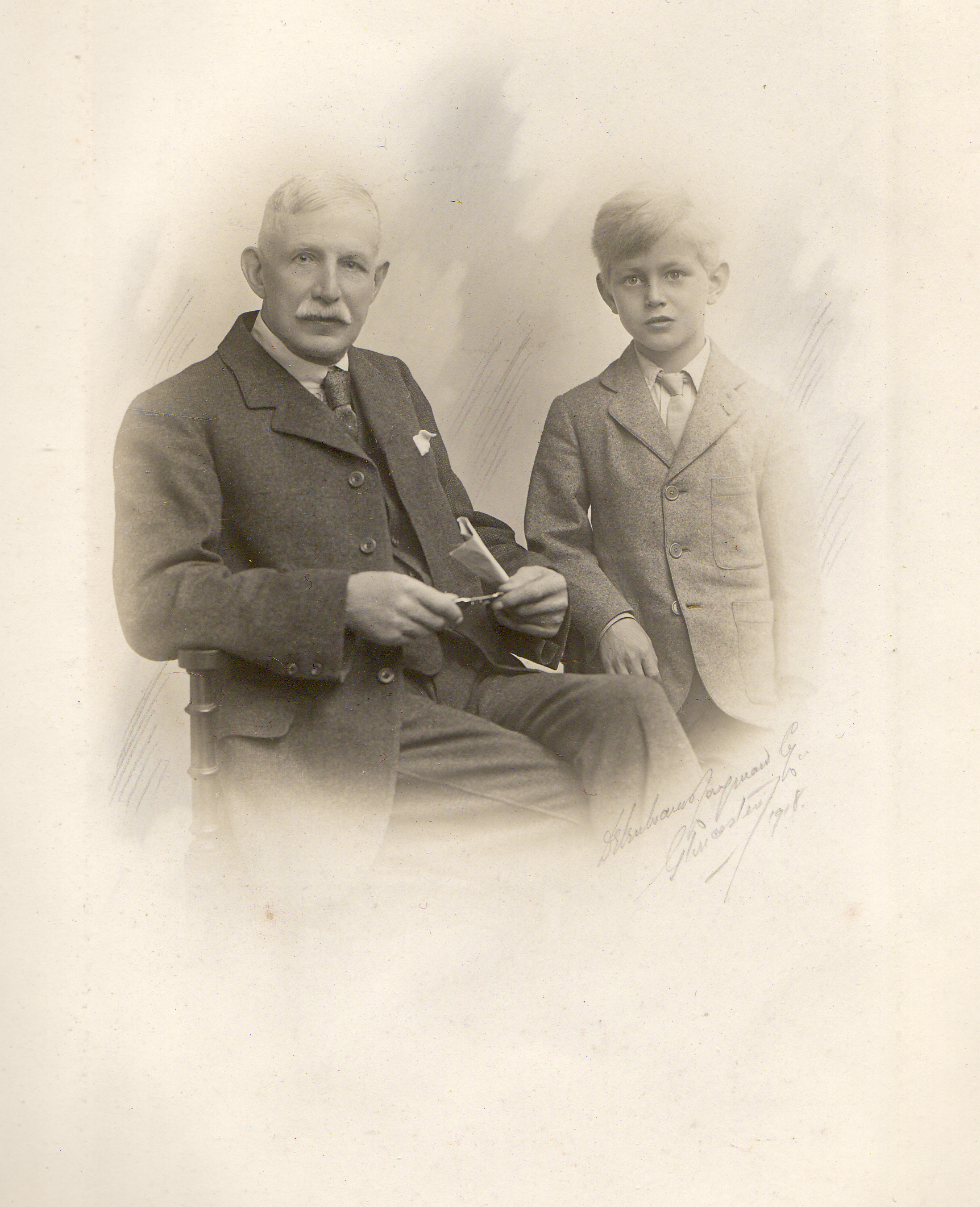
Francis Tring Pearce (16/3/1846 - 19/5/35) and his grandson Francis Hugh Vowles (1911-1990) of Priday Metford Ltd, Gloucester England

The wheat arriving by water was unloaded at the Victoria Dock into railway trucks and pulled horses along a siding to the Mill. In 1925 this system was replaced by a suction intake tower and gantry constructed to draw the wheat from the barge and carry it across the road to the Mill.

The flour was originally distributed in 280 lb (127 kg) sacks piled high on horse-drawn drays. Later these were replaced by motor vehicles; a steam-driven "Sentinel" and, later, by Dennis lorries, the early models having solid tyres. Railways were also used for flour delivery. The company built up a fleet of flatbed lorries and bulk tankers to adapt to the transition from rail to road transport.

Before World War I the company had its own horses which were stabled at the mill. The records show that there were normally six heavy horses which were used to pull the drays. They were brought from S. Harvey of Hartpury and tended by George Hotham, the Gloucester veterinary surgeon who practice was at Bearland. A small "Horse Book" records the names and the details of the horses kept in the years 1907–1917. These horses suffered a number of ailments. For example, Prince had to be put down when he was 17 years old because he seedy foot. Millers' horses were susceptible to a number of problems due to heavy work on hard surfaces, including bone diseases caused by feeding the horses with too much bran which, as a by-product of flour milling, was consequently cheap and readily available.

Several pictures of Priday, Metford's early transport have survived together those of bakers' carrying the company's advertisement.

== Management and staff ==
Priday, Metford & Co. was founded by Charles Priday, who was already milling at Over and at St. Owen's Mill in the Docks, Mr (later Col. Sir) Francis Killigrew Seymour Metford and Mr Francis Tring Pearce who had been a partner in the firm of Reynolds and Allen. Messrs Priday and Pearce retired in 1922 and in 1946 Sir Francis (knighted in 1938) retired after 60 years with the business. His knighthood was celebrated with a party at the Connaught Rooms, later the Cadena in Eastgate Street, and gifts, silver cigarette cases or workbaskets, for employees. A signed photograph was produced in 1936 to mark his jubilee of service to the company.

The mill was run by descendants of the three founders until the death of Mr John Priday (a grandson of Charles Priday) in 1980. Two of the families are still represented on the board of Directors by direct descendants of the founders, although the day-to-day management is the responsibility of full-time executives.

When the business was incorporated in 1900 the original shareholders were Charles and Florence Priday, Frances and Agnes Metford and Francis and Martha Pearce together with Henry Allen Pearce (their son) and Henry Witcomb Arkell, the mill foreman and nephew of Charles Priday.

The company has remained in the hands of the three families and shares are held by relatives of the original partners to the fourth generation in the case of the Pridays and Metfords. Other shareholders are descended from Henry Arkell. The Pearce family have been connected with the City Flour Mills since 1860 and for six generations because Henry Allen (co founder of Reynold and Allen) was the father in law of Francis Tring Pearce and his great-great granddaughter Margaret Elizabeth Cooper was appointed a director of Priday Metford and Company in 1984.

Priday, Metford & Co Ltd has been very much a "family" company particularly in that many of its employees have given extensive service, some for 50 years or more in the past. In a number of cases, several members of the same family worked at the mill and for two or three generations. The "Citizen" has, before now, carried articles on the long service of Priday Metford employees.

In 1956 inscribed watches were presented to those who had completed 25 years employment with Priday, Metford. Some of those watches are proudly used by their owners today. The company has a number of pensioners in recognition of their long service with the company, many having recollections of the mill going back to the 1920s.

== The 1986 centenary ==
The company has marked the year by producing calendars and ceramic mugs with special designs recording its centenary.

The Ropert Opie Collection, in conjunction with the company, presented an exhibition of the company's early records and advertising material during June and July 1986 at the Pack-Age Museum at the docks.

A dinner-dance for employees and pensioners was held at the Golden Valley Hotel in June 1986 and at the company's Annual General Meeting in July shareholders joined the Board of Directors at a Centenary Lunch at the Parliament Room in the Cathedral Close, Gloucester.

== Key dates in the history of Priday Metford and Company ==
1850 City Flour Mills built for Joseph & Jonah Hadley, millers. Brick building. Stonegrinding and flour-dressing machines, steam powered. Part of progress from water to steam power and change of mill sites to docksides.

1854 (Probable date). Middle building added. Two new steam engines and wheat cleaning machinery installed. Capacity doubled.

1860 J.& J. Hadley moved to City Flour Mills, London. Gloucester Mill taken over by Joseph Reynolds and Henry Allen.

1867 St. Owen's Mill started; used by Priday, Metford & Co 1888 (?) to 1921.

1875 J. Reynolds and H. Allen retired. Succeeded by sons, Vincent Reynolds and John Allen. Francis Tring Pearce also a partner.

1877 A barometer inscribed "City Flour Mills June 1887" presented to Henry Rowles.

1879 Charles Priday took over St. Owen's Mill.

1883 New 10-sack steel roller mill installed (1 sack = 280 lb = 5 bushels = 127 kg)

1885 December: Reynolds & Allen's business in difficulty. Possible causes: costof conversion of Mill, fluctuation in wheat prices, shortage of capital, additional cost of delivery Avonmouth to Gloucester, difficult canal.

1886 Partnership formed by Charles Priday, Francis Killigrew Seymour Metford and Francis Tring Pearce, under the name of Priday Metford & Co. Accounts started 15 March. Partnership commenced 25 March (deed dated 24 May). New procedures instituted and business grew quickly.

1888 4 January: Fire in Middle Building (also called New Wheatside). £9000 damage. Rebuilding included new bulk storage silos for wheat, wheat separating and cleaning systems and automatic sprinkler system with reserve water tank on top of roof: latter removed in 1983. During repairs wheat was cleaned at St. Owen's mill.

1892 National Association of British and Irish Millers (nabim) Convention held at Gloucester.

1900 19 September. Business incorporated under title of Priday, Metford and Company Limited. C. Priday first Chairman; F.T. Pearce and FKS Metford directors. 10 October: first directors' meeting. Founder shareholders: the directors, M.W. Arkell, Florence Priday, Ages Metford, Martha Pearce, Henry Allen Pearce

1904 Description of Mill - modern, clean, Digestive Wheat Meal made at St Owen's Mill. H.W. Arkell, Mill Foreman (Industrial Gloucestershire, 1904).

1907 Horse Book - records of horses kept 1907 -1916; purchase, sale, ailments.

1910 5 November: article on Priday, Metford describes mill process and buildings. Mill manager Mr Rushworth. "Gloucester Chronicle" also mentions that "Hercules" (stoneground) wheatmeal flour and barley meal was produced by the Company at North Mill. This mill was powered by electricity. Test bakery for Mills.

1921 Mill remodelled; converted from steam (2 Lancashire Beam engines) to electricity. Company ceased to make wheatmeal flour at St Owen's Mill; transferred process to North Mill.

1922 F.T. Pearce and C Priday retired. New directors H A Pearce and Arthur Kenneth Priday. New Chairman F.K.S. Metford.

1925 (probable date): Suction intake and gantry constructed to carry wheat from barges in Victoria Dock to mill.

1927 F.K.S. Metford President of NABIM for the "Strawberry Convention" at Cheddar.

1931 Death of H.A. Pearce. New director Francis Thomas Pearce.

1935 Death of F.T Pearce senior. (or possibly 1931). Mill changed from DC to AC electricity. 20 March: Fox Elms Ltd incorporated; "Turog" dumbbarge purchased. Company secretary John Forrester Raikes Bevan

1936 F.T. Pearce junior retired. New director Richard Anthony Pearce. Company celebrated F.K.S. Metford's 50 years with company, special printed card with photo.

1936 F.K.S. Metford knighted; address by board at AGM recorded; presentation, staff party and gifts.

1944 AGM minutes recorded 2 staff and 9 mill employees had been in forces; 2 killed in action.

1946 F.K.S. Metford retired. New Chairman A.K. Priday; New director, Francis Owen Metford

1947 33 Park road purchased as accommodation for employees who had no housing. First occupiers: H.Austin, O. Ellis, G. Elliott

1949 "Fox Elms" hit Severn Railway Bridge (November) and sank; T. Aldridge, master, and son survived. Potential claim for damage to bridge by Ministry of Transport mentioned in AGM minutes. Account show hire of "Morrison" 1949-51

1950 27 July "Severn Conveyor" purchased.

1952 P.O. Metford retired. New director, Lady Metford. (Probable date) "Higre" lost - hit sandbank.

1953 J.F.R. Bevan retired after 50 years as company secretary. Austen Ivor Harold Coates succeeded him. Lady Metford retired. New director, Mrs Beatrix Amy Howard Wyatt-Smith, later McNaughten.

1956 Bread subsidy withdrawn

1957 Mill modernisation. Flu epidemic caused drop in flour consumption.

1958 Death of Lady Metford.

1959 "Nancy H" motorised barge purchased.

1962 Move from North Mill, due to dock entrance enlargement to Victoria Warehouse. Bulk storage system installed—claimed to be the most modern in Europe. Entroleter milling introduced.

1963 "Severn Trader" motorship purchased by Fox Elms Ltd.

1964 New concrete grain silo completed. Flour packing moved to Victoria warehouse. 19 May: J.F.R. Bevan died "53 years secretary and loyal servant" (AGM minutes).

1965 31 March. A.K. Priday retired after 43 years as director, 29 as chairman. New Chairman R.A.Pearce; new director Charles John Priday. 24 July "Gloucester Journal" picture and article on "Five men's 263 years' service".

1966 Mrs Scott (now Mrs Meadows) (secretary) retired after 44 years' service.

1967 Death of A.K. Priday.

1968 Death of R.A. Pearce. New chairman C.J. Priday; new director Christopher David Vowles. Purchase of 5 new lorries and bulk tanker. New storage bins expected December (AGM minutes).

1969 Mill motor (installed 1935) replaced by several smaller ones. Marriage of William Ellis and Miss Joan Dutton, 72 years' service between them.

1970 Mrs Sally Oppenheim's election as MP for Gloucester recorded in AGM minutes

1971 Company entered pre-mix trade - shortage of skilled labour make it attractive to bakers. Presentation to Normal Bird after 50 years' service.

1973 Britain entered Common Market; Charman records effect not greatly felt due to existing high import levies on wheat. Most of company's wheat delivered by road. 21 July: W. Ellis 50 years' service, party and presentation of Waterford glass.

1974 Mrs Macnaugten retired. New director Steward Partic Macnaughten, her husband. 14 December: A. Coates retired after 46 and a half years' service, party at Easter 1975.

1975 Last voyage of the "Nancy H" described by J. Hooper, "Cotswold Life". Seaforth Grain Terminal, Liverpool in use. Road delivery of wheat increased.

1977 J.Reynolds & Co., Gloucester closed by Allied Mills. Priday Metford only remaining flour mill at Gloucester Docks. H. Conway-Jones attributed this to the shares having remained within the original families (Gloucestershire Historical Studies, 1981)

1980 Death of C.J. Priday. New Chairman C.D. Vowles; New director Christopher Bruton Priday. Death of S.P. Macnaughten. New director appointed from outside the family to represent the Metfords, Julian Cecil Somerville Mills. High speed roller mills installed.

1983 New Chairman J.C.S. Mills; New non-family directors Shaun Coleman Dowling, Paul Clearly (General Manager). Barges sold; water tower removed.

1984 C.D. Vowles retired. New director Mrs Margaret Elizabeth Cooper.

1985 P. Cleary appointed Managing Director

== Other accounts of Priday Metford ==
The flour produced by Priday Metford was renowned for its quality as the following quotation from Cotswold Life (July 1986) shows:

"At my grandmother's funeral in Lancashire not long a go I met a distant cousin for the first time. Knowing where I lived he did not enthuse about the beauty of the Cotswolds but said, "Of course, we never come back from the south without calling at Gloucester to buy flour from Priday Metford...." Diana Alexander

== The shareholding and founding families ==
The founding families were those of Charles Priday, Francis Killigrew Seymour Metford and Francis Tring Pearce. These three families controlled the company for over one hundred years and across many generations.

== The Pearce family ==
The Pearce family were involved in milling in the Gloucester area for over a century and for six generations, that is to say right from 1860 until Priday, Metford and Company Limited was sold onto Spillers in about 1986. The family link with milling in Gloucester goes back to 1860 (and before the inception of Priday Metford) because Director Francis Tring Pearce married Martha Allen, the daughter of Henry Allen and Mary Ann Charlotte Richardson (1845–1872) of Tewkesbury. Henry Allen had been milling in the Gloucester area since 1860 as part of Reynolds and Allen Company. Henry Allen was Mayor of Gloucester in 1872. Mary Ann Charlotte Richardson was the daughter of John Richardson (died 1846) and Elizabeth (?Isobella) Pitt (died 1846). Elizabeth (?Isobella) Pitt was the daughter (?Granddaughter) of Dr Charles Pitt (Tewkesbury Doctor).

Francis Tring Pearce (16/3/1846 - 19/5/35) was the son of Maria Tring (died 19/10/1853) and Thomas Pearce (died 13/1/1895). Thomas Pearce owned a Chemist at 134 Westgate Street, Gloucester from 1841 to 1870. Thomas Pearce was the son of Joseph Pearce (died 7/7/1847 at Birlingham, Worcestershire).

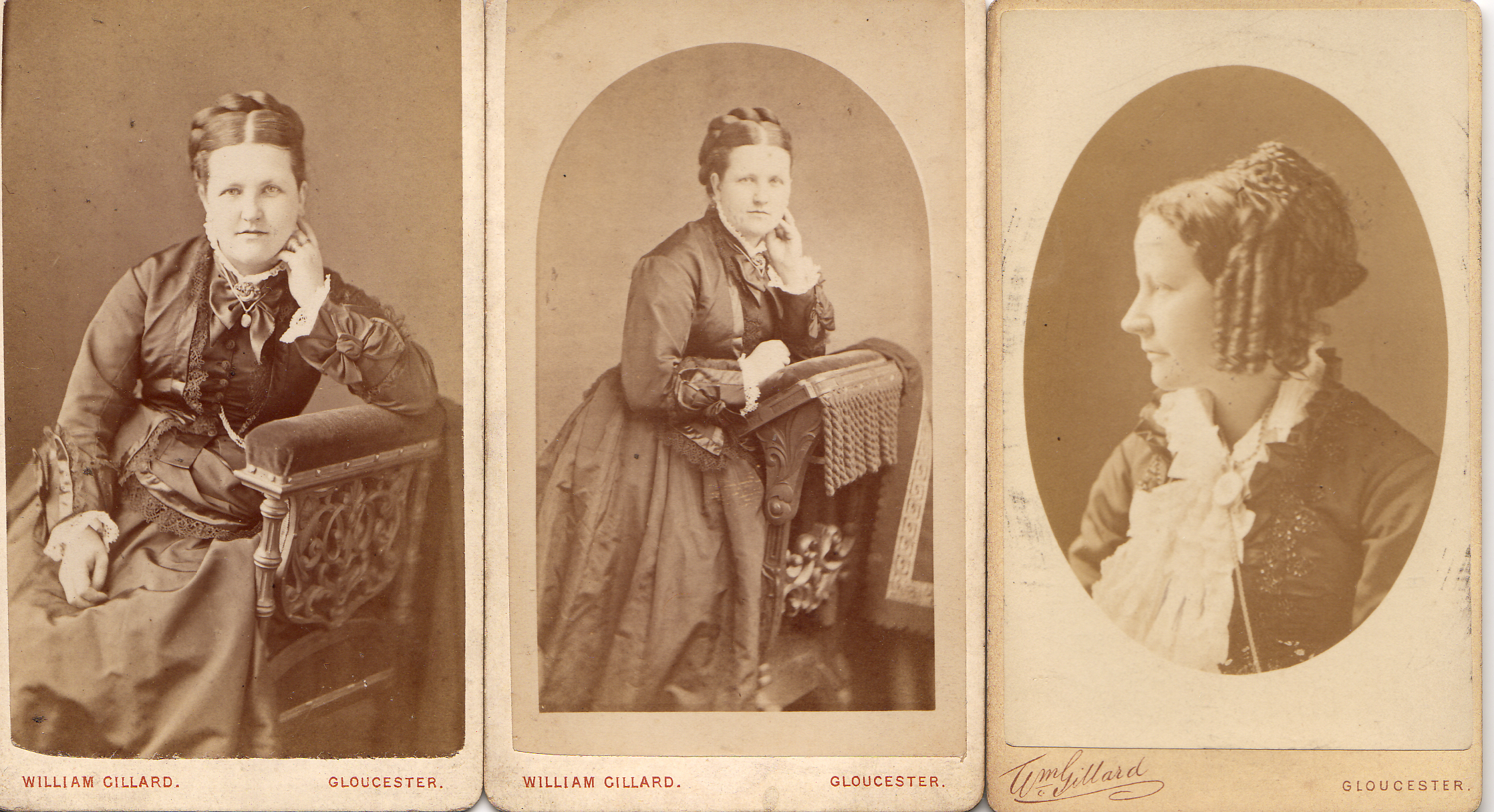
Martha Pearce née Allen 1846-1920 of Priday Metford Ltd, Gloucester

The children of FT Pearce and Martha Allen were:

- Charlotte Mary Pearce (17/7/1872 - 24/10/1948) married Hubert Cecil Booth, inventor of the powered vacuum cleaner
- Henry Allen Pearce (15/10/1873 - 12/11/1931) married Mary Yeoman Harding Vowles (1879–1960) In the 1901 census, Henry Allen Pearce is noted as a miller.
- Francis Thomas Pearce (10/5/1875 - 17/2/1964) married Rose Marianne Parmenter
- Helen Marion Louisa Pearce (18/1/1877 - 7/11/1961) married Dr John Pottinger
- Herbert Elliott Pearce (3/2/1880 - 14/3/1957) was injured with the Royal Flying Corps in the first world war and later owned the "Hobday and co" ironmonger store in Pimlico, on the corner of Moreton and Tachbrook streets. He also published two books on poetry.
- Margaret Winifred Pearce (4/1/1882 - 4/3/1932)
- Edward Oscar Pearce (12/9/1885 - 31/8/1963)awarded an Order of the British Empire (military) in 1919 whilst a Captain (acting Major) in the Royal Engineers. He is thought to have been a civil engineer and to have lived in India for a long while, retiring back to England.

The following photo shows the Pearce family who were involved in the mill in the nineteenth and early twentieth century. It was probably taken at Lorraine House, Park road, Gloucester. Nearly all of those in the photo were shareholders.

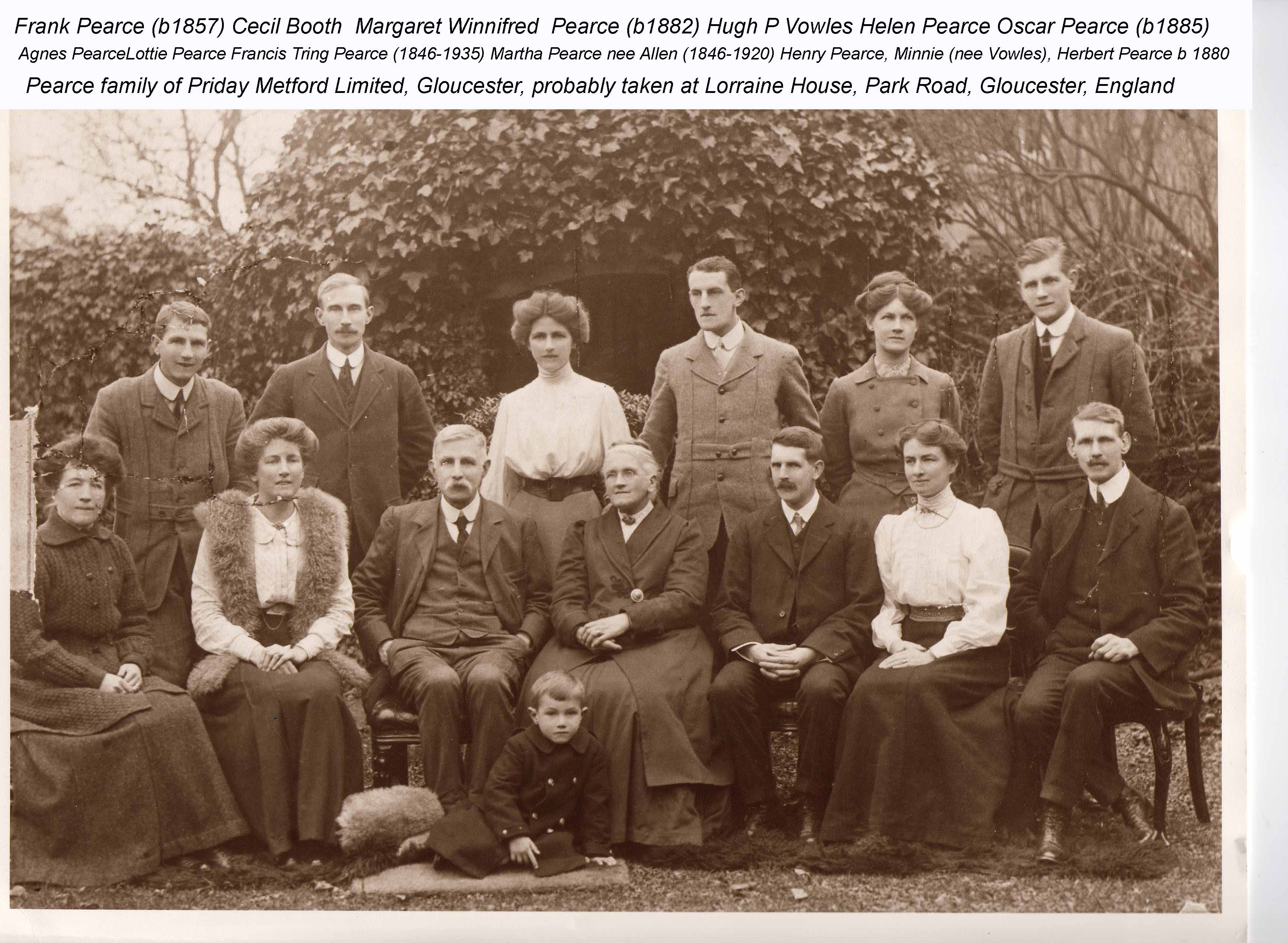

== References and sources ==
Sources

- Conway-Jones, H. (1984). "Gloucester Docks. An Illustrated History". Alan Sutton & Gloucestershire County Library.
- Various articles and newspaper items in Gloucester City Library.
- Gloucester Record Office.
