= The Engineer (UK magazine) =

British engineering magazine

- Editor: Jon Excell
- Frequency: Monthly
- Founder: Edward Charles Healey
- First issue: 4 January 1856; 170 years ago
- Company: Mark Allen Group
- Country: United Kingdom
- Based in: London
- Language: English
- Website: www.theengineer.co.uk
- ISSN: 0013-7758

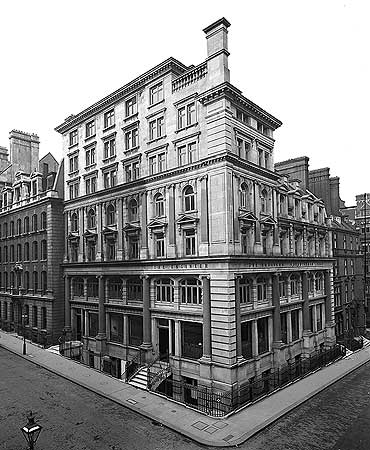
Oswaldestre House, 33-35 Norfolk Street, London, once the home of The Engineer.

The Engineer is a London-based monthly magazine and website covering the latest developments and business news in engineering and technology in the UK and internationally.

== History and description ==
The Engineer was founded in January 1856. It was established by Edward Charles Healey, an entrepreneur and engineering enthusiast with financial interests in the railways whose friends included Robert Stephenson and Isambard Kingdom Brunel. The journal was created as a technical magazine for engineers.

The Engineer began covering engineering including inventions and patents during a high point of British economic manufacturing power. In the 19th century it also published stock prices of raw materials. Together with the contemporary Engineering journal the work is considered a valuable historical resource for the study of British economic history. Early editors included Vaughan Pendred (1865–1905), Loughnan St Lawrence Pendred (1905–46) and Benjamin Pendred (from 1946).

On 10 July 2012 the magazine announced its final print edition, the editor Jon Excell citing "increasing distribution and production costs, and the impact of an ongoing economic crisis on advertising revenues [which] have conspired to create a challenging environment for magazine publishers". The owner of The Engineer, Centaur Media proposed to focus the magazine’s editorial and commercial resources on growing the website, which had relaunched in 2009, and other digital products. According to Excell, demand for the print edition was such that after a 12-month hiatus, The Engineer returned as a monthly print magazine in September 2013. As of 2019, The Engineer publishes 10 issues a year and has a presence on social media and the news aggregator Flipboard. The magazine runs an annual conference for the industry and an annual awards ceremony for the encouragement of collaboration in innovation. The Engineer was acquired from Centaur Media by the Mark Allen Group in June 2019.

== See also ==
- Engineer, house magazine of the U.S. Army Engineer School
