= Hubert Cecil Booth =

English engineer

- Hubert Cecil Booth
- Born: 4 July 1871; Gloucester, England
- Died: 14 January 1955 (aged 83); Croydon, England
- Education: City and Guilds Institute, London
- Spouse: Charlotte Mary Pearce (m. 1903; died 1948)
- Father: Abraham Cecil Booth
- Engineering career
- Discipline: Civil engineer
- Institutions: Institution of Civil Engineers
- Significant advance: Invented vacuum cleaner

Hubert Cecil Booth (4 July 1871 – 14 January 1955) was an English engineer, best known for having invented one of the first powered vacuum cleaners.

He also designed Ferris wheels, suspension bridges and factories. Later he became Chairman and Managing Director of the British Vacuum Cleaner and Engineering Co.

== Early life ==
Booth was born in Gloucester, England in 1871. He was educated at Gloucester College and Gloucester County School under headmaster the Reverend H. Lloyd Brereton. In 1889 he entered the Central Technical College, City and Guild, London, after passing the entrance examination. He completed a three-year course in civil engineering and mechanical engineering under Professor William Cawthorne Unwin FRS. He completed the Diploma of Associateship (ACGI), coming second in the engineering department. He became a student of the Institution of Civil Engineers.

== Career ==
In December 1892, he entered the drawing office of Messrs Maudslay Sons & Field, Lambeth, London under Mr Charles Sells, as a civil engineer. In this capacity he designed bridges and large ferris wheels for amusement parks in London, Blackpool, Paris, and Vienna. He also worked on the design of engines for Royal Navy battleships.

=== Vacuum cleaner ===
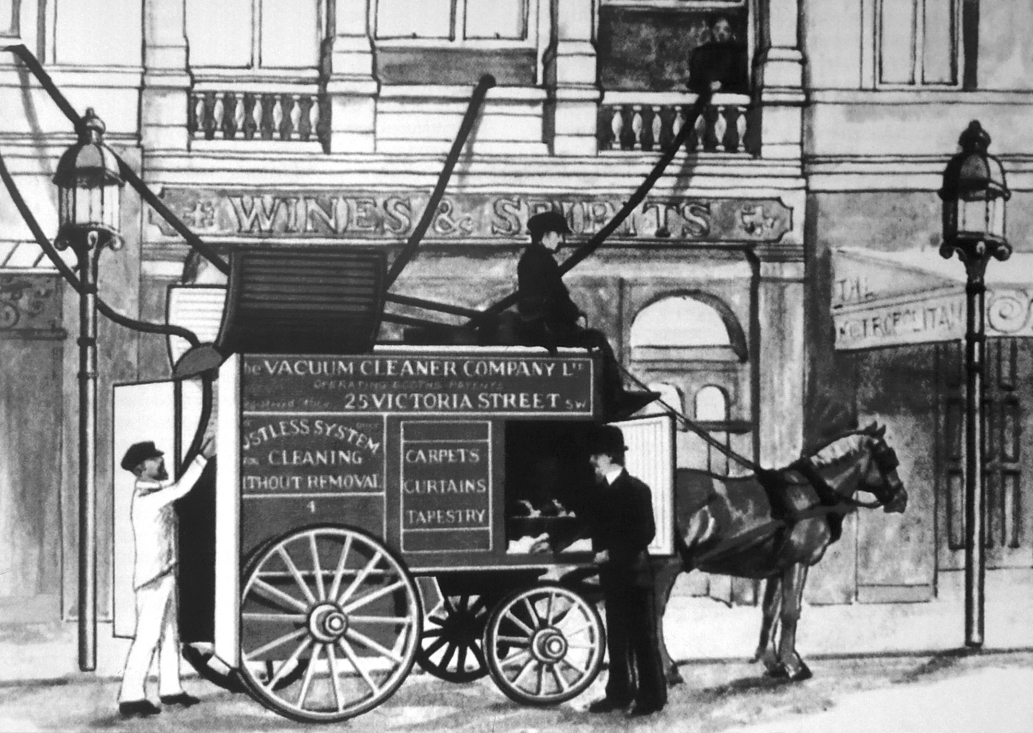
Street cleaning machine developed by Hubert Cecil Booth (drawing, 1901)

Booth is known for introducing one of the first powered vacuum cleaners. Before Booth introduced his version of the vacuum cleaner, cleaning machines blew or brushed dirt away, instead of sucking it up. As Booth recalled decades later, in 1901, he attended "a demonstration of an American machine by its inventor" at the Empire Music Hall in London. The inventor is not named, but Booth's description of the machine conforms fairly closely to American inventor John S. Thurman’s blown air design. Booth watched a demonstration of the device, which blew dust off the chairs, and thought that "...if the system could be reversed, and a filter inserted between the suction apparatus and the outside air, whereby the dust would be retained in a receptacle, the real solution of the hygienic removal of dust would be obtained." He tested the idea by laying a handkerchief on the seat of a restaurant chair, putting his mouth to the handkerchief, and then trying to suck up as much dust as he could onto the handkerchief. Upon seeing the dust and dirt collected on the underside of the handkerchief, he realized the idea could work.

Booth created a large device, driven by an internal combustion engine. Nicknamed the "Puffing Billy", Booth's first petrol-powered, horse-drawn vacuum cleaner relied upon air drawn by a piston pump through a cloth filter. It did not contain any brushes; all the cleaning was done by suction through long tubes with nozzles on the ends. Although the machine was too bulky to be brought into the building, its principles of operation were essentially the same as the vacuum cleaners of today. He followed this up with an electric-powered model, but both designs were extremely bulky, and had to be transported by horse and carriage. The term "vacuum cleaner" was first used by the company set up to market Booth's invention, in its first issued prospectus of 1901.

Booth initially did not attempt to sell his machine, but rather sold cleaning services. The vans of the British Vacuum Cleaner Company (BVCC) were bright red; uniformed operators would haul hose off the van and route it through the windows of a building to reach all the rooms inside. Booth was harassed by complaints about the noise of his vacuum machines and was even fined for frightening horses. Gaining the royal seal of approval, Booth's motorised vacuum cleaner was used to clean the carpets of Westminster Abbey prior to Edward VII's coronation in 1901. The device was used by the Royal Navy to improve the level of sanitation in the naval barracks. It was also used in businesses such as theatres and shops, although the device was too large to be feasibly used as a domestic appliance. When cleaning the Royal Mint, upon leaving he was arrested as his machine had collected a massive amount of silver dust from the coins and he had forgotten to empty it. He was however quickly released.

Booth received his first patents on 18 February and 30 August 1901. Booth founded Goblin, his company to sell vacuum cleaning services and refined his invention over the next several decades. Though Goblin lost out to competition from Hoover in the household vacuum market, his company successfully turned its focus to the industrial market, building ever-larger models for factories and warehouses. Booth's company, now BVC, lives on today as a unit of pneumatic tube system maker Quirepace Ltd.

== Personal life ==
In 1903, Booth married Charlotte Mary Pearce, one of the daughters of Francis Tring Pearce, director of the Priday, Metford and Company Limited. He was a friend of Hugh Pembroke Vowles. He was offered a knighthood; however, he turned it down. His father, Abraham Booth, was involved in the development of the transatlantic telephone lines. Booth died on 14 January 1955, in Croydon, England.

== Tribute ==
On 4 July 2018, Google celebrated his 147th birthday with a Google Doodle.
