= Loughnan St Lawrence Pendred =

Loughnan Pendred, c. 1930

Loughnan St Lawrence Pendred CBE (23 November 1870 – 20 November 1953) was a British mechanical engineer and editor of The Engineer, a weekly newspaper for engineers, from 1905 to 1946. He was president of the Newcomen Society (1921–23 and 1928–30) and of the Institution of Mechanical Engineers (1930).

== Biography ==
He was born in London in 1870, the son of Marian (née Loughnan) and Vaughan Pendred (1836–1912). His father preceded him as editor of The Engineer, and had previously edited The Mechanics' Magazine. Both his parents came from Ireland; his father was from Barraderry, County Wicklow, and his mother from Crohill, County Kilkenny.

Loughnan Pendred was educated at the South Kensington Central Institution and Finsbury Technical College. He was apprenticed at the Colchester firm, Davey, Paxman and Co., and then worked in Ghent and France until 1893. On his return to the UK, he worked at William Armstrong's Elswick Ordnance works (1893–96).

He started to work at The Engineer in 1896, succeeding his father as its editor in 1905, and continued as its editor until 1946, when his son Benjamin Pendred took over. In all, the Pendred family were editors of The Engineer for 102 years. Loughnan Pendred also edited the Ministry of Munitions Journal during the First World War. During his tenure at the publication, he accepted papers on the history of engineering; he also contributed papers on Trevithick's locomotives, Brunton's steam horse and the Cheadle New Wire Company to Transactions of the Newcomen Society.

== Awards and societies ==
Pendred was one of the founders of the Newcomen Society and hosted the dinner at the Savage Club at which the society's name was chosen. He was twice president of the Newcomen Society (1921–23 and 1928–30), He was also president of the Institution of Mechanical Engineers (1930) and the Institution of Engineers-in-Charge (1926–28). He was elected an honorary member of the Institution of Mechanical Engineers in 1934, and gave the institution's Thomas Lowe Gray lecture that year, on "A survey of Ships and Engines". He was made CBE in 1934.

== Personal life ==
He married Laura Mary Wildig in 1900; they had two sons. He died on 20 November 1953 at Twickenham.

Professional and academic associations
Preceded by Daniel Adamson	President of the Institution of Mechanical Engineers; 1930	Succeeded by Edwin Kitson Clark
