= Herbert Elliott Pearce =

English poet

Herbert Elliott Pearce (3 February 1880 – 14 March 1957) was an English poet from Gloucester.

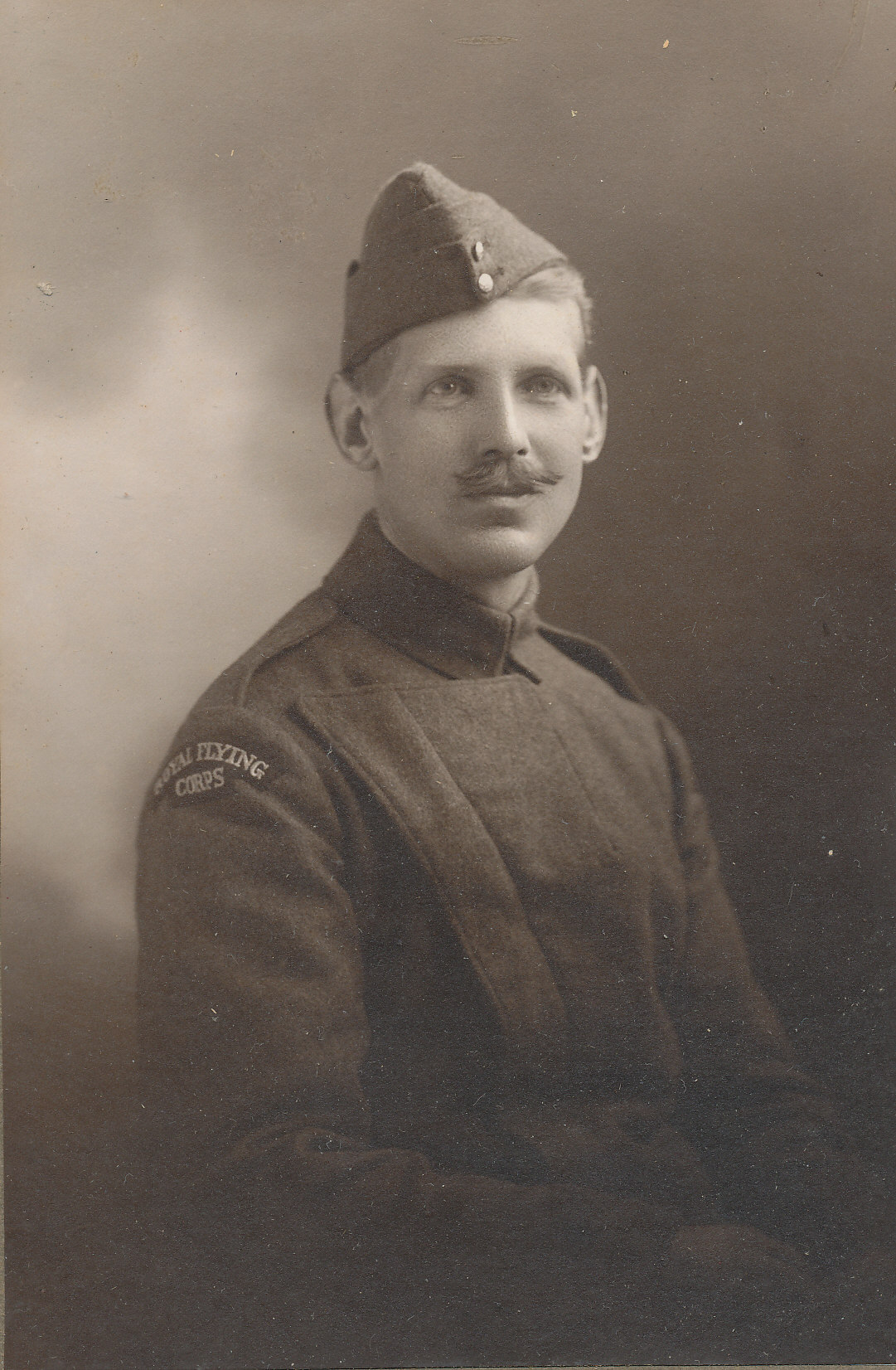
Herbert Elliott Pearce

He published two books on poetry: "Humorous verse and stories in rhyme" Albert E Smith, Gloucester 1957 and "Poems and Rhymes" Arthur H Stockwell, 1953. Pearce was injured with the Royal Flying Corps in the First World War, served with the Gloucester Regiment and later owned "Hobday and co" ironmongers of Pimlico, on the corner of Moreton and Tachbrook streets. His family were co-owners of Priday, Metford and Company Limited, Gloucester.

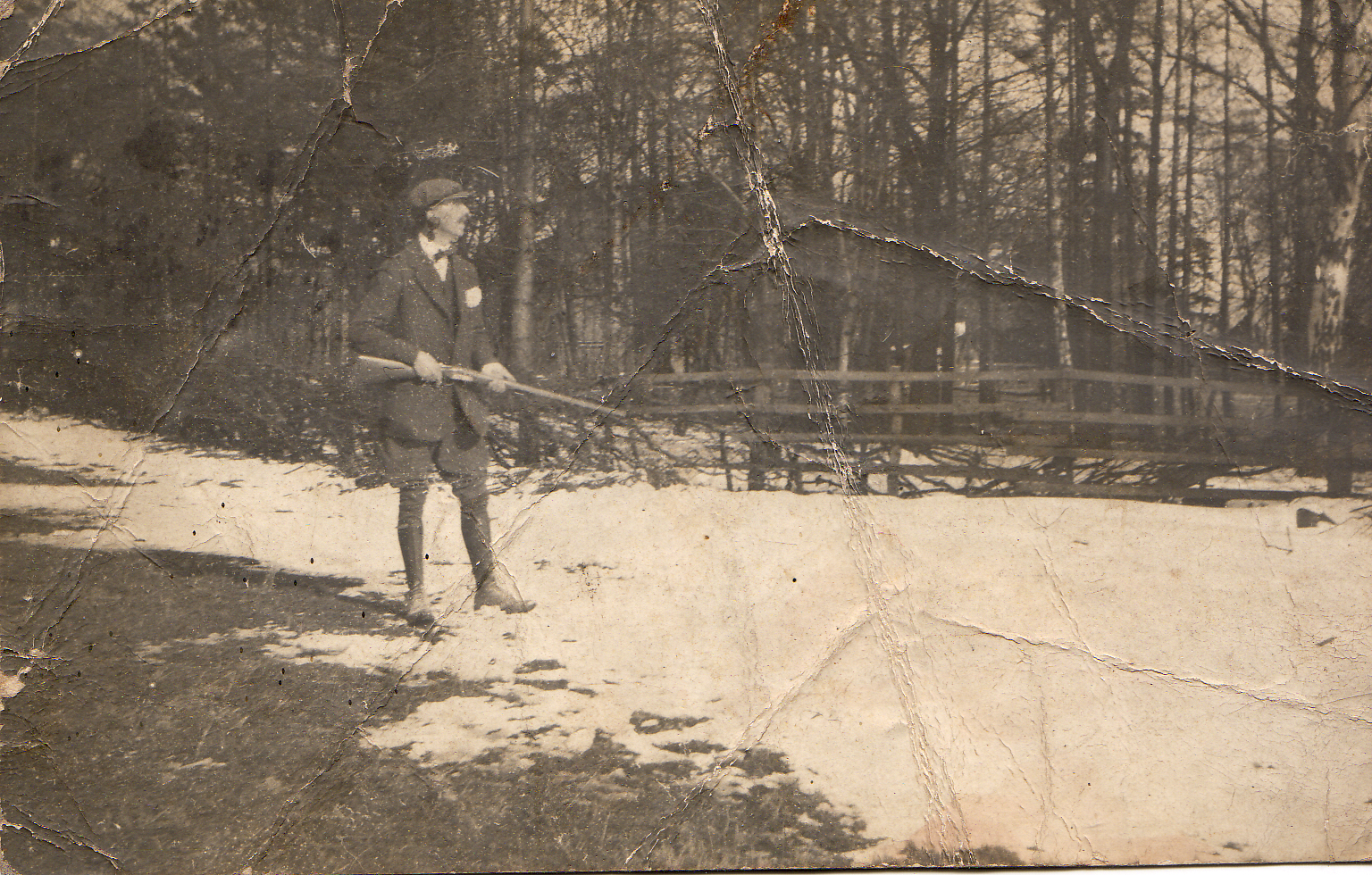
Herbert Elliott Pearce in 1917. Inscribed "Taken at Easter this marvellous spring of 1917" and posted to Lieut H H Vowles, B Co, 13th Glosters, BEF France"
