= Thomas Thistle =

English Anglican priest (1853–1936)

Thomas Thistle (22 November 1853, in Toxteth Park, Liverpool, Lancashire, England – 7 February 1936, in Eling vicarage, Southampton Hampshire) was an Anglican priest in England, New Zealand and Australia. He became headmaster of Hereford Cathedral School, a medieval foundation.

== Family background ==
Thomas Thistle was the son of Thomas Thistle, a wool draper and gentleman of Liverpool (born 1813 Ugglebarnby, Yorkshire died 1892) and Alice Smith (born c. 1817 Whitby, North Riding of Yorkshire died 1893).

== Education ==
He attended Durham School from 1866 to 1873 and in 1873 matriculated aged 19 at Corpus Christi College, Oxford University. In 1877, he was awarded a Bachelor of Arts degree and in 1880 a Master of Arts, both from Oxford.

== Later life ==
In 1878, he was made a deacon and in 1879 a priest, both in London. From 1878 to 1882, he worked as a curate at Holy Trinity Marylebone within the Diocese of London. In 1881, he was unmarried and living at Great Portland Street, Marylebone.

In 1883, Thistle arrived at Waihora, Auckland, New Zealand. From 1883 to 1884, he worked as an assistant master at Auckland University College. In 1884, he was an examiner at the University of New Zealand. In 1885, he received his general licence in the diocese of Tasmania, Australia. From 1885 to 1886, he was warden at Christ Church College, Hobart Tasmania. On 30 November 1886 he received his letters testimonial from the bishop of Tasmania. He subsequently returned to England and from 1887 to 1890, worked as assistant to the headmaster of Ripon Grammar School. From 1890 to 1897, he was headmaster at Hereford Cathedral school. In 1891 with wife residing Hereford St John. From 1897 until his death he was vicar of Eling, Southampton within the Diocese of Winchester.

== The Thistle Chapel, Eling ==
Eling parish church is the tenth oldest church in England, dating back to 850. The church contains a "Thistle chapel", furnished in memory of Thomas Thistle.

== Publications ==
The Offices of St Wilfrid affording to the use of the church of Ripon: from A Psalter belonging to the Dean and Chapter of Ripon Cathedral, with an English translation (1893) by John Whitham (Chapter clerk of Ripon Cathedral and a Life member of the Yorkshire Archeological Society) assisted by Rev. Thomas thistle, M.A. (late assistant head master of the Ripon Grammar School and now head master of the Hereford Grammar school)
