= Margaret Winifred Vowles =

English author on science

Margaret Winifred Vowles (née Pearce; 4 January 1882, Gloucester – 4 March 1932, Kingston) was an English author on science.

== Parentage ==
She was the daughter of Francis Tring Pearce (16 Mar 1846 – 19 May 1935) and Martha Allen of Lorraine House, Gloucester, England. FT Pearce was a director of Priday, Metford and Company Limited millers of Gloucester. Her maternal grandfather was Henry Allen who was Mayor of Gloucester in 1873.

== Education ==
She took a Bachelor of Science Degree from the University of London for which she studied at Cheltenham Ladies' College. She became a member of the History of Science Society and the Women's Engineering Society. Prior to her death she had been living in Wimbledon for two years and was a member of the local branch of the Women Citizen's Association. She published one book and a number of articles on science with her husband Hugh Pembroke Vowles.

== Gallery ==
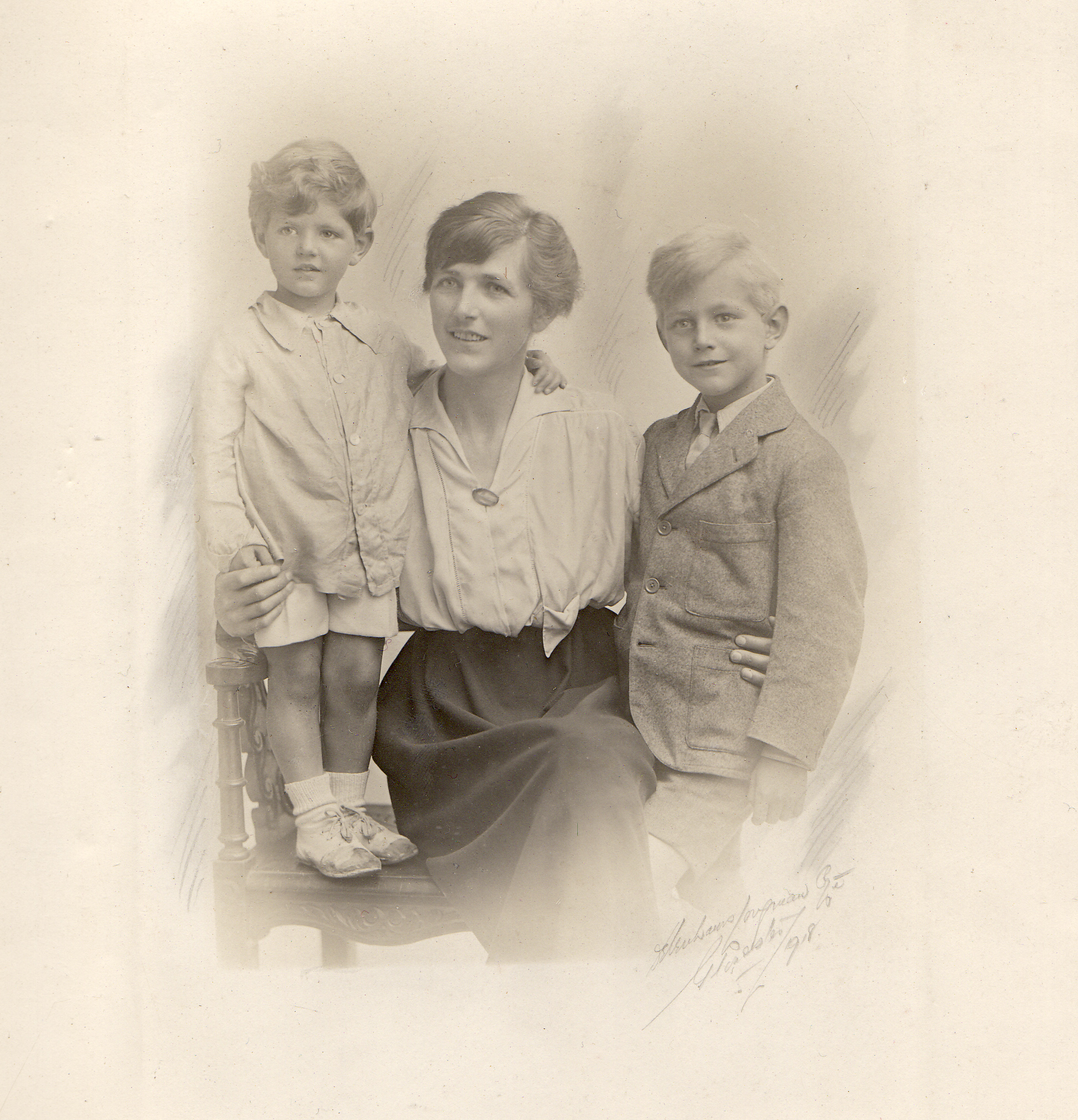
Christopher Vowles, Margaret W Vowles née Pearce and Francis Hugh Vowles c1916

== Publications ==
- The Quest for Power (Chapman and Hall, London, 1931 book published with Hugh Pembroke Vowles)
- Science and Industrial Insanity. Article published with Hugh Vowles. Date uncertain.
