= Martin Laing =

British businessman (1942–2023)

Sir Martin Laing CBE, DL, FRICS
- Born: John Martin Kirby Laing; 18 January 1942
- Died: 27 December 2023 (aged 81); Malta
- Occupation: Businessman

Sir John Martin Kirby Laing (18 January 1942 – 27 December 2023) was a British businessman in the construction industry.

Martin Laing was executive chairman of John Laing plc, the firm founded by his great-great-grandfather James Laing (1816–1882), but resigned in 2001 when the company faced major losses in its construction business, ending 152 years and five generations of family management.

== Early life and education ==
The son of Sir William Kirby Laing (1916–2009) and the grandson of Sir John William Laing (1879–1978), he was educated at St. Lawrence College, Ramsgate and Emmanuel College, Cambridge.

== Career ==
In 1985, he succeeded his father Sir Kirby Laing as chairman of John Laing plc. His uncle, Sir Maurice Laing, had also been chairman.

Martin Laing was knighted in the New Year Honours 1997 for services to the construction industry.

Laing remained executive chairman of the family firm until 2001 when its construction arm was sold for £1 to one of its subcontractors, concrete firm O'Rourke, run by Ray O'Rourke. The John Laing construction business was considered one of the blue-riband contractors of its day, having built high-profile schemes including the Second Severn Crossing, the Barbican Centre and the Sizewell B nuclear power station, and its sale was expected to fetch upwards of £100m. However, the business was facing a series of losses, eventually totalling £200m, on several jobs including Cardiff's Millennium Stadium, the National Physical Laboratory, a disastrous PFI scheme in Teddington, west London, and No 1 Poultry in the City of London. As part of the deal, O'Rourke left most of the problem contracts with John Laing, and created Laing O'Rourke.

John Laing subsequently sold its property and housing businesses to Kier Group and Wimpey in 2002, becoming an infrastructure investment business before eventually being acquired by US private-equity firm Kohlberg Kravis Roberts in 2021.

In the Sunday Times Rich List 2008 ranking of the wealthiest people in the UK, Martin Laing was placed 472nd with an estimated fortune of £175 million.

Laing was chair of the Trust for more than three decades. He also served as chair of the British Overseas Trade Board from 1995 to 1999, and chair of World Wide Fund for Nature UK from 1990 until 1997. He was elected to the Smeatonian Society of Civil Engineers in 1986 and was the society's president in 2008.

Laing died in Malta on 27 December 2023, at the age of 81.

== Sources ==
- Burke's Peerage
