= Anna Stewart (businesswoman) =

British businesswoman

Anna Marie Stewart (May 1964 – 5 October 2017) was a British businesswoman, CEO of the construction company Laing O'Rourke (2013–2015), and a non-executive director of Babcock International.

Stewart was born in May 1964. In 1982, she joined Laing Construction as a trainee, rising to commercial director. Ray O'Rourke took over the company in 2001, and Stewart became CEO in April 2013. She was a non-executive director of Babcock International.

Stewart stood down as CEO of Laing O'Rourke in December 2015 because of ill health, and the chairman Ray O'Rourke took over as CEO. Anna Stewart died on 5 October 2017, aged 53, from undisclosed causes.
