= Glass Pharms =

British medical cannabis cultivator

Glass Pharms Ltd
- Type: Private
- Industry: Pharmaceutical cultivation
- Founded: November 27, 2020
- Headquarters: London, United Kingdom
- Key people: James Duckenfield (CEO); Adam George (Chairman)
- Products: Medical cannabis flower (for CBPM manufacture)
- Website: glasspharms.com

Glass Pharms is a British medical cannabis company. Incorporated in November 2020, it cultivates cannabis flowers for the manufacture of Cannabis-Based Products for Medicinal use in Humans (CBPMs) as legalised by a modification of the 2001 Misuse of Drugs Regulations, effective 1 November 2018. This change in the law permits physicians on the GMC Specialist Register to prescribe cannabis-based medicines.

The first supply of UK-grown medical cannabis flower to patients took place in June 2024, grown by Glass Pharms and supplied to patients via Releaf clinic.

The company’s facility in Wiltshire, England, sources its power and heat from a neighbouring anaerobic digestion plant as part of a patented low-carbon cultivation model. Media highlighted the potential to reduce reliance on imports as well as the regulatory challenges facing new UK producers.

== History ==
After incorporation on 27 November 2020, the company secured financing from JLEN, now called FGEN, for over £25 million to build its custom-built facility to supply the UK medical cannabis prescription market.

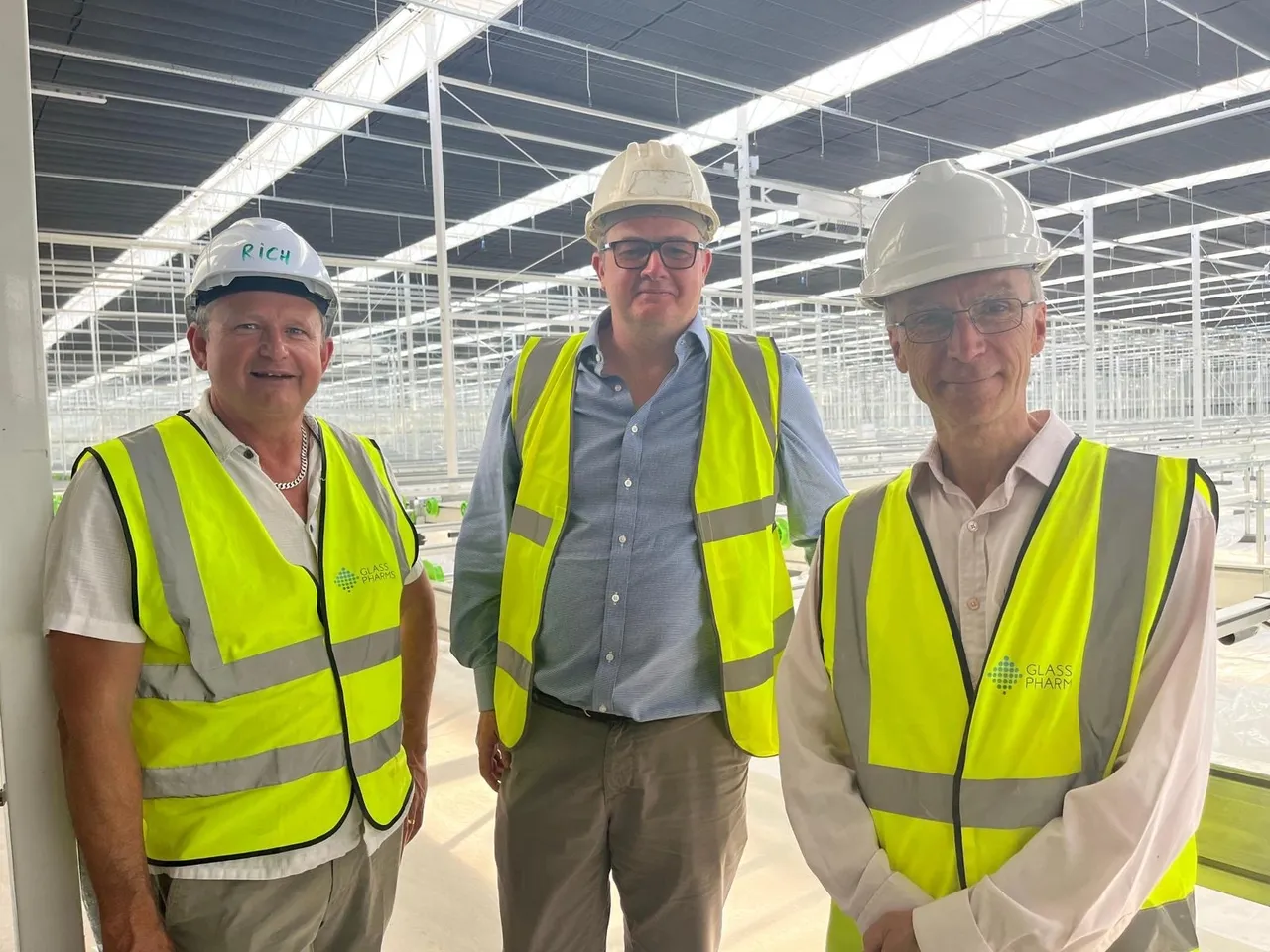
Dr Andrew Murrison MP visit to Glass Pharms

In 2023, the company marked site completion with a visit from a Member of Parliament, Surgeon Commander The Right Honourable Doctor Andrew Murrison VR MP. Murrison was among the physician-MPs who supported the changes to the law on medical cannabis in 2018.

In 2023, Glass Pharms and other stakeholders funded a health-economic analysis of NHS prescribing of medical cannabis for chronic pain; the Cannabis Industry Council and Drug Science commissioned the analysis, and the York Health Economics Consortium (YHEC) at the University of York conducted the health-economic modelling. The study was published in October 2024 and suggested potential NHS savings of up to ~£4 billion per year under certain assumptions.

In October 2024, Glass Pharms and the Advanced Plant Growth Centre at the James Hutton Institute announced they were to commence a medical cannabis research programme, supported by UK Research and Innovation’s Biotechnology and Biological Sciences Research Council (BBSRC).

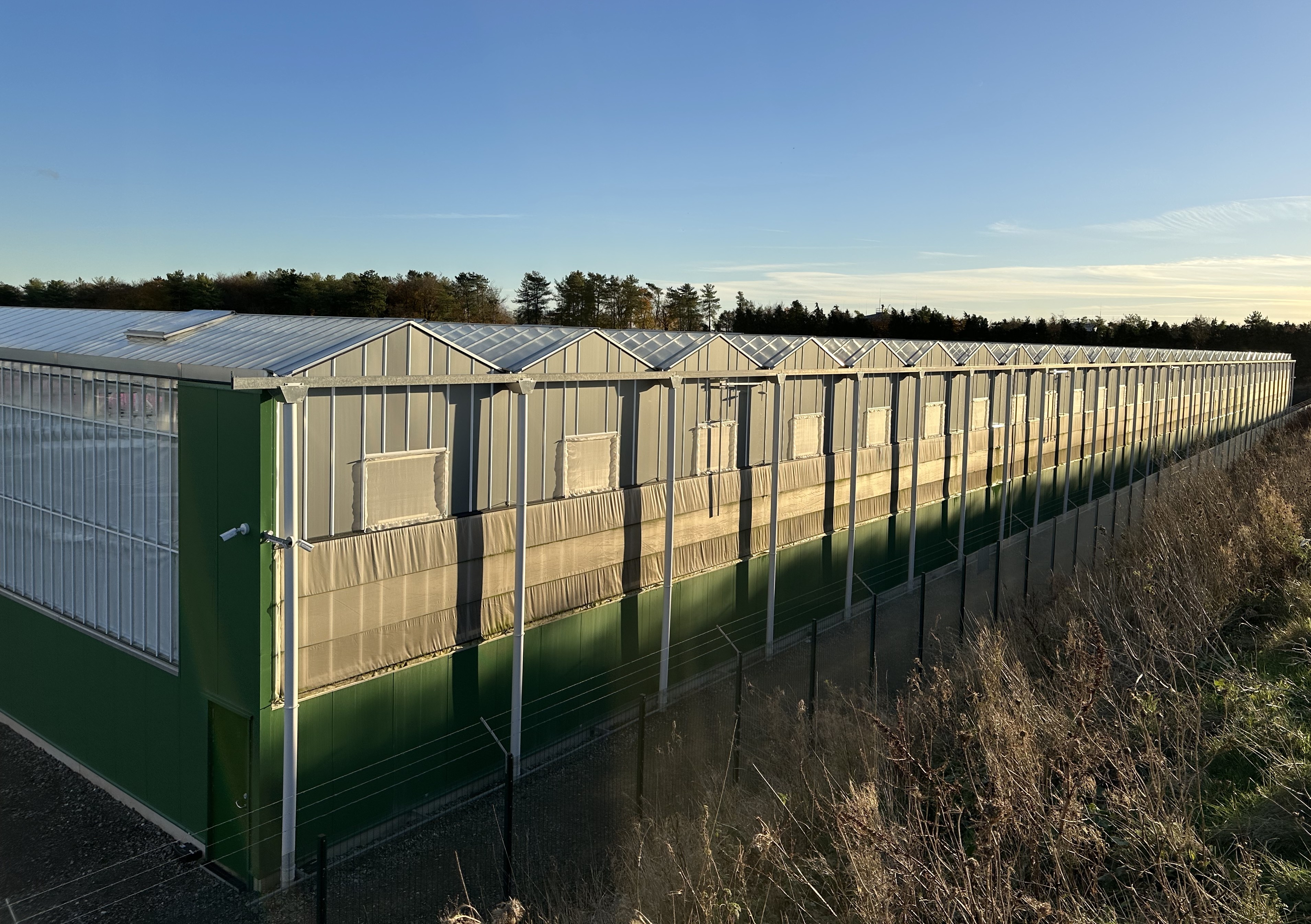
Glass Pharms Exterior 2024

== Facilities and Operations ==
The company operates a patented 2.4 ha greenhouse complex in Wiltshire designed for the continuous cultivation of medical cannabis.

Reported features include electricity and heat from anaerobic digestion run from food waste, rainwater harvesting, air recirculation, and a vertical airflow regime intended to reduce microclimates and mould risk. Robotic plant movements and AI-managed climate control are also used.

In March 2025, BBC Radio 4’s On Your Farm broadcast an episode from the facility, presented by Charlotte Smith and produced by Rebecca Rooney, which examined its cultivation methods and low-carbon design.

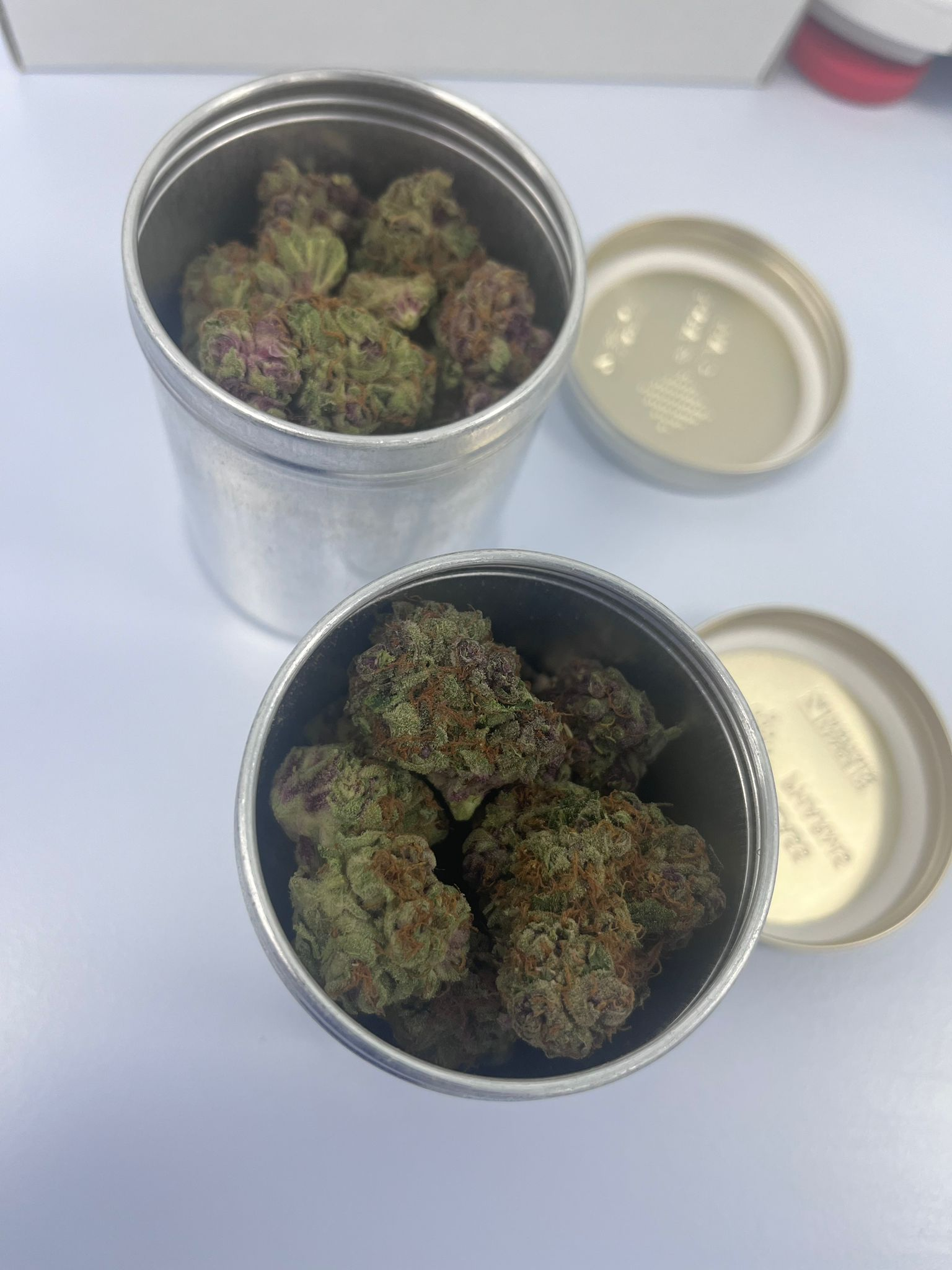
Medical Cannabis Flower

== Products and Distribution ==
Glass Pharms produces cannabis flower in the United Kingdom for supply to licensed third parties in the manufacture of cannabis-based products for medicinal use (CBPMs).

The company is a member of the Cannabis Industry Council.

== See also ==
- Medical cannabis in the United Kingdom
- Drug Science
- University of York
