= Sydney Metro Metropolis Stock =

Class of train used on Sydney Metro, Australia

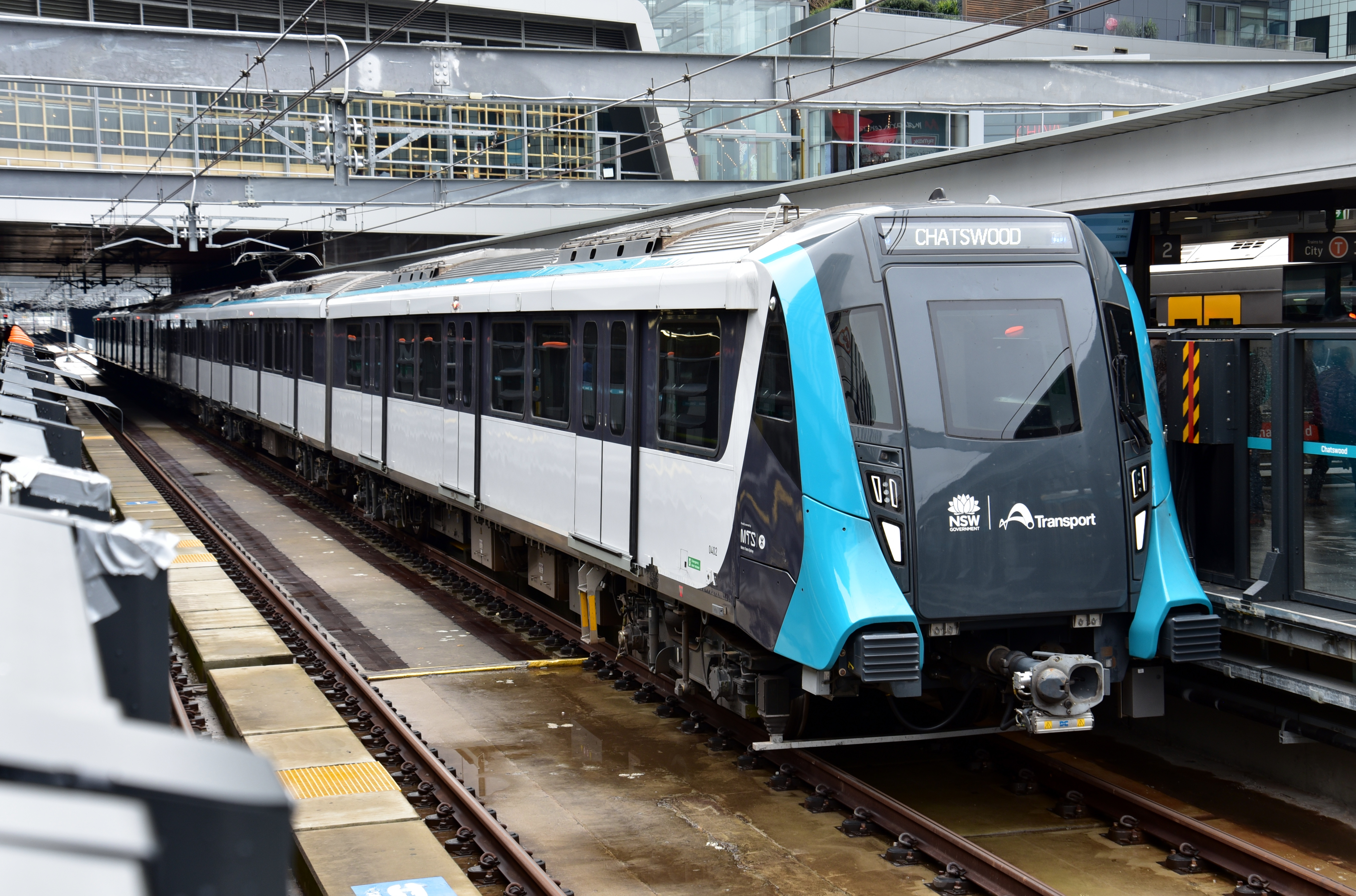
- A Metropolis Stock at Chatswood station

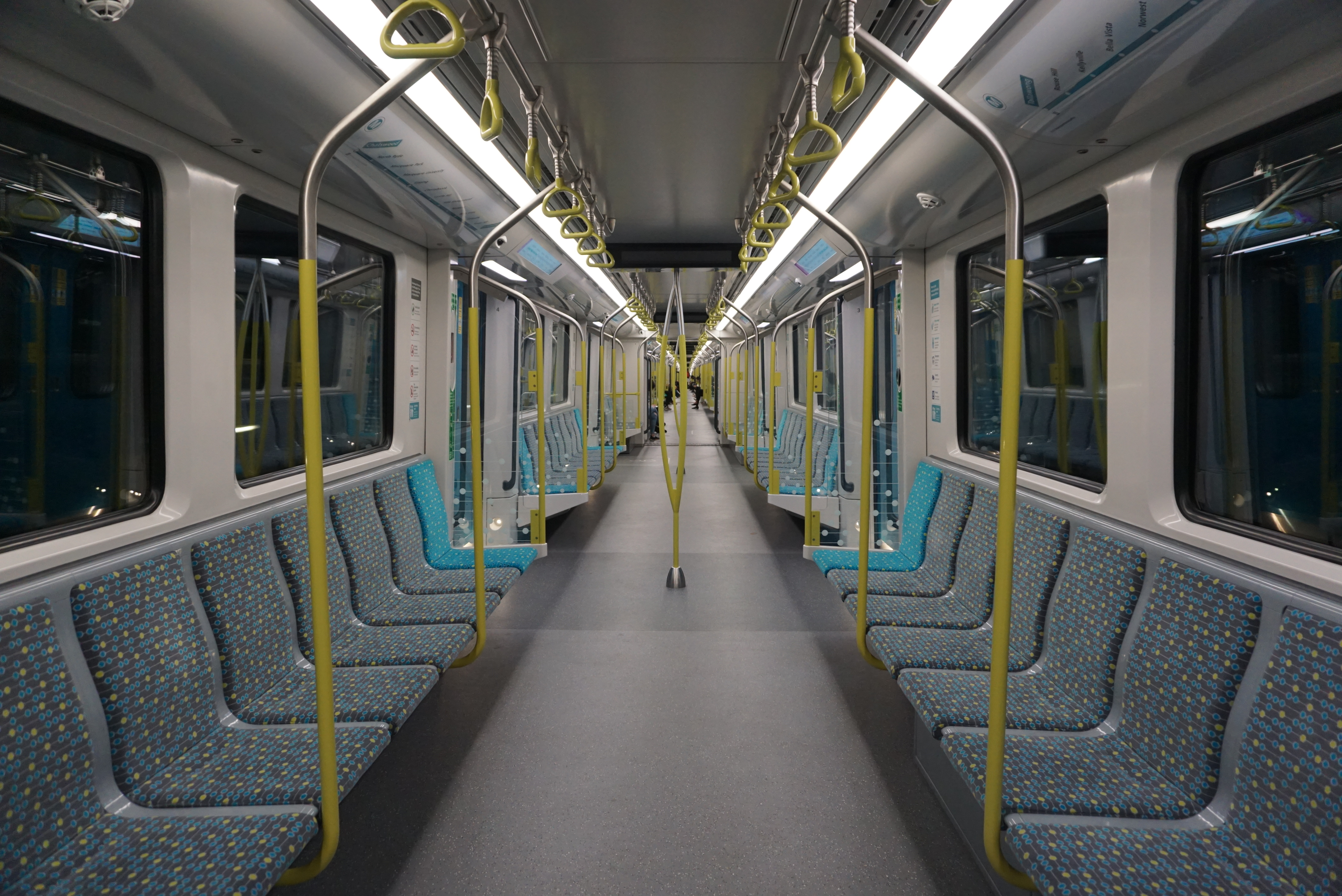
- Interior
- Stock type: Metro (EMU)
- In service: 2019–present
- Manufacturer: Alstom
- Designer: Xavier Allard
- Built at: Sri City, India
- Family name: Metropolis
- Constructed: 2016–2018 (first batch); 2019–2024 (second batch)
- Entered service: 26 May 2019
- Number built: 45 sets
- Number in service: 45 sets
- Formation: 6 car sets TC–MPC–MC–MC–MPC–TC
- Fleet numbers: 01 – 45
- Operator: Metro Trains Sydney
- Depots: Rouse Hill; Marrickville
- Line served: North West & Bankstown

Specifications
- Car body construction: Stainless steel
- Train length: 121.5 m (398 ft 7 15/32 in)
- Car length: 20.25 m (66 ft 5 1/4 in)
- Width: 3,035 mm (9 ft 11 1/2 in)
- Height: ~3.7 m (12 ft 1 11/16 in)
- Doors: 3 per side
- Wheel diameter: 840–770 mm (33–30 in) (new–worn)
- Wheelbase: 2,300 mm (91 in)
- Maximum speed: 120 km/h (75 mph) (design); 100 km/h (62 mph) (service)
- Weight: 240 t (240 long tons; 260 short tons)
- Traction system: Alstom OPTONIX 2-level IGBT–VVVF
- Traction motors: 16 × Alstom 4-ECA-2120 200 kW (270 hp) 3-phase AC induction motor
- Power output: 3.2 MW (4,300 hp)
- Acceleration: 1.2 m/s^{2} (3.9 ft/s^{2})
- Deceleration: 1.1 m/s^{2} (3.6 ft/s^{2}) (service); 1.4 m/s^{2} (4.6 ft/s^{2}) (emergency)
- Electric systems: 1,500 V DC (nominal) from overhead catenary
- Current collection: Pantograph
- UIC classification: 2′2′+Bo′Bo′+Bo′Bo′+Bo′Bo′+Bo′Bo′+2′2′
- Bogies: B 23
- Braking system: Electro-pneumatic
- Safety systems: Alstom Urbalis 400 moving block CBTC with subsystems of ATC, ATO under GoA 4 (UTO), ATP, Iconis ATS and Smartlock CBI
- Coupling system: Dellner
- Seating: Longitudinal
- Track gauge: 1,435 mm (4 ft 8 1/2 in) standard gauge

The Sydney Metro Metropolis Stock is a class of electric multiple units that operate on the Sydney Metro network. Built by Alstom as part of their Metropolis family, the trains are the first fully automated passenger rolling stock in Australia as well as the first single-deck electric trainsets to operate in Sydney since their withdrawal from the suburban rail network in the 1990s.

They first entered service in May 2019 with the opening of the Metro North West Line, with additional trainsets ordered for the City & Southwest extension, which partially opened in 2024, with the remaining Sydenham to Bankstown section opened in 2026. A total of 270 carriages, making up 45 6-car sets have been built.

== History ==
=== Procurement ===
In June 2012, the North West Rail Link project (later Sydney Metro North West) announced that it would use single deck "metro" style trains, rather than the double deck trains more commonly used in Sydney. In May 2013, Minister for Transport Gladys Berejiklian announced that two consortia had been shortlisted for the Operations and Train Systems (OTS) contract. The winning consortium would build the trains, install signalling and other electronic systems, as well as operate the line as a public–private partnership.

- Northwest Rapid Transit (a consortium of John Holland, Leighton Contractors, MTR Corporation, Plenary Group and UGL Rail)
- TransForm (a consortium of Bombardier Transportation, John Laing Investments, Macquarie Capital, McConnell Dowell, Serco and SNC-Lavalin Capital)

In June 2014, Northwest Rapid Transit was selected by Transport for NSW for the OTS contract. The $3.7 billion contract was formally awarded by the New South Wales Government in September 2014.

Northwest Rapid Transit subsequently contracted Alstom to build 22 6-car automated Metropolis trainsets for the line, as well as install a communications-based train control (CBTC) signalling system at a cost of $1.7 billion.

=== Design and construction ===
In November 2015, the design of the train was unveiled by Minister for Transport Andrew Constance, with the full-scale model of the train later displayed at public events such as the 2016 Sydney Royal Easter Show. It consisted of the front carriage, and was approximately 75% of the length of the final design, having two doors instead of three.

The trains were manufactured at Alstom's rolling stock facility at Sri City in India, with the first train arriving in New South Wales in September 2017. In February 2018, dynamic testing on the first of the trainsets began. Testing was done on brakes, passenger information displays, lighting and door operation. In July 2018, Alstom was awarded a 15 year maintenance contract for the trains and the signalling system. In December 2018, production of the 22 trainsets was completed. On 14 January 2019, the first driverless Metro train completed the full journey between Tallawong and Chatswood.

=== Introduction into service ===
On 26 May 2019, the trains entered service on the Metro North West Line, operated by Metro Trains Sydney, a joint venture between the MTR Corporation, John Holland and UGL Rail.

In November 2019, the Northwest Rapid Transit public–private partnership was extended to cover the City & Southwest extension. As part of this contract expansion, Alstom would deliver an additional 23 6-car trainsets as well as signalling to serve the extension at a cost of €350 million ($563 million). The contract includes options for additional trains and extension of existing trains to 8 cars in length in future. By November 2022, four of these additional trainsets had entered service on the Metro North West Line, ahead of the opening of the City & Southwest extension. In March 2024, it was announced that all 45 trains had been tested over the full length of the line. The Chatswood to Sydenham portion of the City & Southwest project extension opened in August 2024, with the remaining Sydenham to Bankstown portion of the line opening in October 2026.

Other Sydney Metro lines will not use the Metropolis sets, with the Western Sydney Airport line using Sydney Metro Inspiro Stock ordered from Siemens, and the Sydney Metro West will use trains ordered from CRRC.

=== Incidents ===
On 2 April 2025, Metropolis set 25 was recorded departing Chatswood with one set of doors open. Although immediately identified by staff, the doors remained open from departure at Chatswood until the train arrived at Crows Nest, where the doors were manually closed and the train was subsequently taken out of service.

== Design ==
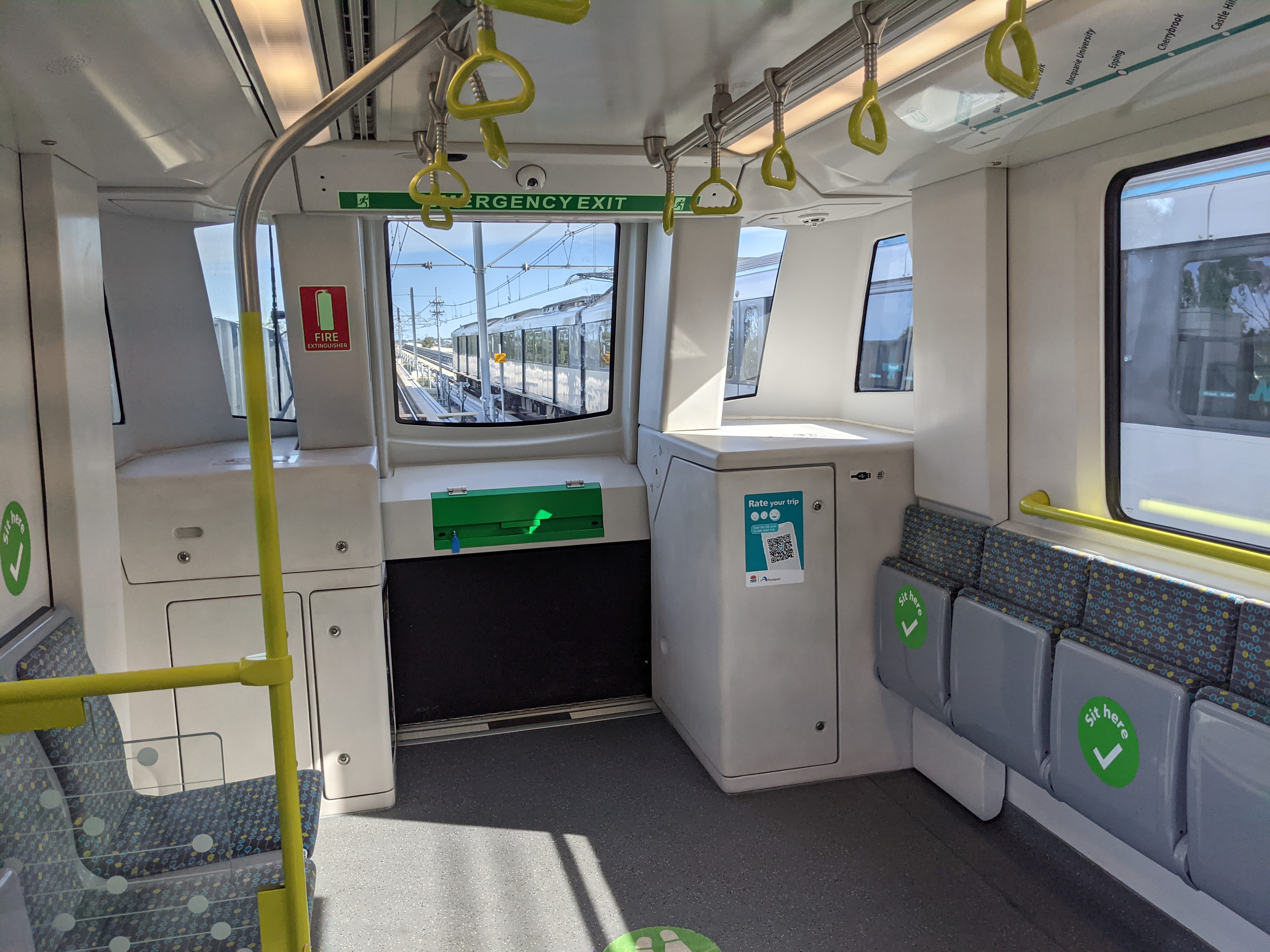
Driving end of the train

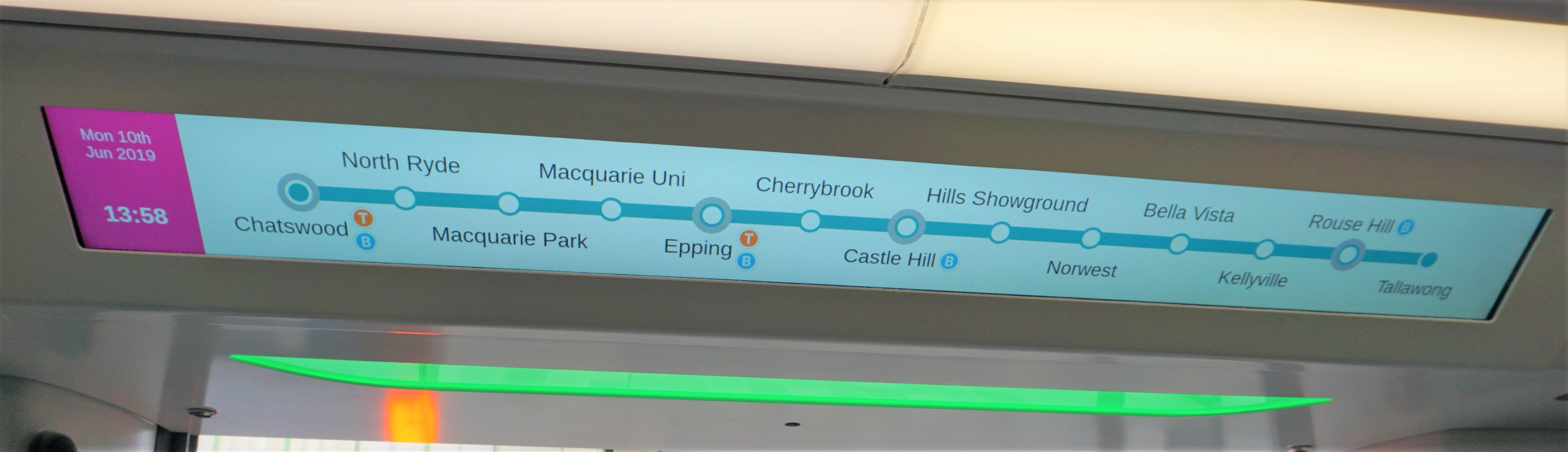
Original digital displays before commencement of the City and Southwest Line

Each single-deck train features two dedicated areas for prams, luggage and bicycles. There are three doorways per side per carriage and no internal gangway doors between the carriages. In a 6-car configuration the trains have a seating capacity of 378 people, with a total capacity of 1,100. The trains utilise Alstom's Urbalis 400 communications-based train control signalling system that ensures trains are capable of driving and operating automatically at all times without a driver or attendant on board, including door closing, obstacle detection and dealing with emergency situations.

The trains feature longitudinal 'bench-style' seating per carriage (similar to most metro rapid-transit/subway trains), with distinctly coloured seats for priority and disabled passengers. Seats in wheelchair spaces can fold up in order to fit prams and wheelchairs. A doorway-status light is installed above each doorway, which illuminates white when the doors are fully closed, green when the doors are fully open, and flashes in red when the doors are opening or closing.

Features of the Metropolis sets include CCTV cameras, internal passenger information display (PID) screens and digital voice announcements. The PID screens display the name of the next station, along with icons for available transport mode interchanges. The sets are also fitted with air conditioning and emergency help points. There are also USB charging ports at the end of cars 01 and 02.

The Metropolis sets are operated via a control centre based at Tallawong. In the event the system is otherwise unable to operate the train, an engineer can manually take over the train's functions. The trains are maintained at the Sydney Metro Trains Facility at Tallawong, with overnight stabling of trains at Sydney Metro Trains Facility South in Marrickville following the opening of the City & Southwest extension.

Since early 2024, some sets have received an updated livery with the addition of a teal stripe along the entire length of the set just underneath the side windows.

=== Service formation ===
The 270 Alstom Metropolis carriages form 45 six-car sets. Individual vehicles are numbered as follows:

	←Tallawong			Bankstown→		
01 : 45	0101 : 4501	0103 : 4503	0105 : 4505	0106 : 4506	0104 : 4504	0102 : 4502

- Cars 01 & 02 are control trailer cars.
- Cars 03 & 04 are non-control motor cars with pantographs.
- Cars 05 & 06 are non-control motor cars.

Car 01 always faces the Tallawong end, while car 02 always faces the Sydenham end.

In the event that extensions to 8 cars happens if sufficient demand warrants the contract, two infill carriages will be added between cars 05 and 06.

== See also ==
- Sydney Metro Inspiro Stock – similar automated trains to be used on the Sydney Metro Western Sydney Airport
