= Sydney Metro Inspiro Stock =

Future electric trains in Sydney

- Conceptual design of the train
- Stock type: Metro (EMU)
- In service: 2027 (projected)
- Manufacturer: Siemens Mobility
- Built at: Vienna, Austria
- Family name: Inspiro HC
- Number under construction: Total delivery of 12 sets
- Formation: 3-car sets DM1–Tp–DM2
- Fleet numbers: 01–12
- Capacity: 645 (194 seats)
- Operator: RATP Dev
- Depot: Orchard Hills
- Line served: Western Sydney Airport

Specifications
- Car body construction: Stainless steel
- Train length: 67.63 m (221 ft 11 in)
- Width: 3.19 m (10 ft 6 in)
- Floor height: 1.15 m (3 ft 9 in)
- Doors: 3 per side
- Maximum speed: 100 km/h (62 mph)
- Electric system: 25 kV 50 Hz AC (nominal) from overhead catenary
- Current collection: Pantograph
- UIC classification: Bo′Bo′+2′2′+Bo′Bo′
- Coupling system: Dellner
- Seating: Longitudinal, transverse
- Track gauge: 1,435 mm (4 ft 8 1/2 in) standard gauge

The Sydney Metro Inspiro Stock are a class of electric multiple units currently being built to operate on the Sydney Metro network starting from 2028. Built by Siemens Mobility as part of their Inspiro High Capacity (HC) family, the trains are the second fully automated passenger rolling stock in Australia.

A total of 36 carriages, forming 12 3-car trains, have been ordered for the Western Sydney Airport Line, set to open by late 2027.

== History ==
=== Procurement ===
In 2021, it was announced that three consortia had been shortlisted for the Stations, Systems, Trains, Operations and Maintenance (SSTOM) contract of the Sydney Metro Western Sydney Airport line. The winning consortium would build the stations and trains, install signalling and other electronic systems, as well as operate and maintain the line as a public–private partnership.

- Bradfield Metro, comprising John Laing, Keolis Downer, FCC Construction Australia and Hitachi Rail STS
- Parklife Metro, comprising Plenary Group, Webuild, RATP Dev and four Siemens Mobility companies
- WestGo, comprising CIMIC Group (Pacific Partnerships, CPB, UGL Engineering and UGL Rail), two Acciona companies, DIF Management Australia, ComfortDelGro Transit and Coleman Rail Pty Ltd

In December 2022, Parklife Metro was selected by Transport for NSW for the SSTOM contract. Siemens would provide 12 3-car trains, together with 15 years of maintenance, as well as signalling, electrification, communication systems, platform screen doors and the depot at a cost of €900 million.

In January 2025, a full-size mockup of a train car was presented to assess features including ergonomics, lighting, information screens and emergency systems.

The first train missed its planned November 2025 arrival date in New South Wales, with delivery rescheduled to the first half of 2026. The 12 trains are being manufactured by Siemens Mobility in Vienna; Sydney Metro stated that production was on schedule, while the trainsets had been undergoing testing in Germany since November 2025. The first train arrived in Port Kembla on 30 June following customer testing in Vienna, and was assembled at the Orchard Hills depot. Subsequent deliveries planned at three week intervals.

== Design ==
The seat upholstery draws inspiration from the Cumberland Plain, where the line is located. It was designed by BBR, led by Dharug artist, Leanne Redpath, with Tina Barahanos and Alexandra Byrne. The design is named Ngurra Baduwa, referring to "country" and water. Priority seats will be yellow, representing scenes of meeting places around waterholes, with wattle flowers. Seat upholstery will require approximately 2,300 m^{2} of fabric.

== Specifications ==
Each car will have 3 double doors per side, and will have open gangways. Trains will have step-free access, with wheelchair spaces and hearing loops in every car. Both longitudinal and transverse seats will be used, alongside "multifunctional" areas with tip-up seats. Seats are designed to allow under-seat luggage storage, with headrests provided on transverse seats. There will be 2 redundant air-conditioning units per car alongside floor heating.

Screens will show real time flight information from Western Sydney Airport. Each train will have 4 bicycle storage spaces.

The trains will make use of Siemens' Railigent X asset management system for predictive maintenance, involving a failure reporting, analysis, and corrective action system and reliability-centered maintenance concepts.

The trains are approximately 30 cm wider than the existing Alstom Metropolis trains, and will use 25 kV 50 Hz AC electrification unlike the Metro North West & Bankstown Line.

Other Sydney Metro lines will not use the Inspiro sets, with the North West & Bankstown Line using Sydney Metro Metropolis Stock from Alstom, and the Sydney Metro West will use trains ordered from CRRC.

== See also ==
- Sydney Metro Metropolis Stock – similar automated trains used on the Sydney Metro North West & Bankstown Line
