= Ray O'Rourke =

Ray O'Rourke may refer to:

- Ray O'Rourke (footballer) (born 1948), Australian football player
- Ray O'Rourke (businessman) (born 1947), Irish businessman, chairman and CEO of Laing O'Rourke
