= Kirby Laing =

British civil engineer (1916–2009)

- Born: 21 July 1916; Carlisle
- Died: 12 April 2009 (aged 92)
- Engineering career
- Discipline: Civil,
- Institutions: Institution of Civil Engineers (president), Smeatonian Society of Civil Engineers (president)

Sir William "Kirby" Laing DL JP FREng (21 July 1916 – 12 April 2009) was a British civil engineer.

== Career ==
Laing was born in Carlisle in 1916. He was a member of the Laing Family, famous in the British construction industry for running John Laing plc. He was the son of Sir John Laing and the brother of Sir Maurice Laing. Kirby Laing learnt about the construction industry from his father and would visit the company's construction sites with him during the school holidays. Laing graduated from Emmanuel College, Cambridge, in 1937 and began work as a graduate engineer for John Laing plc. He was a member of the fifth generation of the Laing family to join the firm. During the Second World War Laing served in the Royal Engineers, receiving his commission as a Second lieutenant on 2 January 1944. He resigned his commission as a Lieutenant in the Territorial Army Reserve of Officers on 13 July 1955, although he was permitted to retain the honorary title of lieutenant.

In 1946 he became joint managing director of Laing (the parent company of John Laing plc) and from 1956 to 1976 he was chairman of the Laing Group. Whilst leading the company Laing built on their experience of power station and housing construction and expanded into road building. In 1976 his brother, Maurice, was made chairman and Kirby became deputy chairman. Kirby retired as deputy chairman in 1980, having also been chairman of the Laing properties division. In 1968 Kirby had been elected a first class member of the Smeatonian Society of Civil Engineers and would serve as their president in 1988. He also served as president of the Institution of Civil Engineers from November 1973 to November 1974 and was an honorary member of the American Society of Civil Engineers.

Laing returned to military service by being invited to join the Engineer and Railway Staff Corps, an unpaid, voluntary Territorial Army unit which advises the British Army on engineering matters. He joined as a Major on 14 October 1966, was commissioned Lieutenant-Colonel on 23 December 1967 and Colonel on 17 May 1971. He became the corps' commanding officer on 12 January 1978 and retired from the army on 4 August 1997.

In 1977 Laing was elected to the Fellowship of Engineering. He was also president of the National Federation of Building Trades Employers and of the London Master Builders Association. He was also chairman of the Construction Industry Research and Information Association and the National Joint Council of the Building Industry. In 1975 he chaired the government's Advisory Committee on Fixed Offshore Installations. He was a member of the Royal Albert Hall Council from 1970, served as their president from 1972 to 1992 and then remained their vice-president.

Laing was made a knight bachelor on 8 June 1968, an honour which was conferred on him by Queen Elizabeth II on 5 November 1968. He served as a Justice of the Peace for Middlesex and was made Deputy Lieutenant of London on 12 June 1978. Laing was made Deputy Lieutenant of Hertfordshire on 8 April 1987. He established the Kirby Laing Foundation as a charity to make grants and donations to charitable causes. Laing was married to Lady Isobel Laing and both were trustees of the foundation.

His son Martin Laing became executive chairman of John Laing plc, but resigned in 2001 when the company faced major losses in its construction business, ending 152 years and six generations of family management.

Professional and academic associations
Preceded by Roger Hetherington	President of the Institution of Civil Engineers; November 1973 – November 1974	Succeeded by William Gordon Harris
