= Olivier Brousse =

French business executive

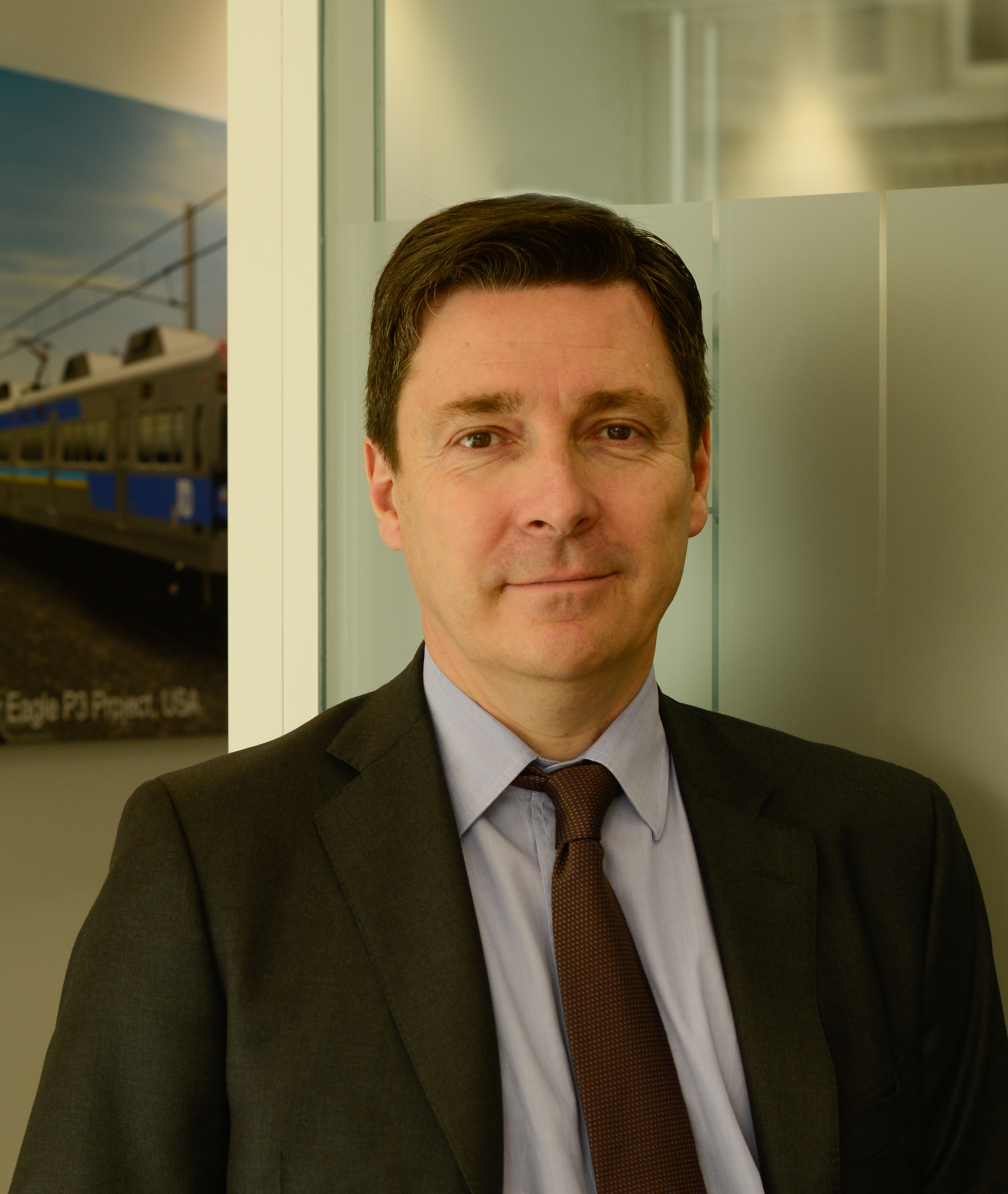
- Born: 28 February 1965 (age 61); Brive-la-Gaillarde, France
- Education: École Polytechnique
- Occupation: CEO of idverde

Olivier Brousse (born 28 February 1965) is the CEO of the largest European landscaping company with 1 bn € of annual revenues from 6 countries. He joined in 2021. Before joining idverde he was CEO of John Laing PLC in London, an international greenfield infrastructure investor, where he led the successful IPO and grew the business internationally.

Previously he was CEO of the Saur Group, the third largest water and waste company in France, CEO of Veolia Transportation in the US, and CEO of Connex, one of the UK’s busiest rail networks.

== Early life ==
Originally from Brive-la-Gaillarde, in Corrèze, France, where he went to school until his bacalaureat, Olivier Brousse graduated from Ecole Polytechnique in 1985 and holds an engineering degree from the School of Bridges and Roads (ENPC). He is a member of the Henry Crown Fellows Program (2006) of the Aspen Institute in the United States.

== Career ==
Olivier Brousse started his career in 1990 as Commercial Director at Unic Systèmes, a small company specialising in drafting tables and computer-aided design systems. In 1994, he joined the French water services group Générale des Eaux, as project director for the CEO, Henri Proglio. He spent 14 years with the group which became Veolia Environnement, a group specialising in water, waste, energy and transportation throughout the world. In 1998, he was appointed General Manager for the company’s UK transportation division based in London, managing the UK rail network’s largest privatised network(s). Three years later, in 2001, he became General Manager of Veolia Transportation Inc, Veolia’s US transport division, based in Washington DC. During this time the company acquired ATC which resulted in the firm being the leading private operator of urban passenger transport in the USA. In 2006, he was appointed Executive Vice President of Veolia Transport, based in Paris. In 2008 he left Veolia to join Saur as CEO, a role he kept until 2014, when he joined infrastructure investor John Laing, a British investment company based in London with investment projects worldwide. After the successful IPO in 2015 John Laing invested in greenfield infrastructure projects in Europe, Australia and New Zealand, in the US and Latin America.

Olivier left John Laing in 2020 and joined idverde as Group CEO.

== idverde ==
Olivier was appointed Group CEO of idverde in 2021, the largest landscaping company in Europe, which he then left in February 2024.

== Saur Group ==
In 2008, Olivier Brousse was recruited to join the Saur Group as CEO where he helped develop the group's activities in Europe and the Middle East. He was appointed Executive Chairman of the Group in February 2013, at the beginning of negotiations to refinance the Group. Following the successful completion of the refinancing project, in January 2014, Olivier Brousse announced his departure to go and work overseas.

== John Laing ==
John Laing Group appointed Brousse as Chief Executive in March 2014.

== Legion of Honour ==
In February 2016, Brousse was awarded a Legion d’ Honneur,

== Other ==
Olivier Brousse is a French entrepreneur and businessman. He is a Chevalier de l'Ordre National du Merite.

Brousse has been President of FP2E, the trade body for water service companies in France. He was appointed in 2011 following his time as vice president since 2008. He is a member of the American Aspen Institute and a Henry Crown fellow.

Olivier is on the board of directors at Brive Rugby Club
