= Sydney Metro =

Transit system in New South Wales, Australia

- Roundel

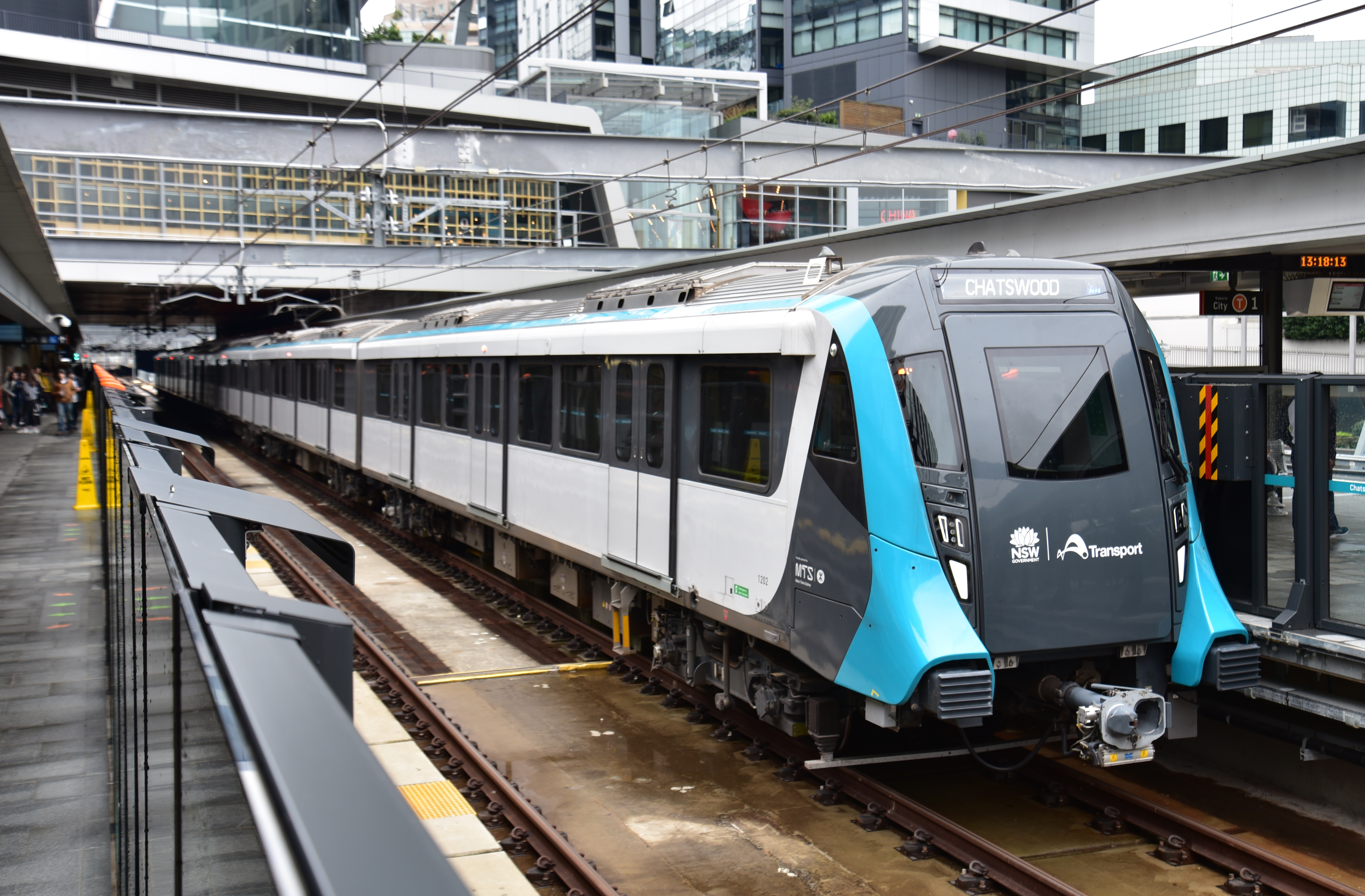
- A Metropolis Stock at Chatswood

Overview
- Owner: NSW Government (via the Transport Asset Manager of New South Wales)
- Locale: Sydney
- Transit type: Rapid transit
- Number of lines: 1; 2 (under construction); 3 (total)
- Line number: M1
- Number of stations: 31; 15 (under construction); 46 (total)
- Daily ridership: 245,574 (Weekdays FY2025/26)
- Annual ridership: 72,475,869 (FY2025/26)
- Chief executive: Camilla Drover
- Website: sydneymetro.info

Operation
- Began operation: 26 May 2019 (Tallawong to Chatswood); 19 August 2024 (Chatswood to Sydenham); 30 October 2026 (Sydenham to Bankstown)
- Operation will start: 2027 (Western Sydney Airport); 2032 (West)
- Operator: Metro Trains Sydney
- Character: Elevated, open cut and underground
- Number of vehicles: North West and City & South West: 45 6-car Metropolis Stock sets (270 cars); Western Sydney Airport: 12 3-car Inspiro Stock sets (36 cars)
- Train length: Sydney Metro North West, City and South West: 6 Carriages (with potential for 2 additional carriages to be added); Sydney Metro Western Sydney Airport: 3 or 4 carriages
- Headway: 4 minutes (peak frequency); 5–7 minutes (intra-peak frequency); 10 minutes (off-peak & weekend frequency)

Technical
- System length: 66 km (41 mi) 47 km (29 mi) (under construction); 113 km (70 mi) (total)
- Track gauge: 1,435 mm (4 ft 8 1/2 in) standard gauge
- Electrification: Overhead catenary: 1,500 V DC (North West, City and Southwest); 25 kV 50 Hz AC (Western Sydney Airport, West)
- Top speed: 100 km/h (62.1 mph)

The Sydney Metro is an automated rapid transit system in Sydney, New South Wales, Australia. It currently consists of one route, the M1 Metro North West & Bankstown Line, running between Tallawong and Bankstown and consisting of 31 stations on 66 km (41 mi) of twin tracks, mostly underground.

The first segment of the M1 Metro North West Line between Tallawong and Chatswood was constructed under the Sydney Metro Northwest project and opened in May 2019. The project included the conversion and integration of the Epping to Chatswood rail link into the line. In August 2024, the first stage of the Sydney Metro City & Southwest project was completed, which extended the line from Chatswood to Sydenham and renamed it the M1 Metro North West & Bankstown Line. The second stage of the Sydney Metro City & Southwest project was completed in October 2026, extending the line from Sydenham to Bankstown along a converted section of the Bankstown railway line.

Two additional lines are currently under construction, the Sydney Metro Western Sydney Airport and Sydney Metro West projects. The Sydney Metro Western Sydney Airport project is constructing a line approximately 23 km (14 mi) from St Marys to Bradfield. Scheduled to open in 2027, it will comprise six stations and service Western Sydney Airport. The Sydney Metro West project is constructing a 24 km (15 mi) line from Westmead to a new station at Hunter Street in the Sydney CBD. It will comprise nine stations, serviced by fully underground twin tracks. The line will service Parramatta and Sydney Olympic Park upon opening in 2032. When both projects are complete, the network will increase to a total of 46 stations and 113 km (70 mi) of track.

The M1 Metro North West & Bankstown Line is Australia's only fully automated passenger rail system. It is managed by the Sydney Metro agency, under the umbrella of Transport for NSW. Services are operated by Metro Trains Sydney and integrated with the established Sydney Trains network. Its 66 km (41 mi) length also makes it the second-longest driverless rapid transit line in the world, behind M11 of the Istanbul Metro.

== History ==
=== Earlier proposals ===
The first proposals for a metro system in Sydney were put forward in 2001, when Co-ordinator-General of Rail Ron Christie released his "Long-term Strategic Plan for Rail" report, outlining long-term goals for the expansion of the rail network. He suggested that some "metro" lines—operationally independent from the existing network—should be constructed past 2020 due to capacity constraints. This was later dismissed by the New South Wales Government as only a "shopping list" of potential projects.

The idea for a metro resurfaced in late 2007 when discussions about an underground 'Anzac Line' took place within the NSW Government. The line would have run from West Ryde in Sydney's northwest to Malabar in the southeast but did not come to fruition. In early 2008, following the shelving of various heavy rail expansion projects from the 2005 Metropolitan Rail Expansion Program (MREP), the Government officially announced the 37 km (23 mi) North West Metro. Expected to cost $12 billion, it would have linked Rouse Hill in Sydney's northwest with the CBD, with construction starting in 2010 and finishing in 2017.

The construction of the North West Metro was dependent upon the privatisation of the electricity network, but, after a change of the state's Premier in late 2008, it was cancelled due to budgetary concerns. Its replacement was the 9 km (5.6 mi), $4 billion CBD Metro, a shortened route running from Rozelle in the inner-west and into the CBD through to Central railway station. Construction was scheduled to start in 2010, like its predecessor, but would finish earlier in 2015. The CBD Metro was to have formed the "central spine" of a future metro network, with a planned West Metro extension to Westmead and Parramatta to be constructed soon after, subject to Federal funding.

Reception to the plans was mixed, with Opposition leader Barry O'Farrell accusing the Premier of "making it up as he goes along" after costings were not released until after the press conference; criticism came from the Greens because the route seemed designed to pass through marginal electoral seats. The Government's initial submission to Infrastructure Australia for funding was rejected due to "a lack of integrated planning". It was later revealed that the cost had jumped from $4 billion to $5.3 billion in six months, as well as that internal estimates showed that the metro would run at only 15% of its maximum capacity.

The CBD Metro was cancelled in early 2010 after the Premier was deposed a few months before in 2009. The Government had spent almost $410 million on the project. The new Premier Kristina Keneally chose instead to focus on the expansion of the existing heavy rail network, including the North West Rail Link and South West Rail Link.

=== Revival ===
Project logo

In mid-2012, the newly elected Coalition government announced Sydney's Rail Future and the NSW Transport Masterplan. Under this proposal, the North West Rail Link would be built as a single-deck, privately operated metro connecting to a future second harbour crossing. These plans received criticism on the basis that they might not have the capacity of existing double-deck trains and concerns over the inability of trains on the existing network to use the new crossing. Later, the route was extended and the name changed to Sydney Metro.

In 2014, the Government announced the second harbour crossing under the name Sydney Rapid Transit, as part of the 'Rebuilding NSW' infrastructure plan funded through the sale of electricity infrastructure. The new railway would cross Sydney Harbour, tunnel beneath the CBD, and join a converted portion of the Bankstown line up to Bankstown railway station.

The system was officially renamed 'Sydney Metro' in June 2015 following the passage of power privatisation bills. Opposing parties warned the government that the sale of the power infrastructure may not provide the capital needed.

In July 2018, Sydney Metro was established as a statutory authority, tasked with leading the delivery of the metro system. Peter Regan was Chief Executive of the agency from March 2021 until May 2026. Former interim CEO of NSW Motorways Camilla Drover became the next CEO.

In January 2023, it was announced that the emergency exits in tunnels on the Metro West and Metro Western Sydney Airport lines will be spaced at 240 m (260 yd) where possible, matching the existing lines.

In February 2023, as part of the 2023 state election campaign, the government of Dominic Perrottet announced business cases would be produced for further extensions for the Sydney Metro network. This included the following links:

- Tallawong to St Marys
- Westmead to the Aerotropolis (Bradfield Station)
- Bankstown to Glenfield via Liverpool
- Macarthur to the Aerotropolis (Bradfield Station)

== Operations ==
Sydney Metro services are operated by Metro Trains Sydney, a joint venture between MTR Corporation, ComfortDelGro, and UGL Rail, who will operate and maintain the network under a 15-year contract. The network is fully automated to the GoA4 level and uses CBTC signalling throughout.

=== Network ===
The M1 Metro North West & Bankstown Line is currently the only line in the Sydney Metro network, linking Tallawong to Bankstown with 31 stations along a 66 km (41 mi) distance.

Services began between Tallawong and Chatswood in May 2019. For the first 6 months of operation, they were supplemented with trackwork-style rail replacement buses for late-night services from Sundays to Wednesdays. The section to Sydenham through the city centre opened in August 2024. The extension to Bankstown opened in late October 2026.

=== Capacity ===
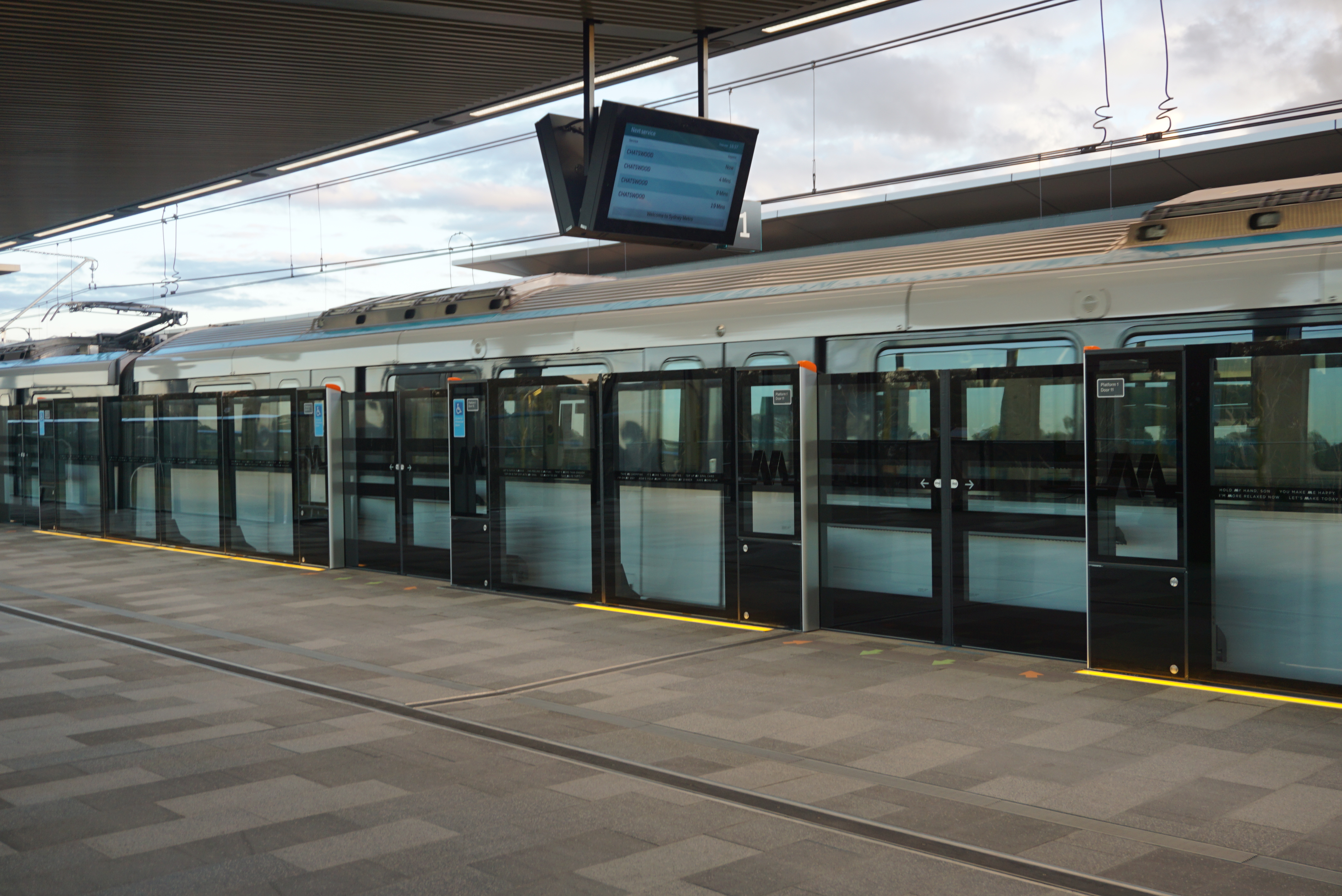
Platform screen doors are standard across the network.

The M1 Metro North West & Bankstown Line currently operates with 6-car trains running on 4-minute headways. After the addition of the Stage 2 extension to Bankstown, the stations' platforms will be configured to allow for future use of 8-car trains and the signalling system designed to allow for 2-minute headways, both of which are planned to be introduced once increased patronage demands it. Eight-car trains have a design capacity of 1,539 customers and increasing the running frequency to ultimately 30 trains per hour (2-minute headway) would provide a maximum capacity of 46,170 passengers per hour per direction.

=== Rolling stock ===
Class	Image	Type	Top speed		Carriages	Entered service	Formation	Lines
Class	Image	Type	km/h	mph	Carriages	Entered service	Formation	Lines
Metropolis		Electric multiple unit	120	75	270	2019–2024	6 cars	M1 Metro North West & Bankstown Line
Inspiro		Electric multiple unit	100	62	36	2027	3 cars	Western Sydney Airport

==== Metropolis ====
The network currently operates using 45 6-car Metropolis Stock trains, which are fully automated electric multiple units. Each single-deck train features two dedicated areas for prams, luggage and bicycles. There are three doorways per side per carriage and no internal doors between the carriages. In a 6-car configuration, the trains have a seating capacity of 378 people, with a total capacity of 1,100. Seating arrangements on the Alstom trains are longitudinal, following the style of most other metro trains. The trains utilise Alstom's trademark Urbalis 400 Grade-of-Automation signalling system that ensures that trains are capable of operating automatically at all times including door closing, obstacle detection and emergencies.

Before the introduction of services, a full-scale model of the new train was built for use on public display, including at the annual Sydney Royal Easter Show. The trains were built at Alstom's rolling stock manufacturing facility in Sri City, India, with the first six-car Sydney Metro train arriving in Rouse Hill in September 2017 to undergo testing.

In February 2018, dynamic testing on the first of the trainsets began. Testing was done on brakes, passenger information displays, lighting and door operation.

In 2019, an additional 23 6-car sets were ordered for the City & Southwest extension from the existing 22 sets, as of December 2024, all 23 sets have been delivered and are operational on the line.

==== Inspiro ====
For the Western Sydney Airport, Siemens will supply 12 3-car Siemens Inspiro driverless sets. These trains will enter service on the line from 2027, after the opening date of late 2026 was pushed back into December 2027.

=== Patronage ===
The following table lists patronage figures for the network during the corresponding year. Major events that affected the number of journeys made or how patronage is measured are included as notes.

Sydney Metro patronage by year
Year	2019	2020	2021	2022	2023	2024	2025
Patronage (millions)	14.2 (Note: Sydney Metro opened in May 2019.)	12.9 (Note: Patronage was lower than anticipated due to people staying at home and not taking public transport to school or work during the COVID-19 pandemic.)	11.4	16.3	22.6	39.9	72.0 (Note: Metro City section opened on 19 August 2024)
References							

2025 Transport for NSW patronage in Sydney by mode
Mode	Patronage	% of total
Metro	71,956,399	10.82
Train	284,972,638	42.84
Bus	242,983,455	36.53
Ferry	18,633,461	2.80
Light rail	46,640,237	7.01
Total	665,186,190	100.00

=== Ticketing and costs ===
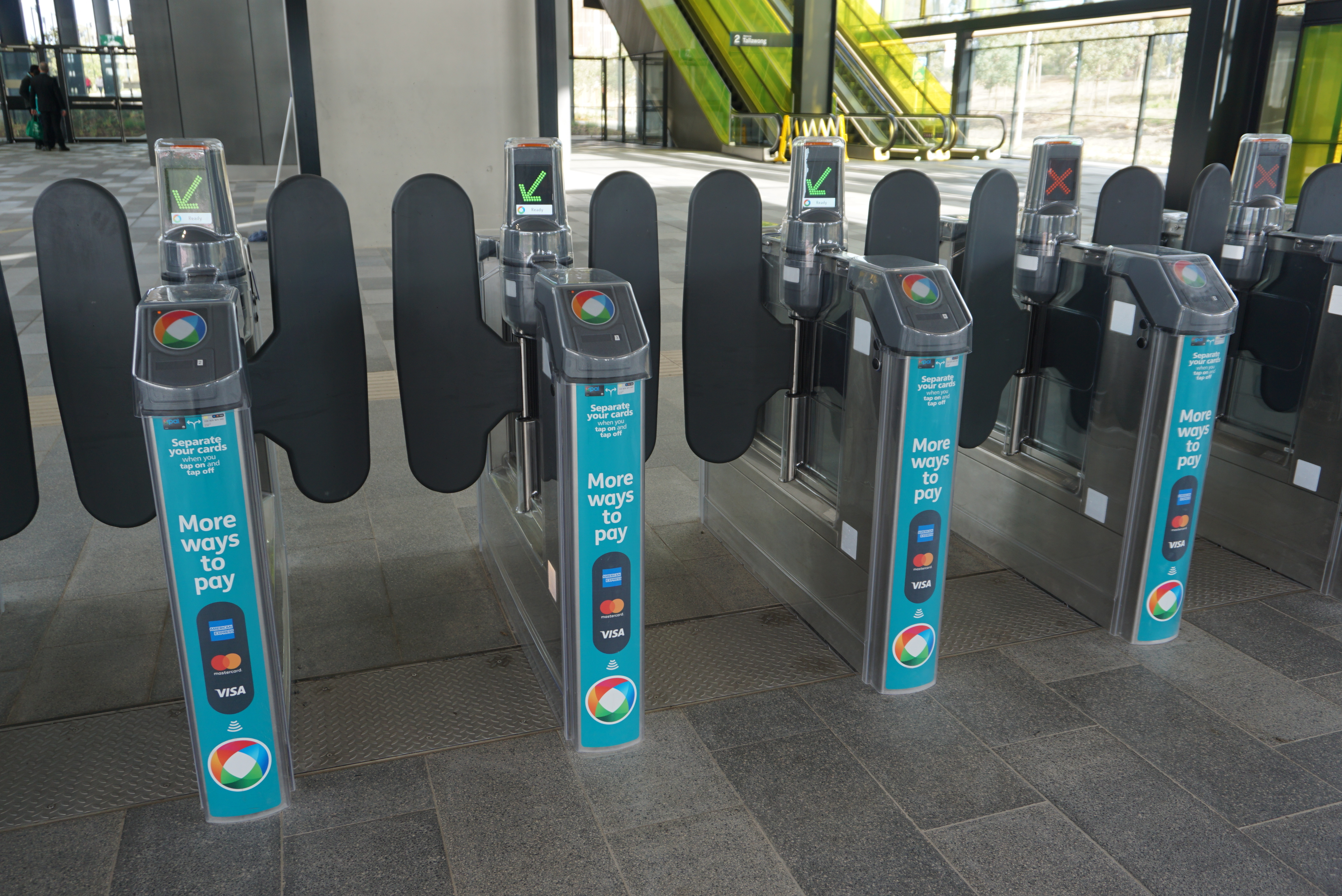
Ticket gates at Kellyville station

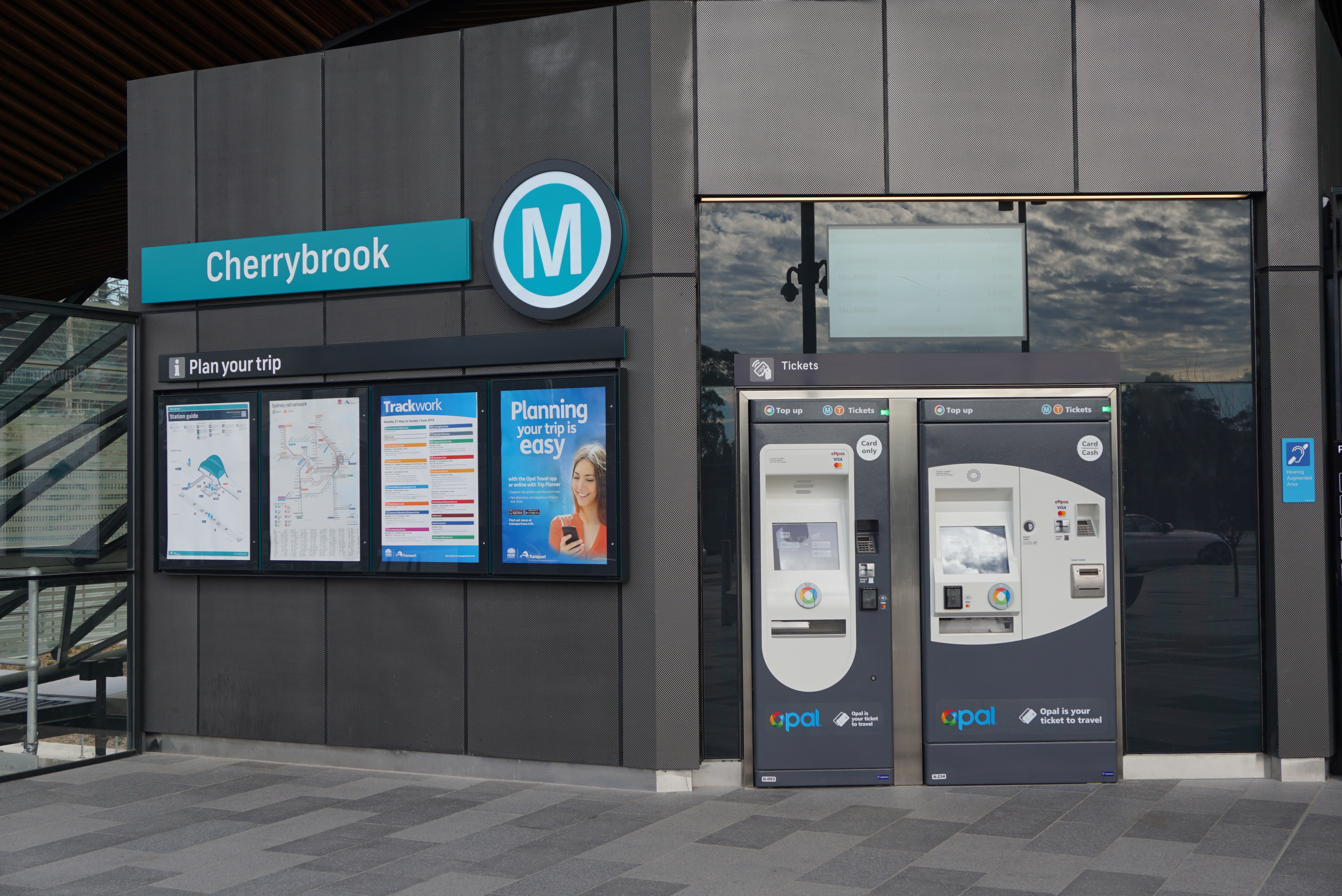
Opal Card top-up machines at Cherrybrook

Sydney Metro uses the Opal card ticketing system. The fare system is fully integrated with the Sydney Trains network and the NSW TrainLink Intercity network, trips involving suburban, metro and intercity services are calculated as a single fare and there is no interchange penalty. Students who use the Sydney Metro network to get to and from schools can apply for a free School Opal card. Opal is also valid on bus, ferry, and light rail services but separate fares apply for these modes. The following table lists Opal fares for reusable smartcards and single trip tickets:

Metro and train
As of 14 July 2025	0–10 km	10–20 km	20–35 km	35–65 km	65 km+
Adult cards & contactless (peak)	$4.33	$5.38	$6.20	$8.28	$10.66
Adult cards & contactless (off-peak)	$3.03	$3.76	$4.34	$5.79	$7.46
Other cards (peak)	$2.16	$2.69^	$3.10^	$4.14^	$5.33^
Other cards (off-peak)	$1.51	$1.88	$2.17	$2.89^	$3.73^
Adult single trip	$5.20	$6.50	$7.40	$9.90	$12.80
Child/Youth single trip	$2.60	$3.20	$3.70	$4.80	$6.40

^ = $2.50 for Senior/Pensioner cardholders

As there are no return or periodical options available, reusable Opal cards include several caps to reduce the cost for frequent travellers:

Fare caps
As of 14 July 2025	Adult cards	Other concession cards	Senior/pensioner cards
Daily Monday–Thursday	$19.30	$9.65	$2.50
Daily Friday, Saturday and Sunday	$9.65	$4.80	$2.50
Weekly	$50.00	$25.00	$17.50
Weekly airport station access fee	$36.36	$32.58	$32.58

== Project history ==
=== Sydney Metro Northwest ===
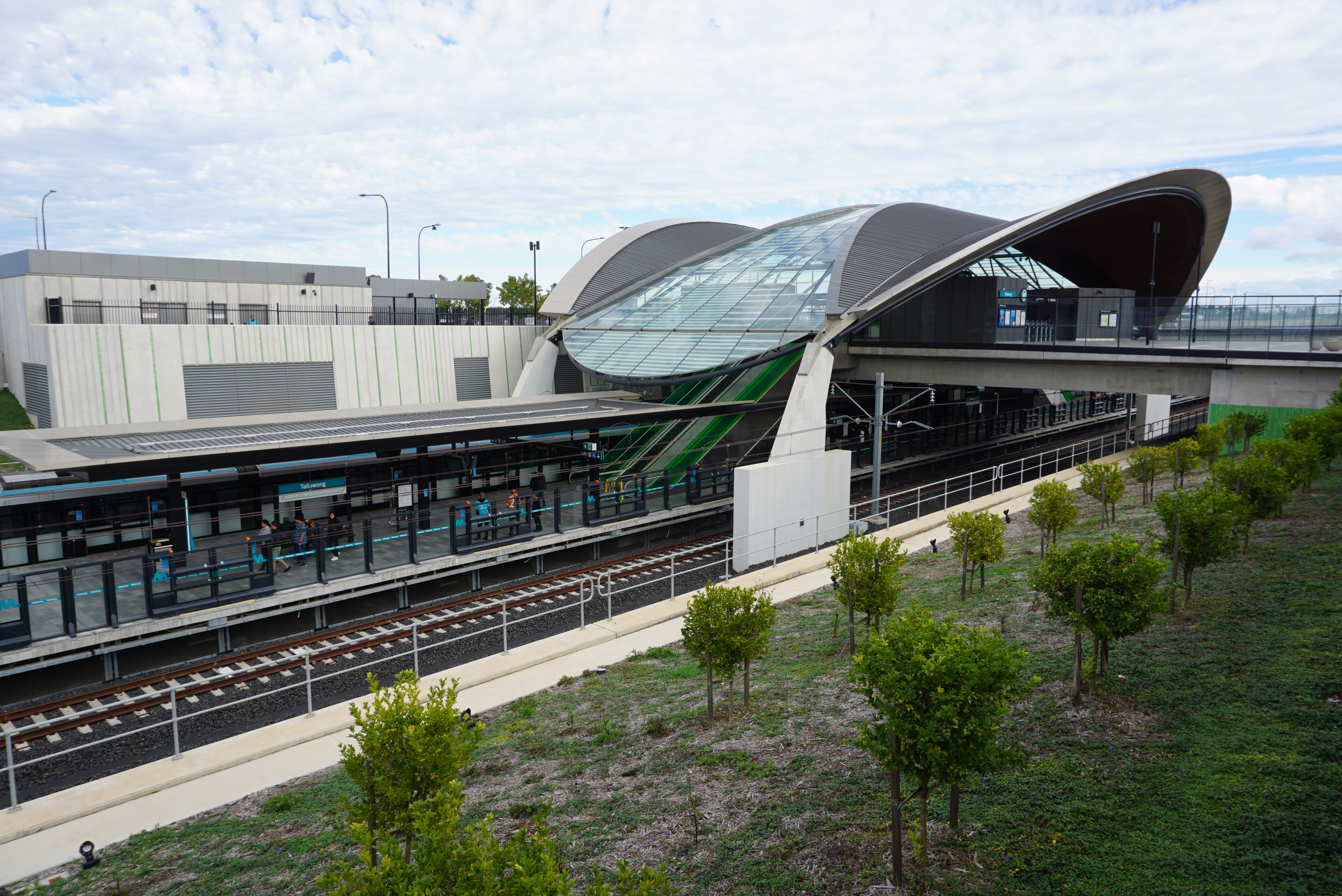
Tallawong station, the northern terminus of the current North West & Bankstown Line

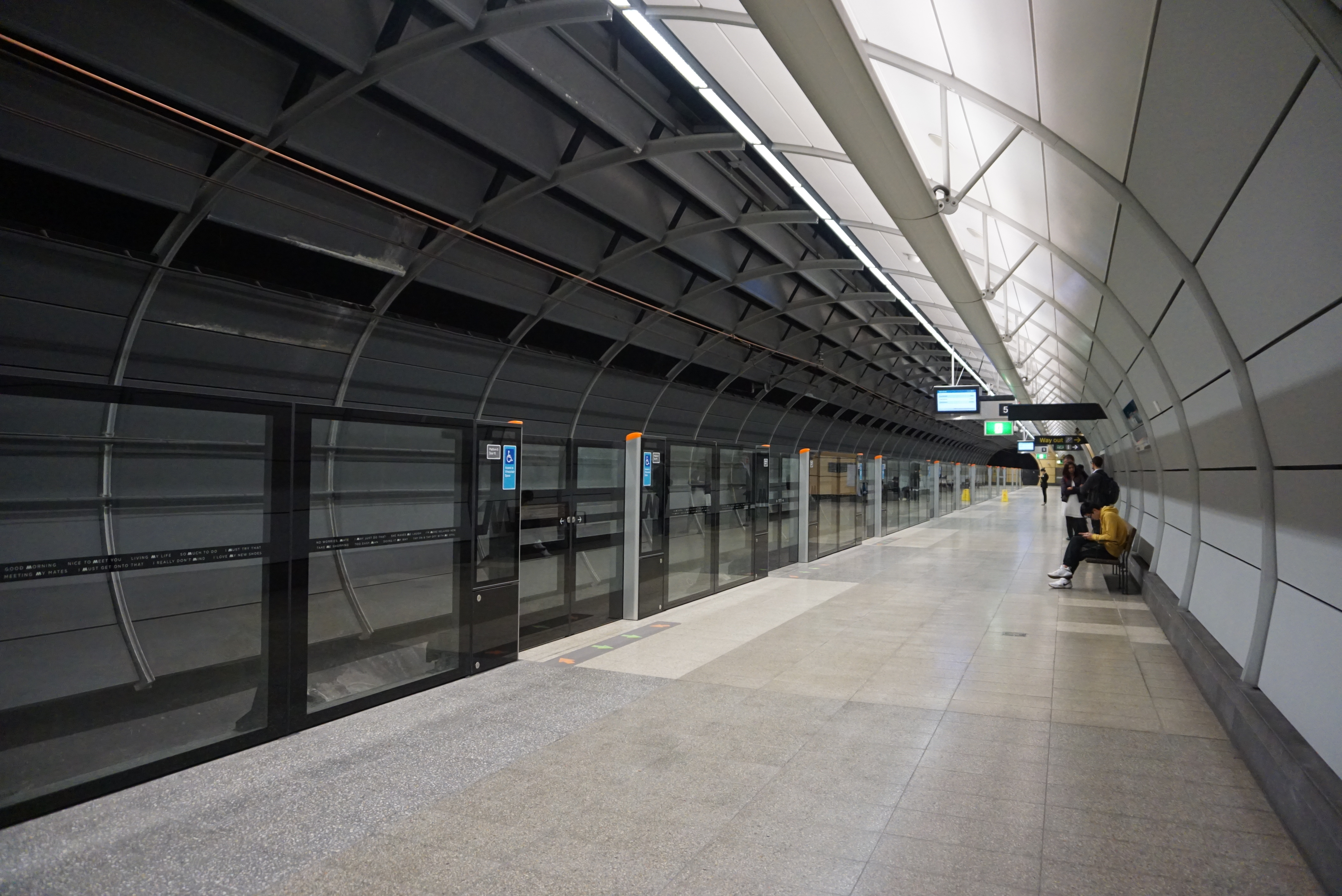
The Epping to Chatswood section of the North West Line was originally opened in 2009 as part of the Sydney Trains network and later converted to allow the operation of autonomous trains.

Construction of the first section of the M1 Metro North West & Bankstown Line began in late 2013, linking Tallawong, in Sydney's north-western suburbs to Chatswood. The line consists of 23 km (14 mi) of new track between Rouse Hill and Epping, which includes eight new stations. At Epping, the line connects to the existing 13 km (8.1 mi) Epping to Chatswood rail link, which was separated from the Sydney Trains network and converted to allow the operation of single-deck autonomous trains with platform screen doors. Passengers can interchange with the existing system at both Epping and Chatswood. The first section of the line opened in May 2019.

In November 2016, Sydney Metro, in particular, the John Holland Group, Dragados and Transport for NSW, were awarded the 2016 NSW Premier's Award for Building Infrastructure for the 15 km (9.3 mi) twintunnels in Bella Vista and Epping, which are currently the longest tunnels constructed in Australia. The completion of these tunnels in early 2016 marked the completion of the first stage of Sydney Metro Northwest. The NSW Premier's award recognises "infrastructure projects in the state that make a difference to the local community".

=== Sydney Metro City & Southwest ===
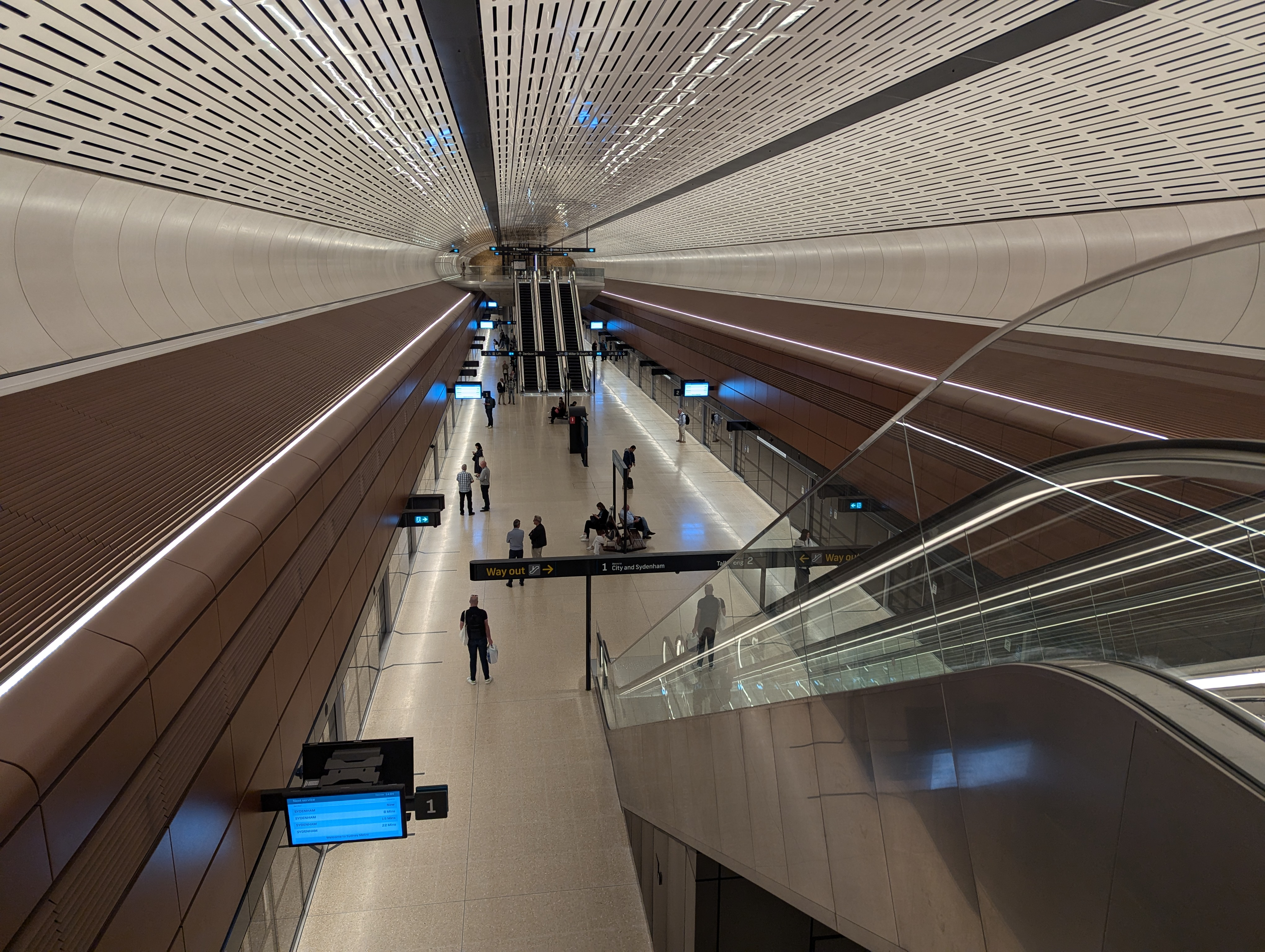
Victoria Cross Station on the City and Southwest section of the line

Construction of the extension of the M1 Metro North West & Bankstown Line began in mid-2017, extending the line an additional 30 km (19 mi) from Chatswood on the North Shore, through the Sydney CBD and to Sydenham. The centrepiece of the project is a new twin-tunnel rail crossing under Sydney Harbour. This new section of the line opened on 19 August 2024. From Sydenham, a second stage of the extension converted a section of the existing Bankstown railway line to rapid-transit standards, further extending the line to a final terminus at Bankstown. This final extension opened on 30 October 2026.

Together with planned improvements to the Main Western line, the project is expected to increase capacity on the Sydney rail network by up to 60%, and allow for the movement of over 100,000 extra commuters across the network every hour. The City & Southwest extension represents the first phase of the "southern sector conversion" envisaged in Sydney's Rail Future.

=== Sydney Metro Western Sydney Airport ===
In March 2018, the federal and state governments signed the Western Sydney City Deal and announced the development of stage 1 of the North-South Link as part of the deal. Stage 1 of the Western Sydney Airport line will operate between St Marys and Badgerys Creek Aerotropolis via Western Sydney Airport. Construction commenced in late 2020 and was planned to be complete to coincide with the opening of the new airport in 2026 however, it is now anticipated that the new line will not be ready until April 2027.

In the 2019–2020 federal budget in April 2019, the federal government announced a contribution of $3.5 billion to deliver stage 1 of the rail link. This funding includes $50 million towards the business case process for the North-South Rail Link and $61 million for the Elizabeth Drive overpass. In the 2019–2020 New South Wales state budget in June 2019, the state government announced an investment of $2.0 billion to begin the construction of stage 1 for the next 4 years.

This line will utilise a much higher voltage than that of the North West, City & Southwest lines, this time a single-phase alternating current at 25 kV 50 Hz. This means that the line will not be interoperable with the existing Sydney Metro or Sydney Trains network. This line will operate with a different class of rolling stock, manufactured by Siemens Mobility.

=== Sydney Metro West ===
Sydney Metro West is a separate line between the Sydney CBD and Westmead via Parramatta. The line was announced as an official project in November 2016, with up to 12 stations being considered including station locations at Parramatta, Sydney Olympic Park, Five Dock, the Bays Precinct and the CBD. In March 2018, the government announced that an additional station would be built at Westmead, as well as one that connected to either of the existing stations at Concord West or North Strathfield. This line would bring interchanges to the existing L4 light rail and other major heavy rail connections.

The 2019–2020 New South Wales state budget in June 2019 allocated funding of $6.4 billion over four years to the project, with construction to be fast-tracked to start in 2020.

The government announced and confirmed seven station locations along the line in 2019, with a further 2 stations announced in 2021. Tunnelling commenced in 2023 and completed in December 2025. The line is expected to completed by 2032.

== Potential extensions ==
=== Western Sydney ===
The North West line is proposed to be extended to St Marys to the west via Schofields, connecting to the Western Sydney Airport line and North Shore & Western lines. Previous plans have shown connections between the North West & Bankstown Line and Western Sydney Airport Line potentially occurring at either Schofields, extending both lines, or Tallawong, through extension of the Western Sydney Airport line. It will not be possible for the two lines to be connected as a single line due to incompatible train lengths and power systems; 1500V DC vs 25kV AC.

The Western Sydney Airport line is planned to be extended to the Airport & South Line at Macarthur and Glenfield to the south.

The West line would be extended from Westmead to the Bradfield Station or Western Sydney Airport.

=== South Western Sydney ===
The City & Southwest line is being planned to be extended from Bankstown to Glenfield via Liverpool, with a further potential extension to Bradfield Station via the existing South West Rail link that serves Leppington. The second phase of the southern sector conversion would see two of the four tracks between Sydenham and Hurstville, part of the Sydney Trains Illawarra line, converted to form part of the Sydney Metro network. This would increase rail capacity between Hurstville and the city by 10 trains per hour. Though a precise construction timeframe was not provided, the plan envisages all work being completed by 2031. The Hurstville conversion would add eight stations and 9 km (5.6 mi) to the metro network. Developing plans for this extension has proven difficult, and The Sydney Morning Herald reported in February 2016 that the project may have been dropped.

=== South Eastern Sydney ===
The South East Sydney Transport Strategy of the New South Wales government envisions a metro line starting from the CBD with stations at Green Square, Randwick, two at Maroubra, Malabar and La Perouse built by 2041, as well as another one from Randwick to Eastlakes and, via the Domestic and International terminals of Sydney Airport, further on to Brighton-Le-Sands and then Kogarah by 2056.

== In media ==
A Seven News documentary on the early construction of part of the Sydney Metro aired on the Seven Network in July 2016 titled World's Best Metro.

A multi-part SBS documentary on the tunnelling for the metro titled Sydney's Super Tunnel aired in 2020.

== See also ==
- List of Sydney Metro stations
- List of metro systems
- Light rail in Sydney
- Sydney Trains
