= John Laing (businessman) =

British entrepreneur (1879–1978)

Sir John W. Laing
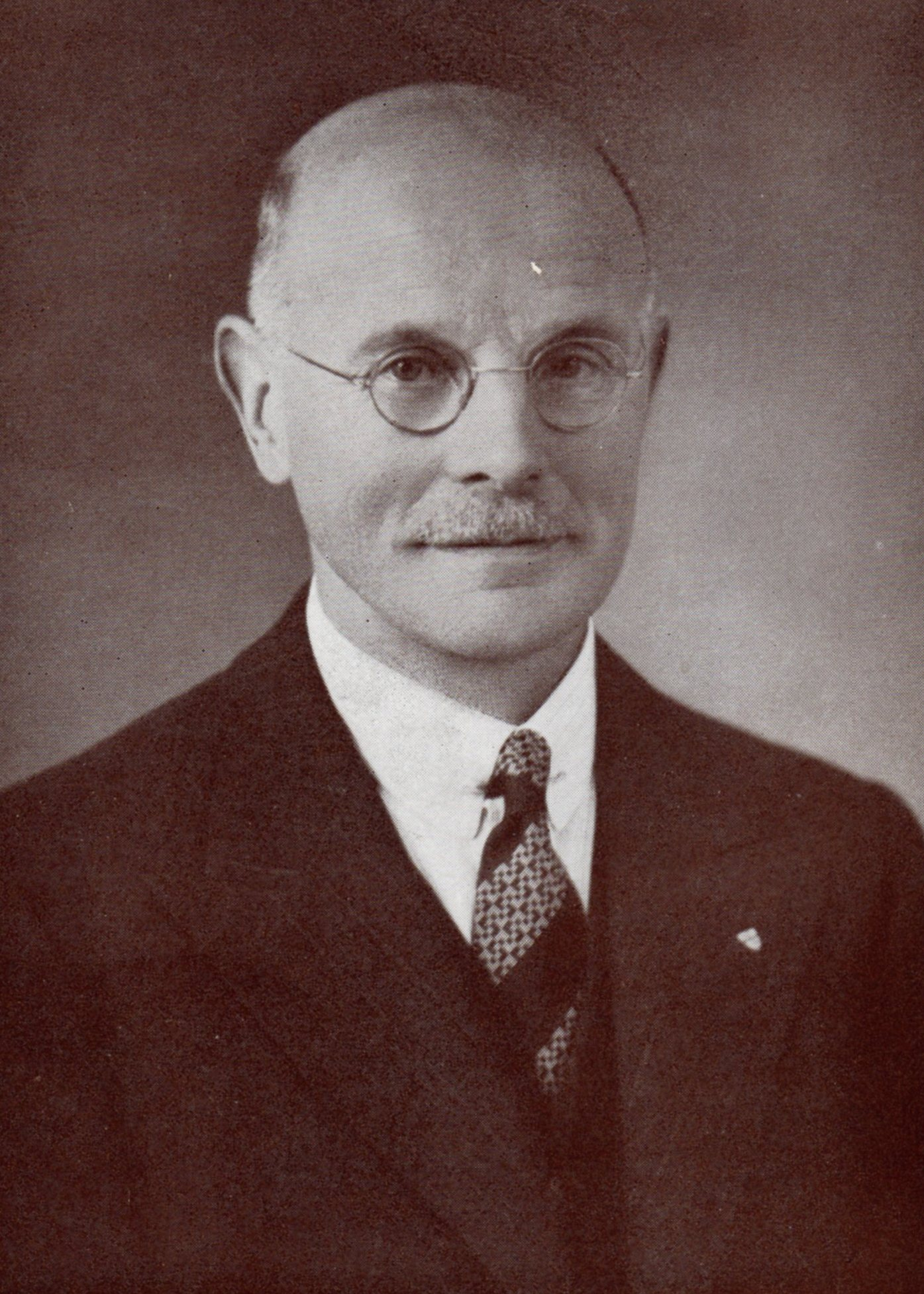
- Born: Sir John William Laing, 2nd Baronet; September 24, 1879; Carlisle, United Kingdom
- Died: January 11, 1978 (aged 98)
- Resting place: Mill Hill Cemetery
- Occupation: Businessman
- Children: Kirby Laing; Maurice Laing
- Relatives: Martin Laing (grandson)

Sir John William Laing CBE (24 September 1879 – 11 January 1978) was a British entrepreneur in the construction industry. He inherited his father's building business – which is now known as John Laing Group – in the early 1900s.

== Background ==
Laing was born in Carlisle to John Laing and Sarah Wood. His great-grandfather David Laing had come from Scotland to England in 1812 and lived in the Cumberland village of Sebergham. David Laing developed a family building business which prospered due to the boom in the country caused by the Franco-Prussian War of 1870. The war necessitated the construction of many new woollen mills in the local areas close to the Laings' business creating much work and a considerable growth in the value of their business. However the war time boom soon turned down and the Laings' construction business had no contracts. It was around this time that John’s mother and father converted to the Plymouth Brethren.

== Career ==
Laing followed his father, John, into the construction business, expanding it from a local building firm to open a London office in 1926. Under his leadership, the firm became a national enterprise that culminated in the rebuilding of Coventry Cathedral, whose consecration Laing attended in May 1962.

Laing gave the company its evangelical direction, which included pioneering ideas that nurtured staff, such as paid holidays, in the early part of the 20th century.

In 1922 he gave almost 40% of his shareholding in the business to a charitable foundation. He retired from the business in 1957, was knighted in 1959 and died in 1978, aged 98.

== Marriage and children ==
Laing married Beatrice Harland in September 1910. His sons William Kirby Laing and John Maurice Laing and his grandson Martin Laing continued the family business.

The John Laing Lectureship in the History and Theology of the Reformation was established in New College, Edinburgh, endowed by the Kirby Laing Foundation.

== Sources ==
- Cheyne, Alec (1996). Wright, David F.; Badcock, Gary D. (eds.). Ecclesiastical History. Edinburgh: T&T Clark. pp. 99–106. ISBN 978-0567085177.
- Coad, Roy (1979). Laing: The Biography of Sir John W. Laing C.B.E (1879-1978). Hodder & Stoughton. ISBN 0-340-23985-9.
- Harrison, Godfrey (1954). Life and Belief in the Experience of John W. Laing C.B.E. Hodder & Stoughton.
- Ritchie, Berry (1997). The Good Builder: The John Laing Story. James & James.
