= Rufford Foundation =

UK charitable trust

- Formation: August 2003
- Type: Charitable trust
- Legal status: Foundation
- Purpose: Conservation
- Headquarters: London, England
- Website: www.rufford.org

The Rufford Foundation, formerly the Rufford Maurice Laing Foundation, is a trust based in the United Kingdom that funds nature conservation projects by small or medium-sized organizations in developing countries.

== History ==
The present foundation was the result of a merger in August 2003 between the Rufford Foundation and the Maurice Laing Foundation. Sir Maurice Laing (1918–2008) established the Maurice Laing Foundation in June 1972, while his son John Hedley Laing established the Rufford Foundation in June 1982. The Maurice Laing Foundation used to support research into complementary health treatments. This is no longer an area of focus for the present foundation.

The Rufford Small Grants Foundation provides Rufford Small Grants for Nature Conservation. It was established in 2007, providing grants of up to £25,000 for small programmes and pilot projects in developing countries that conserve nature and biodiversity. John Laing founded both the Rufford Foundation and the Rufford Small Grants Foundation. In 1999 his Rufford Foundation began to support the annual Whitley Awards and in 2000 he became a founder trustee of the Whitley Fund for Nature.

== Grants ==
Most of the grants from the foundation go to nature conservation, the environment, and sustainable development in developing countries. The foundation also gives support to HIV/AIDS projects run by the Elton John AIDS Foundation. The foundation provides some funding to health and medicine projects and social welfare initiatives in the UK. In the year ending April 2011 the foundation earned £2.352 million and spent £2.666 million on charitable activities. Grants from the foundation average £20,000 – 50,000.

Nature conservation projects that received support from the foundation in 2010/2011 included:

- Bat Conservation Trust
- Botanic Gardens Conservation International
- Compassion in World Farming
- Environmental Investigation Agency
- Environmental Justice Foundation
- FIELD
- Fauna and Flora International
- Forest Research
- Global Canopy Programme
- Global Witness
- Last Great Ape Organisation
- Madagasikara Voakajy
- Orangutan Foundation
- Phoenix Fund
- Royal Society for the Protection of Birds
- Southern African Wildlife College
- TRAFFIC
- Whitley Fund for Nature
- Wildlife Conservation Nepal
- Wildlife Protection Society of India
- Wildlife Trust of India
- Zoological Society of London
