= John Laing Infrastructure Fund =

John Laing Infrastructure Fund (LSE: JLIF) was an investment fund company with a primary listing on the London Stock Exchange. Established in November 2010, the company acquired a Seed Portfolio of 19 low risk operational public–private partnership (PPP) projects from John Laing plc. In August 2018 the company agreed to accept an offer from Dalmore Capital and Equitix Investment Management valuing the company at £1.45 billion. The transaction became effective on 28 September 2018.
