= Releaf =

UK medical cannabis clinic

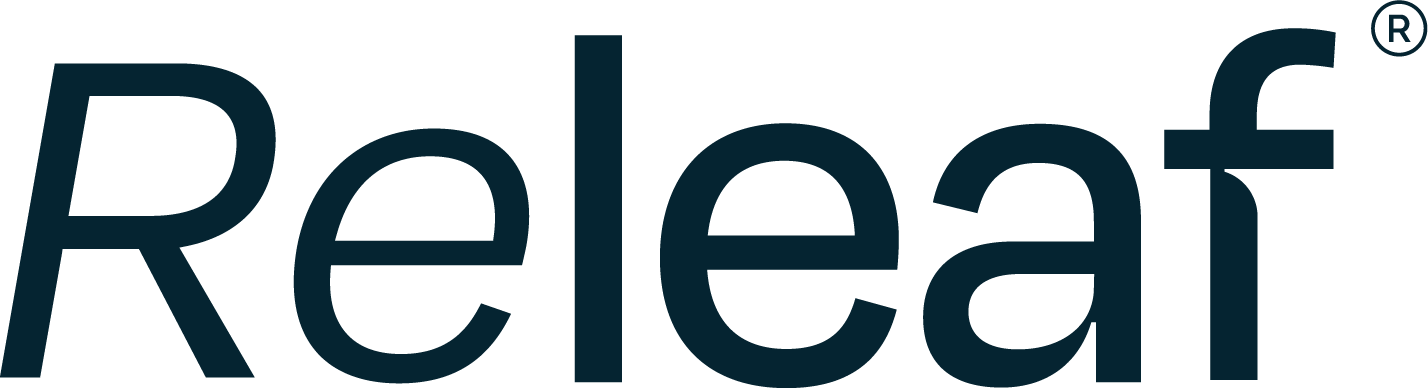
- Type: Private
- Industry: Medical cannabis
- Founded: 2022; 4 years ago
- Founders: Mason Soiza
- Headquarters: London, United Kingdom
- Area served: United Kingdom; Germany
- Key people: Tim Kirby (CEO)
- Products: Releaf Patient Platform; Releaf Medical Cannabis Card; Releaf Protect
- Services: Medical cannabis consultations Cannabis-based prescription medicines (CBPMs); Patient legal support
- Website: releaf.co.uk releaf.com

Releaf is a British medical cannabis clinic, licensed to prescribe and dispense cannabis-based prescription medicines (CBPMs) in the United Kingdom. It is based in London, England.

== History ==
Releaf Dispensary was founded in 2022 by Mason Soiza. In March 2023, Releaf raised £1.5 million in a funding round ahead of its commercial launch. Also, in 2023, Releaf joined the UK's Cannabis Industry Council as a clinic member.

In June 2024, Releaf formed a joint initiative with UK cultivator Glass Pharms to supply domestically grown medical cannabis flowers to patients.

In September 2025, Releaf acquired the domain name Releaf.com for £110,000. In October 2025, Releaf expanded its operations to Germany following 2024 regulatory reforms were passed.

In January 2026, Releaf launched Releaf Protect, a subscription legal guidance helpline for UK medical cannabis patients, in a joint initiative with Irwin Mitchell. As of March 2026, Releaf had over 25,000 patients and over £38m of revenue.

== Platform ==
Releaf operates a health technology platform that helps deliver prescription medicines to patients' homes via licensed pharmacies and can also be used for screening and online consultations. It is available through a monthly subscription, Releaf+.
