= Foresight Environmental Infrastructure =

British investment trust

- Traded as: LSE: FGEN
- Industry: Investment trust
- Founded: March 2014
- Headquarters: London, United Kingdom
- Key people: Stephanie Coxon (Chair)
- Website: Official site

Foresight Environmental Infrastructure, formerly JLEN Environmental Assets Group and John Laing Environmental Fund, is a British investment trust dedicated to investments in environmental infrastructure, including renewable energy generation, energy storage and sustainable resource management assets in the United Kingdom and mainland Europe. The chair is Stephanie Coxon.

Established in March 2014, the company is listed on the London Stock Exchange and is a constituent of the FTSE 250 Index.

== History ==
The company was established in March 2014. Foresight Group took over responsibility for managing the fund from John Laing Capital Management in June 2019. In August 2024, the company sold a 51% stake in a portfolio of six anaerobic digestion plants to Future Biogas for £68.1 million, and launched a £20m share buyback programme. Because the shares were trading at a significant discount to asset value, the company proposed holding a vote on discontinuation at its annual general meeting in September 2024. The discontinuation resolution was defeated, with 92.7% of votes cast against it.

The company changed its name to Foresight Environmental Infrastructure in September 2024.

In June 2025, the company set out a refreshed strategy focused on core renewable energy generation assets. Shareholders voted for the company to continue at the annual general meeting in September 2025, with 93.8% of votes in favour. The company completed a £30m share buyback programme in September 2025 and, in October 2025, changed its management fee arrangements so that half of Foresight's fee is based on the share price.

Ed Warner, who had been chairman since August 2022, stood down at the annual general meeting in September 2026 and was succeeded by Stephanie Coxon. In October 2026, the company sold its remaining 49% stake in the six anaerobic digestion plants to Future Biogas for £104 million.

== Operations ==
The company invests across three areas: renewable energy generation, which accounts for 71% of portfolio value, other energy infrastructure (11%) and sustainable resource management (18%). Its portfolio has included wind farms, solar energy farms and anaerobic digestion projects, as well as energy storage projects.
