= Laing O'Rourke =

Multinational construction company in the United Kingdom

- Type: Private limited company
- Industry: Construction, Civil Engineering
- Founded: 1978
- Headquarters: Dartford, Kent, England
- Key people: Ray O'Rourke (Chairman and CEO); Cathal O'Rourke (COO)
- Revenue: £3,638.0 million (2022/23)
- Operating income: £(81.5) million (2022/23)
- Net income: £(196.5) million (2022/23)
- Number of employees: 10,603 (2022/23)
- Website: www.laingorourke.com

Laing O'Rourke is a multinational construction company headquartered in Dartford, England. It was founded in 1978 by Ray O'Rourke. It is the largest privately owned construction company in the United Kingdom.

== History ==
The company was founded by Ray O'Rourke and his brother Des in 1978. Initially a specialist concrete subcontractor, it was originally based in East London, and was known as R. O'Rourke & Son. In September 2001, R. O'Rourke bought main contractor Laing Construction from John Laing plc for £1. Laing's construction business had been making significant losses, in part due to additional costs on the Cardiff Millennium Stadium project, the National Physical Laboratory, and No 1 Poultry in the City of London. The name of the company was changed to Laing O'Rourke.

In May 2004, the company acquired Crown House Engineering, a mechanical and electrical engineering business, from Carillion. Laing O'Rourke went on to expand its operations in Australia in July 2006, when it acquired Barclay Mowlem, also from Carillion. In 2015, the company became a member of the Housing and Finance Institute.

In December 2015, the chief executive officer of the company, Anna Stewart, stepped down with immediate effect due to ill health. Ray O'Rourke, the company's executive chairman, assumed her role although it was reported that O’Rourke could only spend a limited number of days in the United Kingdom, due to his tax exile status in Jersey.

On 11 January 2016, Laing O'Rourke announced that it had begun the formal sale process of selling its Australian business. This was a result of multiple unsolicited offers and a desire to invest more heavily in the company's operations in the United Kingdom.

In the year to 31 March 2016, the group made a pre tax loss £246m, after being hit by poor performance on its £1.3bn PFI hospital contract (at CHUM) in Montreal, Canada, and on several now completed problem contracts in the United Kingdom. In December 2016 it was rumoured the Australia arm has been taken off the market after Laing O’Rourke failed to find a buyer. The sale process was later discontinued and the Australian business was refinanced in 2017.

In March 2017, the company withdrew 800 of its workers from the Ichthys LNG storage tank project after not receiving payments from Kawasaki for its work for several months: the amount in dispute was $250 million although Kawasaki rejected claims that it owed the disputed money.

In the year to 31 March 2017, the group made a pre tax loss of £67m, largely due to losses of £81m (on revenues of just over £2 billion) at the largest operating division, Laing O'Rourke plc, mainly attributed to its PFI hospital contract at CHUM in Montreal, Canada. The contracting business then employed 8,539 people, more than half of the group's then 15,273 staff.

Publication of the group's results of 2018 was delayed due to "historic turbulence in the construction sector" following the January 2018 collapse of Carillion; in December 2018, the company said increased scrutiny from lenders and accountants was delaying a refinancing move, finally closed in January 2019.

With its operations refinanced in the United Kingdom, Laing O’Rourke published accounts for the year to 31 March 2018, showing the group made a pre tax loss of £46.5m (down from £60.6m in 2017) on turnover down to £2.93bn from £3.17bn.

In March 2023, Ray O'Rourke's son Cathal O'Rourke was appointed the company's chief operating officer. In June 2024, it was announced that Cathal would succeed his father as Laing O'Rourke CEO.

Laing O'Rourke accounts for the year to 31 March 2023 showed a pre-tax loss of £288m on total revenues of £3.4 billion (including £2.18bn turnover from its Europe operations and £1.13bn in Australia). In January 2024, it began company-wide cutbacks as financial analysts warned about the company's financial safety. People on sites across the group were served redundancy notices, including 60 at the Laing O'Rourke Centre of Excellence for Modern Construction (CEMC) at Steetley in Nottinghamshire.

== Operations ==
Laing O'Rourke has operations in two major geographic hubs, Europe and Australia. European operations span Abu Dhabi, Canada, Dubai and the United Kingdom. Australian operations cover Australia, Hong Kong, New Zealand and South East Asia The company operates in building construction, infrastructure construction, investment & development, modular manufacturing, engineering expertise and support services.

Its projects span a range of sectors including, building, transport, power, water & utilities, mining & natural resources and oil & gas.

== Major projects ==
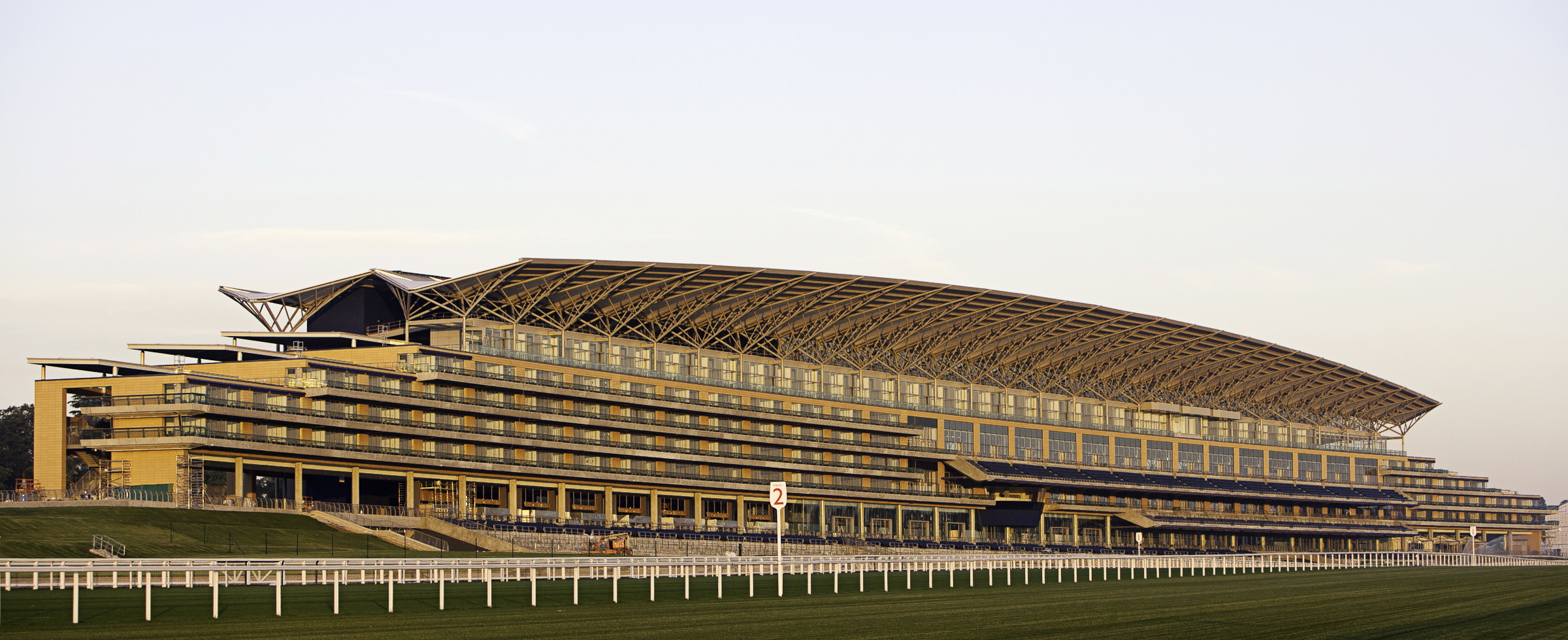
The new Ascot stand built by Laing O'Rourke to a design by Populous and Buro Happold; Completed 2006.

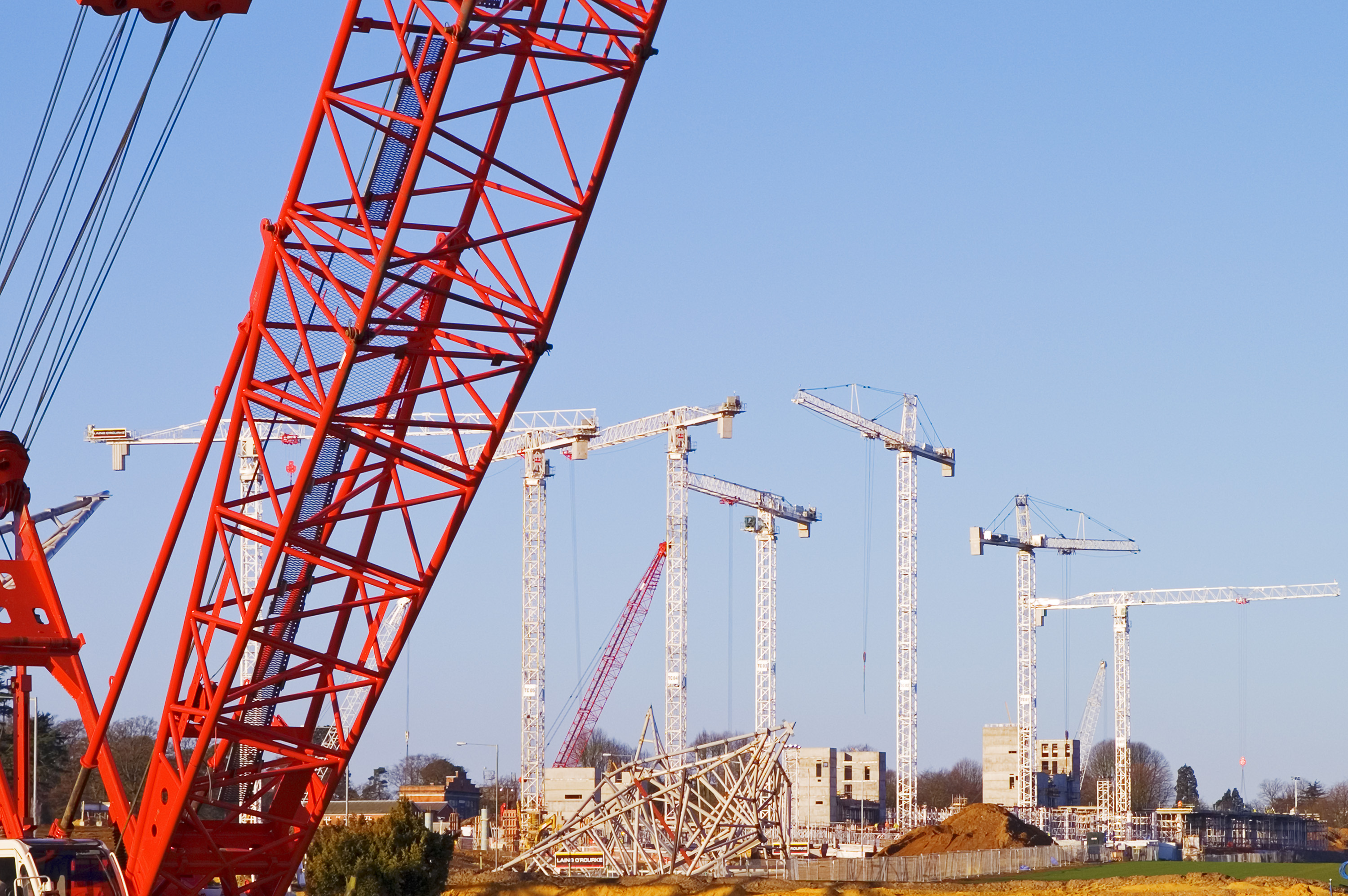
The company's tower cranes rebuilding Royal Ascot

Major projects involving the company have included;

- Ascot Racecourse, completed in 2007.
- Heathrow Terminal 5, London, England, completed in 2008.
- Darwin Convention Centre, Northern Territory, Australia, completed in 2008.
- Kwinana Power Station, Western Australia, completed in 2008.
- Atlantis, The Palm, Dubai, UAE, completed in 2009.
- Northern Centre for Cancer Treatment, Newcastle upon Tyne, completed in 2009.
- West Lothian Civic Centre, Livingston, completed in 2009.
- Great North Children's Hospital, Newcastle upon Tyne, completed in 2010.
- Darling Downs Power Station, Queensland, Australia, completed in 2010.
- One Hyde Park, London, completed in 2011.
- Tunbridge Wells Hospital completed in 2011.
- Roseberry Park Hospital, Middlesbrough, completed in 2011.
- Expansion of the Royal Stoke University Hospital completed in 2012.
- London Gateway Port, London, completed in 2013.
- The Leadenhall Building at 122 Leadenhall Street, London, completed in 2014.
- Heathrow Terminal 2, completed in 2014.
- Alder Hey Children's Hospital, Liverpool, completed in 2015.
- The Francis Crick Institute, London, completed in 2016.
- Centre hospitalier de l'Université de Montréal, Canada, completed in 2016.
- Redevelopment of the Dumfries and Galloway Royal Infirmary, completed in 2017.
- Redevelopment of Bond Street station completed in 2017.
- Al Raha Beach, Abu Dhabi, UAE, due for completion in 2018.
- Redevelopment of the Glan Clwyd Hospital, due for completion in 2018.
- Design and construction of the new Northern line extension to Battersea in London, due for completion in 2020.
- Completion of the Royal Liverpool University Hospital (previously a Carillion PFI project), originally due for completion in 2020 but delayed to 2022.
- Hinkley Point C nuclear power station, due for completion circa 2031.
- Redevelopment of the Royal Sussex County Hospital, due for completion in 2024.
- Redevelopment of the Brent Cross Shopping Centre in London, due for completion in 2022.
- Redevelopment of the Whiteleys Department Store in Bayswater, London, due for completion in 2023.
- Ellenbrook line, Western Australia, completed in 2024.
- Everton F.C. new stadium at Bramley-Moore Dock, due for completion in 2024.
- HS2 Interchange station, due for completion by approximately 2029.

== Controversies ==
=== Blacklisting ===
Laing O'Rourke and its acquisition of 2004, Crown House, were revealed as subscribers to the United Kingdom's Consulting Association, exposed in 2009 for operating an illegal construction industry blacklist. Laing O'Rourke was later one of eight businesses involved in the launch in 2014 of the Construction Workers Compensation Scheme, condemned as a "PR stunt" by the GMB union, and described by the Scottish Affairs Select Committee as "an act of bad faith".

In October 2016, Laing O'Rourke and the other construction companies admitted that the blacklist was unlawful and apologised to those damaged by it. In December 2017, Unite announced it had issued High Court proceedings against twelve major contractors, including Laing and Crown House.

=== Late payment ===
In April 2019, Laing O'Rourke was suspended from the UK Government's Prompt Payment Code for failing to pay suppliers on time. It was reinstated in November 2019.

=== Ipswich housing development ===
In January 2024, at a meeting of the Levelling Up, Housing and Communities Committee, Conservative MP for Ipswich Tom Hunt criticised Laing O'Rourke for doing what he described as a "shocking job" as design-and-build contractor for The Mill, a 327-home high-rise development in central Ipswich, completed in March 2009. Some homes have been deemed unsafe since 2013, when "gale-force winds caused damage and tore cladding from the tower"; cladding on the block was found to be unsafe a year later. Hunt said there were also "deep structural problems" and that over 200 of his constituents had been in limbo for years.

=== London housing development ===
In July 2026, Laing O'Rourke was sued by build-to-rent developer Get Living over defects in work on the Elephant Central scheme (completed in 2018) left the high-rise residential development in Elephant and Castle, south London, "not fit for human habitation".
