= Maurice Laing =

British businessman

Sir John Maurice Laing (1 February 1918 – 22 February 2008) was a senior executive of British construction company John Laing. He was the first president of the Confederation of British Industry in 1965–66.

== Early life ==
Laing was born in Carlisle, Cumberland, the younger son of John Laing. The family were strict Christian Brethren. Laing's father had been running the family construction firm, John Laing & Son, since 1910, and Laing worked for the firm in his school holidays. The headquarters of the business moved from Carlisle to Mill Hill in 1926, and Laing was educated at St Lawrence College, Ramsgate.

In 1935, aged 17, he began to work full-time with his father at the family firm. Meanwhile, his elder brother, William Kirby Laing, studied engineering at Cambridge University. After working as a trainee, he began managing the construction of new airfields and barrage balloon stations in 1938.

== World War II ==
Despite his reserved occupation, and against his father's wishes, he joined the Royal Air Force during World War II. He initially served in the ranks, and was a Leading Aircraftman when he was commissioned as a Pilot Officer, Royal Air Force Volunteer Reserve on 30 October 1943; he was promoted Flying Officer in April 1944. His wife's poor health due to tuberculosis delayed his training, but he qualified as a pilot in South Africa, and flew the second British glider across the Rhine.

== Business career ==
Laing returned to construction in 1945. The company was floated on the London Stock Exchange in 1953, and John Laing retired in 1957. Having climbed up the management structure of the firm, Maurice took the #2 position in 1966, supporting his brother Kirby as chairman.

The buildings and structures built by the firm ranged from the first 52 miles of the M1 – the first motorway in the UK – built in 1958 and 1959 to connect Watford and Rugby; through nuclear power stations; to the new Coventry Cathedral and London Central Mosque. Laing swapped positions with his brother in 1976, becoming chairman of the Laing Group. He separated the company's property division from its construction division, creating a separate company, Laing Properties, which was floated in 1978. He became the group's life president when he retired in 1982. Despite his opposition, the property company was taken over by P&O in 1992.

He was a member of the National Economic Development Council from 1962 until 1966, and was a director of the Bank of England from 1963 to 1980.

He was the last president of the British Employers' Federation in 1964. Following its merger with the Federation of British Industries and National Association of British Manufacturers, Laing was the first president of their successor, the CBI, in 1965. He was knighted in the 1965 Queen's Birthday Honours. He was also a governor of the Administrative Staff College and of the National Institute of Social and Economic Research, and president of the Federation of Civil Engineering Contractors. He was president of the London Bible College.

He was rear-commodore and a trustee of the Royal Yacht Squadron, president of the Royal Yachting Association, and admiral of the Royal Ocean Racing Club and of the Island Sailing Club based in Cowes. Because of this love of sailing and yachting, Maurice Laing donated a sum of money to the Ocean Youth Club (later the Ocean Youth Trust) in 1990 to build a boat to help educate young people and disabled members of society in the fine art of yacht sailing.

== Personal life ==
Laing married Hilda Richards in March 1940. He was survived by his wife and their son, John, who runs the Rufford Foundation, a private grant-making organisation.
