= Ray O'Rourke (businessman) =

Irish businessman

- Born: Raymond Gabriel O'Rourke; January 1947 (age 79); County Leitrim, Ireland
- Occupation: Businessman
- Known for: Founder and 55% owner of Laing O'Rourke
- Title: Chairman and CEO, Laing O'Rourke

Raymond Gabriel O'Rourke (born January 1947) is an Irish businessman, the chairman and CEO of the construction multinational Laing O'Rourke.

O'Rourke was born in January 1947. A native of County Leitrim, Ireland, he was raised in Corraleehan, near Ballinamore in South Leitrim. He runs the privately owned Laing O'Rourke with his brother Des (born 1950), and owns 55% of the company. O'Rourke "started as a 'pony boy' carrying muck out from under London as the Victoria Line was being constructed." His estimated net worth was €800 million as of 2015.

O'Rourke purchased the construction company Swift Structures, owned by his brothers-in-law, Jim and Matt Halligan from County Mayo. He then called in the receivers.

His son, Cathal, works for Laing O'Rourke, and in March 2023 was appointed the company's chief operating officer. In June 2024, it was announced that Cathal would succeed his father as Laing O'Rourke CEO from the beginning of July 2024.

== Honours ==
O'Rourke has honorary doctorates from the Dublin Institute of Technology, and Queen's University, Belfast.

In 2011, he was made an Honorary Knight Commander of the Order of the British Empire (KBE).
