= John Laing Group =

U.K. infrastructure company

- Formerly: John Laing & Sons
- Type: Private
- Industry: Infrastructure
- Founded: 1848; 178 years ago
- Headquarters: London, England
- Key people: Andrew Truscott (CEO)
- Parent: KKR
- Website: www.laing.com

John Laing Group is a British investor, developer and operator of privately financed, public sector infrastructure projects such as roads, railways, hospitals and schools through public-private partnership (PPP) and private finance initiative (PFI) arrangements. It was listed on the London Stock Exchange and was a constituent of the FTSE 250 Index before its acquisition by KKR.

The company has its origins in 1848, when James Laing and his wife Ann Graham embarked on a home construction venture in Cumberland before relocating to Carlisle. James' son, John Laing, took over the company and pursued larger contracts in the region. By 1920, John William Laing had taken charge and continued to expand the business; it became a limited company in 1920 and, two years later, established its headquarters at Mill Hill, London. Its activities during and after World War II, particularly in the reconstruction efforts, increased the company's prominence. In January 1953, John Laing & Sons was listed on the London Stock Exchange, at which point the business had roughly 10,000 employees. William Kirby Laing and John Maurice Laing, who had joined the company in 1950, jointly took over in 1957.

During the latter half of the twentieth century, the company diversified into road construction and built numerous power stations, while continuing to construct houses. In 1985, Martin Laing became the chairman and pursued further diversification; shortly thereafter, its home construction grew internationally, particularly in the Middle East, Continental Europe, and the United States. While the late 1990s were a time of rapid expansion for the business, profitability suffered, leading to job losses and the disposal of its construction division to O'Rourke for £1 in 2001, while the property development divisions were sold to Kier Group. Its house-building arm was also divested to George Wimpey during the following year. In place of construction, John Laing Group focused on PPP / PFI opportunities.

In December 2006, John Laing plc was acquired by the private equity arm of Henderson Group. A year later, the Laing Rail division, which had shareholdings in Chiltern Railways, London Overground Rail Operations and Wrexham & Shropshire, was sold to Deutsche Bahn. John Laing was part of the Agility Trains consortium that was awarded the Intercity Express Programme contract in 2012. In October 2013, the company sold its facilities management business to Carillion. The John Laing Environmental Fund was established in 2014. During February 2015, the company was listed on the London Stock Exchange again. In September 2021, KKR completed the acquisition of John Laing Group.

== History ==
The business can trace its roots back to 1848, when James Laing (born in 1816), along with his wife, Ann Graham, and some employees they had hired, built a house on a plot of land they had bought for £30 in Cumberland. The £150 proceeds from the first house financed the building of the next two houses on the same plot of land, one of which (Caldew House in Sebergham) was kept by the Laing family to live in. Both the family and the business later moved near Carlisle.

When James Laing died in 1882, his son, John Laing (born in 1842), took over the company. John began to undertake larger contracts, but opted to confine the business's activities to the Carlisle area. John's son, John William Laing, (born in 1879) was working for the business before he was 20 years old, and so it became John Laing & Son. By 1910, John William Laing was running the business. More employees were recruited, and larger projects were undertaken, including factory construction. During 1920, the firm became a limited company, and two years later moved its headquarters to a 13 acres (5.3 ha) site at Mill Hill in north-west London. During World War II, the company was one of the contractors involved in building the Mulberry harbour units. Its activities during the conflict, as well as in the immediate years of reconstruction following it, greatly bolstered the company's reputation.

In 1950, William Kirby Laing and John Maurice Laing, the fifth generation of the founding family, joined the company. John Laing & Sons was listed for the first time on the London Stock Exchange in January 1953; at the time, the Laing family, along with its trusts and charities, held the majority of the shares. John William Laing became the chairman, while his sons became joint managing directors. By this time, the number of employees was around 10,000, and every site had a quality supervisor. John William Laing retired in 1957. During 1964, the company acquired the rival civil engineering business Holloway Brothers.

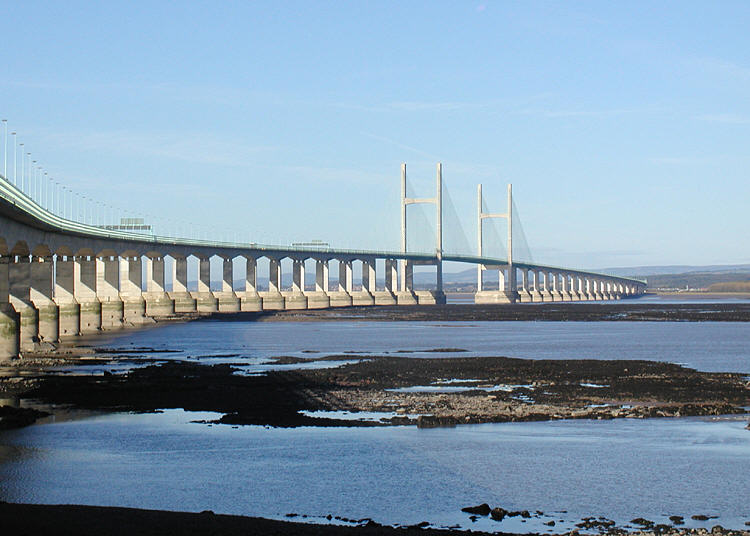
The Second Severn Crossing built by John Laing

Under William Kirby Laing and John Maurice Laing, the company continued to expand, winning contracts for power stations and diversifying into road construction while continuing to build houses. In 1985, Martin Laing, of the sixth generation of the founding family, became chairman. Martin Laing determined that the company should begin to diversify. Home construction in the United Kingdom, Saudi Arabia, Oman, the United Arab Emirates, Iraq, Spain, and California was now one of the major sources of the company's growth. During 1969, the company opted to invest in a toll road in Spain, marking its first infrastructure investment in 1969 in a toll road in Spain (the 65km Europistas project). Another milestone was attained in 1990 in the construction of the Second Severn Crossing, which was the first PPP to be conducted by John Laing.

During June 1995, amid the privatisation of British Rail, John Laing backed a management buyout that was the Chiltern Railways franchise. In early 1999, a controlling interest in Chiltern Railways was purchased.

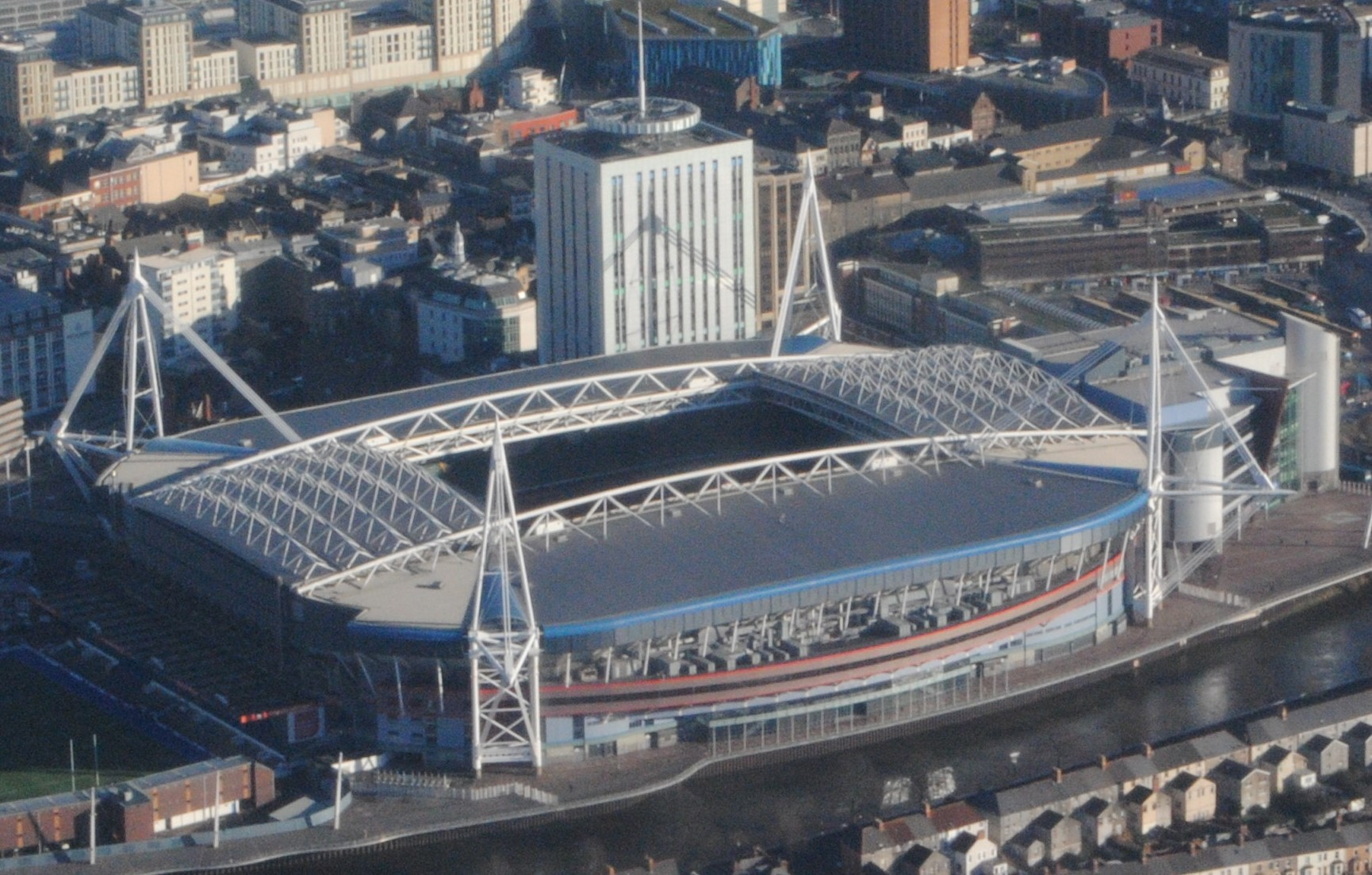
The Millennium Stadium, built by John Laing

During the late 1990s, the business expanded rapidly to the extent that, for the year ended 31 December 2001, its turnover exceeded £1 billion. However, as the company celebrated its 150th anniversary in 1998, it faced falling profits following significant losses on certain construction contracts (including the Cardiff Millennium Stadium, the National Physical Laboratory, a disastrous PFI scheme in Teddington, west London, and No 1 Poultry in the City of London), and sustained problems within its construction division related to competition and overcapacity. Accordingly, in 2001, the company cut 800 jobs, and disposed of its construction division to O'Rourke for £1, far less than the roughly £100 million that had been anticipated. Shortly thereafter, Sir Martin Laing stepped down as executive chairman in favour of Bill Forrester.

The business became orientated itself around its PPP / PFI activities; by 2002, it had structured itself into two main divisions, namely Homes and Investments. In April 2002, Laing's property developments divisions were sold to Kier Group, and its house building arm was also sold to George Wimpey later that same year. During 2003, its affordable housing division was sold via a management buy-out.

In December 2006, John Laing plc was acquired by the private equity arm of Henderson Group. During June 2007, a 50:50 joint venture between Laing Rail and MTR Corporation, London Overground Rail Operations, was awarded the London Overground concession. Several months later, the Laing Rail division, which by then operated Chiltern Railways and (jointly) London Overground, as well as held a stake in Wrexham & Shropshire, was put up for sale; the division was purchased by German rail operator Deutsche Bahn in January 2008.

In June 2008, John Laing in a joint venture with Hitachi and Barclays Private Equity formed Agility Trains to bid for the contract to design, manufacture, and maintenance of a fleet of long-distance trains for the Intercity Express Programme. The bid was successful, leading to a £4.5bn contract for new trains for both Greater Western and InterCity East Coast franchises being finalised in mid 2012. The company established the John Laing Infrastructure Fund in 2010 in a £270 million public launch; this entity focuses on the day-to-day operations of completed infrastructure. During October 2013, the company sold its facilities management business to Carillion.

In March 2014, Olivier Brousse was appointed Chief Executive; he actively pursued additional PPPs for infrastructure delivery and management services. The John Laing Environmental Fund was established in 2014 in a £174 million public launch. In February 2015, the company became listed on the London Stock Exchange again.

During September 2018, John Laing sold John Laing Infrastructure Fund Ltd. to Dalmore Capital and Equitix Investment Management. In June 2019, John Laing sold the Investment Advisory Agreement between John Laing Capital Management Ltd. and John Laing Environmental Fund Ltd. to Foresight Group CI Ltd.

In May 2021, KKR announced that it had agreed terms to purchase John Laing Group in a deal valued at about £2 billion. John Laing confirmed that it would unanimously recommend that its shareholders back the deal and that it considered the acquisition terms fair and reasonable. In September 2021, the transaction was completed.

== Significant investments ==
Significant investments include:

- The Intercity Express Programme, sold 2018
- The Greater Manchester Waste Recycling and Combined Heat & Power Programme
- The New Royal Adelaide Hospital
- The A1 Autostrada in Poland
- The Denver Eagle P3 Project

== Former operations ==
=== Laing Construction ===
John Laing’s former construction division, now absorbed into Laing O'Rourke, undertook some landmark projects, including:

- The Chapelhouse Reservoir completed in 1900
- Catterick Camp completed in 1930
- Shenley Hospital completed in 1932
- Warwick Hall in Cumbria completed in 1933
- Holme Moss transmitting station completed in 1951
- the Spelga Reservoir completed in 1957
- the Electra Building in Vancouver completed in 1957
- Government House, Victoria completed in 1959
- the M1 motorway completed in 1959
- Coventry Cathedral completed in 1962
- New Century House, Manchester completed in 1962
- County Hall, Durham completed in 1963
- the Bull Ring completed in 1964
- Carlisle Civic Centre completed in 1964
- Lanark County Buildings completed in 1964
- Westway completed in 1970
- Clifton Cathedral completed in 1973
- St Thomas' Hospital North Wing completed in 1975
- London Central Mosque completed in 1977
- the Freeman Hospital in Newcastle upon Tyne completed in 1977
- St David's Hall in Cardiff completed in 1982
- Mount Pleasant Airfield completed in 1986
- Borders General Hospital completed in 1988
- Newcastle Law Courts completed in 1990
- Stansted Airport Terminal Building completed in 1991
- Teesside Combined Court Centre completed in 1991
- Bradford Law Courts completed in 1993
- the Sizewell B nuclear power station completed in 1995
- Sheffield Law Courts completed in 1995
- the Second Severn Crossing completed in 1996
- Bridgewater Hall in Manchester completed in 1996
- the British Library completed in 1997
- No 1 Poultry in the City of London completed in 1997
- the Millennium Stadium in Cardiff completed in 1999
- the Joint Services Command and Staff College completed in 2000
- Norfolk and Norwich University Hospital completed in 2001

=== Laing Rail ===
The subsidiary Laing Rail owned and operated Chiltern Railways and was a joint operator of London Overground (with MTR Corporation) and Wrexham & Shropshire (with Renaissance Trains). In 2008, Laing Rail was sold to Deutsche Bahn.

== Musical references ==
Along with Sir Robert McAlpine and George Wimpey, Laing is mentioned in the opening preamble to Dominic Behan's 1960 satirical Irish ballad, "McAlpine's Fusiliers". It is also mentioned in another Dominic Behan song, "Building Up and Tearing England Down" (sometimes called "Paddy on the Road").

== Sources ==
- Hartcup, Guy (2011). Code Name Mulberry: The Planning, Building and Operation of the Normandy Harbours. Pen & Sword Military. ISBN 978-1848845589.
- Ritchie, Berry (1997). The Good Builder: The John Laing Story. James & James.
