= Lang =

Lang may refer to:

- Lang (surname), a surname of independent Germanic or Chinese origin

== Places ==
=== Antarctica ===
- Lang Island (Antarctica), East Antarctica
- Lang Nunatak, Antarctica
- Lang Sound, Antarctica

=== Australia ===
- Lang Park, a stadium in Brisbane, Australia
- Lang, New South Wales, a locality in Australia
- Division of Lang, a former Australian electoral division.
- Electoral district of Sydney-Lang, a former New South Wales electoral division.

=== Iran ===
- Lang, Iran, a village in Gilan Province, Iran
- Lang Varkshi, Khuzestan Province, Iran

=== Vietnam ===
- Lang Chánh District, a district
- Lang Trang, a cave formation

=== Elsewhere ===
- Lang, Austria, a town in Leibniz, Styria, Austria
- Lang, Saskatchewan, Canada, a village
- Lang County, or Nang County, Tibet, China
- Lang Island, Sunda Strait, Indonesia, an island
- Lang Glacier, Bernese Alps, Valais, Switzerland
- Lang Suan District, southern Thailand
- Lang, Georgia, United States

== Computing ==
- S-Lang, a programming language created in 1992
- LANG, environment variable in POSIX standard that sets multiple locale parameters
- The LANG attribute in HTML, for identifying the language of content

== Other uses ==
- "Langue", Ferdinand de Saussure's linguistic term for "competency" or "I-language" (both Chomsky), referring to a cognitive "language" as distinct from surface forms—natural spoken language
- Lang, variety of the jujube tree, whose fruits have a thicker skin compared to the fruits of other varieties
- Lang Film, a film and TV production company in Freienstein, Switzerland
- Lang Law, the informal name given to French law relating to book prices
- Lang Propellers, British company specializing in aircraft propellers
- Lang School, U.S. private school for gifted students, New York City
- Lang Syne Plantation, U.S. plantation near St. Matthews, Calhoun County, South Carolina
- Lang Van, a Vietnamese production company in Westminster, CA and Ho Chi Minh City
- Battle of Lang Vei, Vietnam War

== See also ==
- Langs (disambiguation)
- Lange (disambiguation)
- Laing (disambiguation)
- Langham (disambiguation)
- Langton (disambiguation)
- Langland (disambiguation)
