= Langham =

Langham may refer to:

== Places ==
=== Canada ===
- Langham Square, Ontario
- Langham, Saskatchewan

=== England ===
- Langham Place, London
- Langham, Dorset
- Langham, Essex
- Langham, Norfolk
- Langham, Northumberland
- Langham, Rutland
- Langham, Somerset
- Langham, Suffolk

=== United States ===
- The Langham (apartment building), an apartment building in New York City, United States
- Langham Creek High School
- Langham Island

=== Hong Kong ===
- Langham Place

== Hotels ==
- Langham Hotels International, a group which runs various hotels including:
  - Langham Hotel, London
  - Langham Hotel Hong Kong at Langham Place, Hong Kong - rebranded as Cordis in 2015
  - The Langham Huntington, Pasadena, California
  - The Langham, Melbourne
  - The Langham, New York
  - Langham Hotel Boston

== Other ==
- Langham Estate, a property estate in Fitzrovia, London, United Kingdom
- Langham Industries, a British company
- Langham Partnership, a nonprofit Christian international fellowship
- RAF Langham, an English military airbase during WWII
- Langham Hospitality Group
- Langham letter
- Langham Research Centre
- Langham Partnership
- Langham (surname)
- Chris Langham
- Wallace Langham

== See also ==
- Langham House (disambiguation)
- Langham Place (disambiguation)
- Lang (disambiguation)
- Langton (disambiguation)
- Langland (disambiguation)
