= The Speyer School =

School for gifted education in New York City, United States

Note: this article is about two distinct but related schools for gifted education in New York City, USA: the Speyer Legacy School (founded 2009, ongoing), and the Speyer School (1935-1941). The present-day school is named after the earlier one, and takes its inspiration from the approach to gifted education that was developed there.

== The Speyer School (1935-1941) ==
The Speyer School

Information
- Established: 1935
- Closed: 1941

The Speyer School (1935-1941) was started in a building at Columbia's Teachers College and named after financier James Speyer. It became well known between 1935-39 when it was used a "laboratory" to study how children perform when separated by educational ability. There were seven classrooms with 175 students, who had an IQ range on the Stanford Binet test of between 75-90 and two classrooms with students that tested at the level of 130+ on the same IQ test.

The experiment was led by Leta Stetter Hollingworth, an American psychologist who specialized in education and who is credited with writing the first textbook on gifted children. The results of the several studies conducted by Hollingworth dispelled many myths about exceptional children and suggested that many exceptionally gifted children suffer adjustment problems due to two factors: inept treatment by adults and lack of intellectual challenge. Her work also made "emotional education" an important part of the original Speyer School curriculum.

== The Speyer Legacy School (2009-present) ==
The Speyer Legacy School

Location
- 925 9th Ave; New York City, NY, 10019

Information
- Type: Independent school
- Established: 2009
- Founders: Malena Belafonte, Jennifer Dima, Jacqueline Haberfeld, Kelly Posner, Jennifer Selendy
- Head of school: Kirsty Montgomery
- Grades: K-8
- Enrollment: 317 (as of Aug. 2022)
- Website: www.speyerschool.org

The Speyer Legacy School is an independent (i.e. private) K-8 school in Manhattan, specializing in the education of gifted children. It was founded in 2009 and named after the original Speyer School. It is located in the West side of midtown Manhattan, at 925 9th Ave.

The school describes itself as the only K-8 independent school for gifted learners in NYC. In the public sector, K-8 schools in NYC specializing in gifted and talented education include the Anderson School and the Talented and Gifted School for Young Scholars. A different private school, the Lang School, provides K-7 education for "twice exceptional" children, i.e. gifted children with special needs such as ADHD or autism.

In 2022, the school was listed as having an annual revenue of 19 million dollars and as having 317 children enrolled.

In 2026, 90% of teachers at Speyer Legacy School had one or more Master's degrees, at least 340 students attended Speyer, and over 60% of students came from diverse ethnic backgrounds.

=== Academics ===
The school has received recognition in the areas of debating, chess and mathematics. The curriculum incorporates math at an accelerated pace, where students are offered different math cohorts tailored to their pace. Some students have completed Calculus by eight grade. They also have a math team that has competed and done well in numerous competitions such as the NOETIC, MOEMS, Mathcounts, and the NYC Math League. Its practice of teaching a debate class from Kindergarten onwards was the focus of an article in The Wall Street Journal. In chess, Brewington Hardaway, then a seventh grader at the school, tied for first place in the 2022 National Middle School (K-8) Chess Championship, and its Kindergarten and 2nd-grade teams won their grade-level sections in the 2021 National K-12 Grade Championships. An 11-year-old student at the school published two books about chess and has been featured in the international press and on Good Morning America. The school's math team won the Manhattan-wide branch of the Mathcounts competition in 2024 and 2025. Grammy Award winner Tim Kubart started working at the school as a music teacher in 2025. The school also has an ongoing literary magazine named "The Dragon's Hoard," where students can contribute to the magazine as an elective.

=== Notable alumni ===
Brewington Hardaway, who became a chess Grandmaster at age 16, attended the Speyer School.
