= Parish of Sturt =

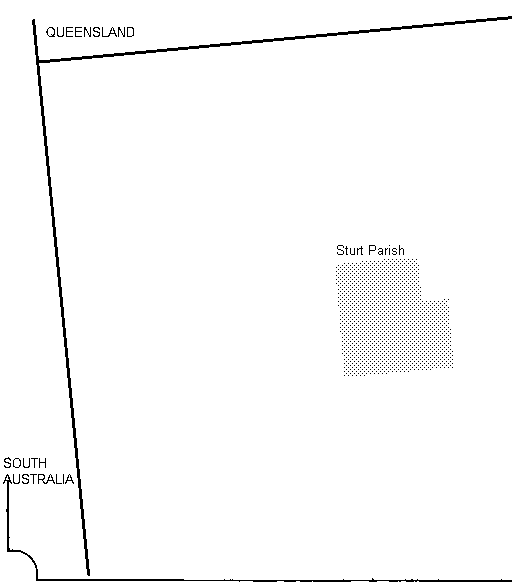
Sturt Parish Pool County (NSW)

Sturt Parish is a remote civil parish of Poole County in far North West New South Wales, located at 29.433056°S 141.519722°E.

== Geography ==
The Geography, of Sturt is mostly the flat, arid landscape of the Channel Country. The nearest town is Tibooburra to the east, which is on the Silver City Highway and lies south of the Sturt National Park.

== History ==
The Parish is on the traditional lands of the Wadigali and to a lesser extent Karenggapa, Aboriginal peoples.

Charles Sturt camped at nearby Preservation Creek (Mount Poole) for six months during 1845, and in 1861 the Burke and Wills expedition passed to the east, through what is now the Pindera Aboriginal Area.

Gold was discovered nearby in the 1870s.
