= Parish of Fort Grey =

Australian remote civil parish

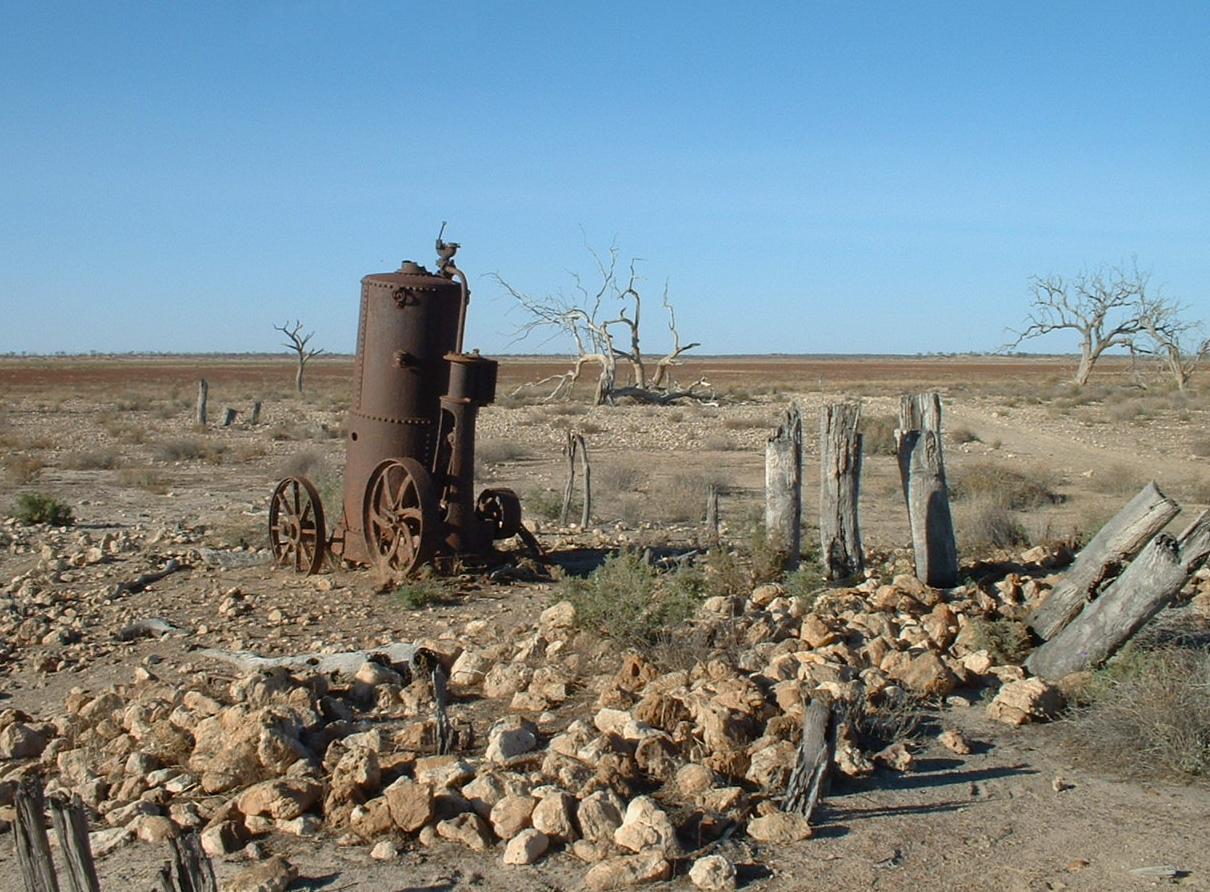
Country around Fort Grey.

Fort Grey is a remote civil parish of Poole County in far North West New South Wales. located at 29.1731°S 141.0307°E.

== Geography ==
The geography of Fort Grey is mostly the flat, arid landscape of the Channel Country but includes Lake Pinaroo.

The parish is to the west of the Silver City Highway and lies entirely within the Sturt National Park.

The Queensland-New South Wales border forms the northern boundary of the parish, which is marked by The Dingo Fence. The parish has a Köppen climate classification of BWh (Hot desert). The County is barely inhabited with a population density of less than 1 person per 150 km² and the landscape is a flat arid scrubland.

== History ==
The Parish is on the traditional lands of the Wandruwandha Aboriginal peoples.

Charles Sturt passed by the parish during 1845, and camped in the Fort Grey during 1845. Alan Moorehead described Sturt expedition in his novel Cooper's Creek.

In 1861 the Burke and Wills expedition passed to the east, through what is now the Pindera Aboriginal Area.

Gold was discovered nearby in the 1870s, and the miners were soon followed by pastoralists.

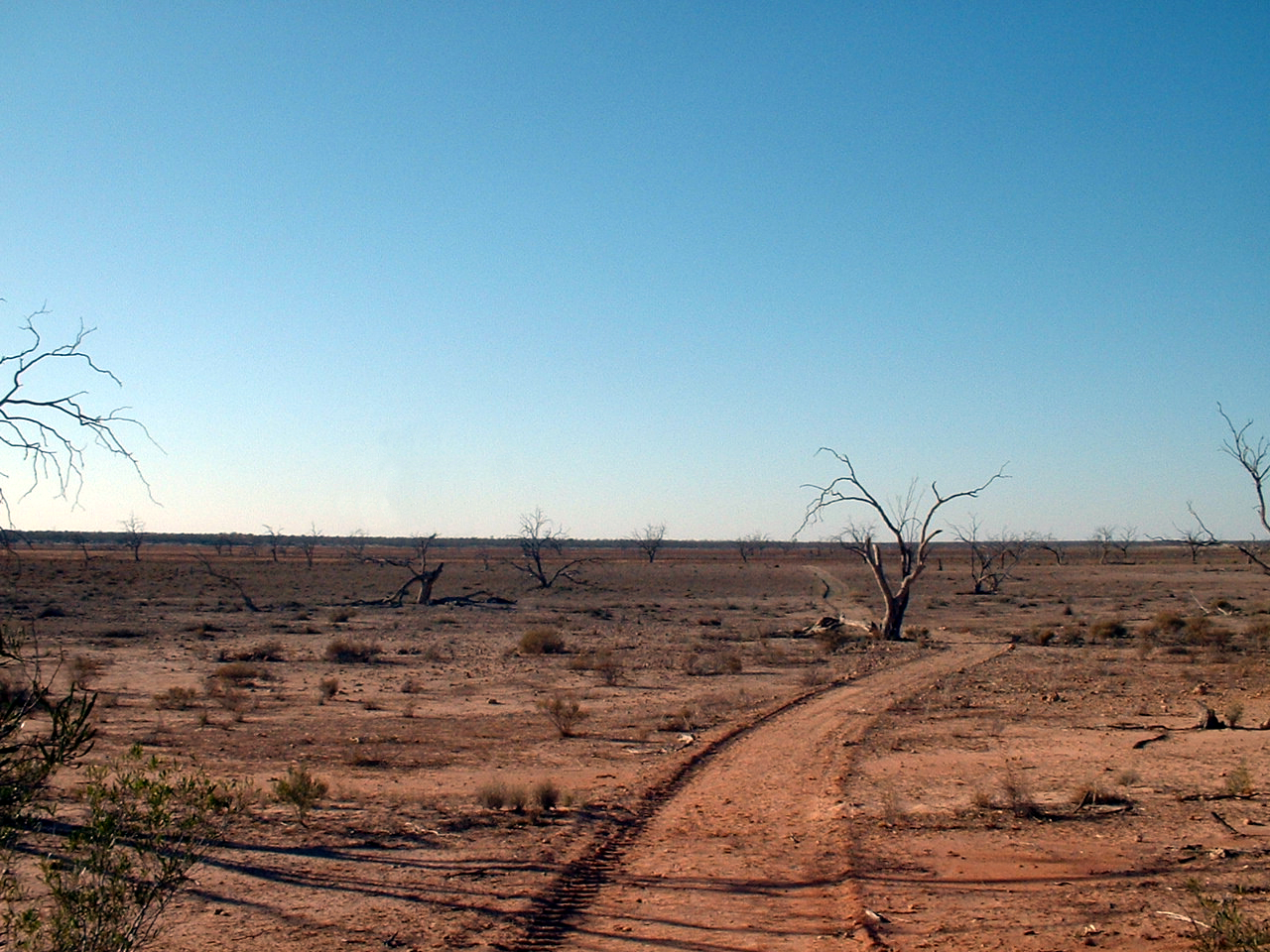
Landscape of Fort Grey

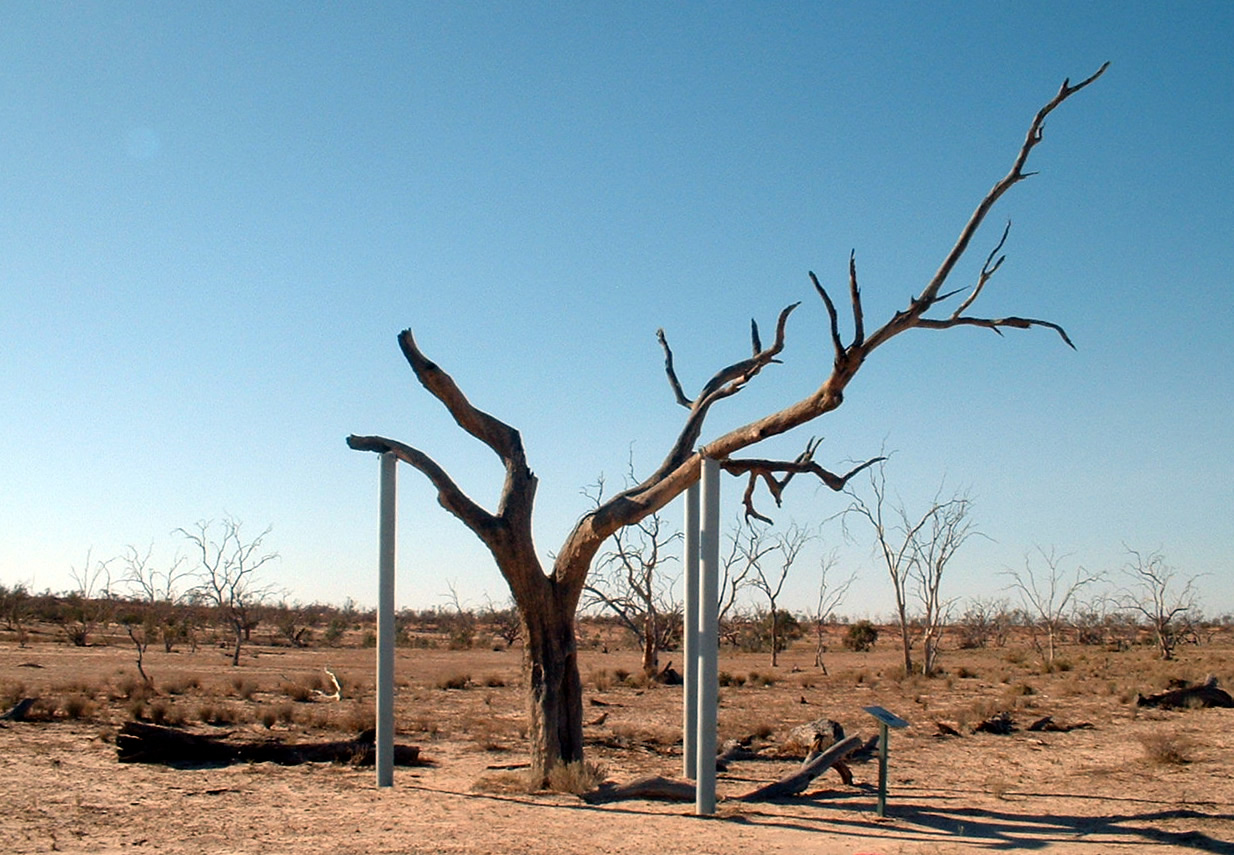
The Sturt Tree, marked by Charles Sturt on his exploration

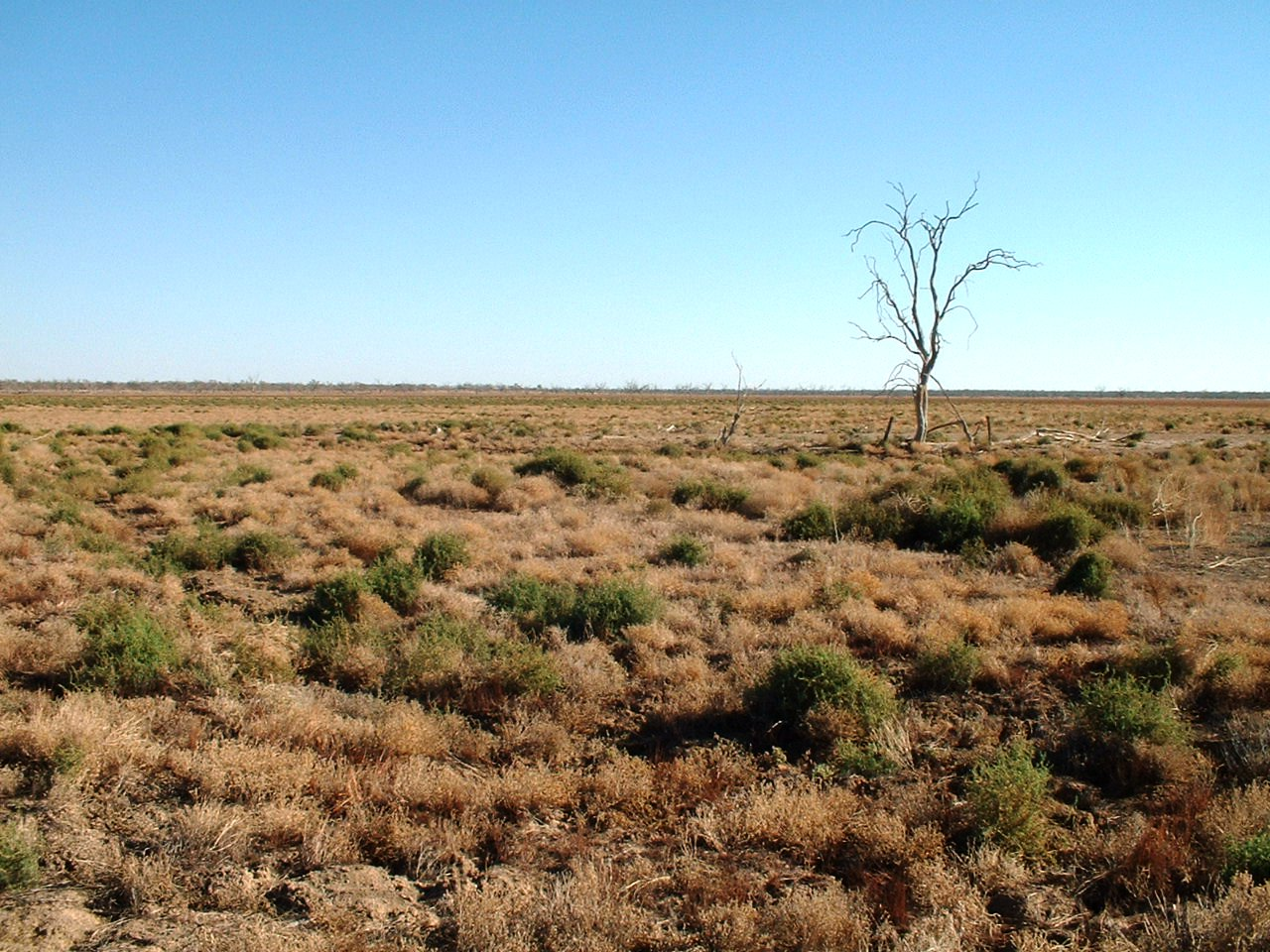
Dry bed of Lake Pinaroo

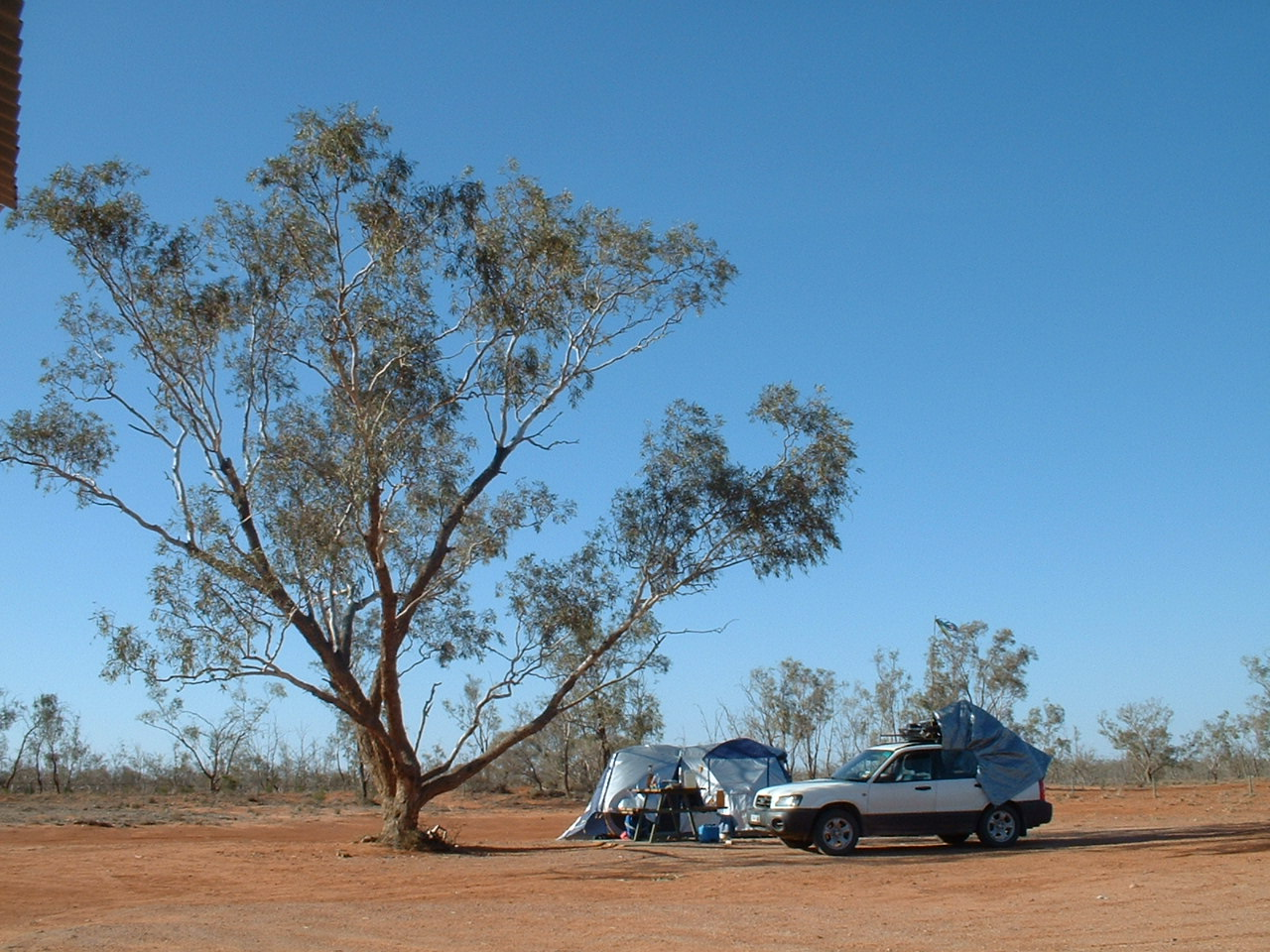
Camping site Fort Grey.
