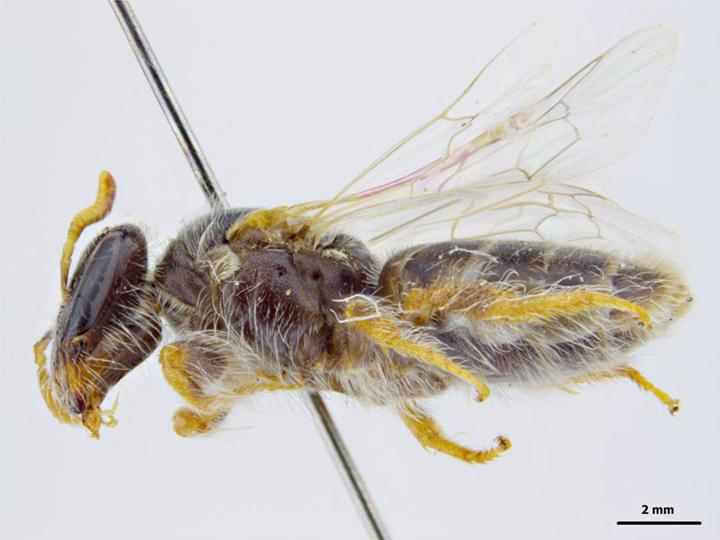
- Female

Scientific classification
- Kingdom: Animalia
- Phylum: Arthropoda
- Clade: Pancrustacea
- Class: Insecta
- Order: Hymenoptera
- Family: Colletidae
- Genus: Euhesma
- Species: E. sturtiensis

Binomial name
- Euhesma sturtiensis (Exley, 1998)

Synonyms
- Euryglossa (Euhesma) sturtiensis Exley, 1998

= Euhesma sturtiensis =

Species of bee

Euhesma sturtiensis, or Euhesma (Euhesma) sturtiensis, is a species of bee in the family Colletidae and the subfamily Euryglossinae. It is endemic to Australia. It was described in 1998 by Australian entomologist Elizabeth Exley.

== Etymology ==
The specific epithet sturtiensis refers to the species of Eremophila on which some type specimens were collected.

== Description ==
Body length of the female is 5.0 mm, wing length 4.0 mm; that of the male is body length 4.0 mm, wing length 3.0 mm. Colouration is mainly black, dark brown and yellow.

== Distribution and habitat ==
The species occurs in central Australia. The type locality is 30 km along the Haasts Bluff Road from Alice Springs, in the south of the Northern Territory. It has also been recorded from Queensland.

== Behaviour ==
The adults are flying mellivores. Flowering plants visited by the bees include Eremophila sturtii.

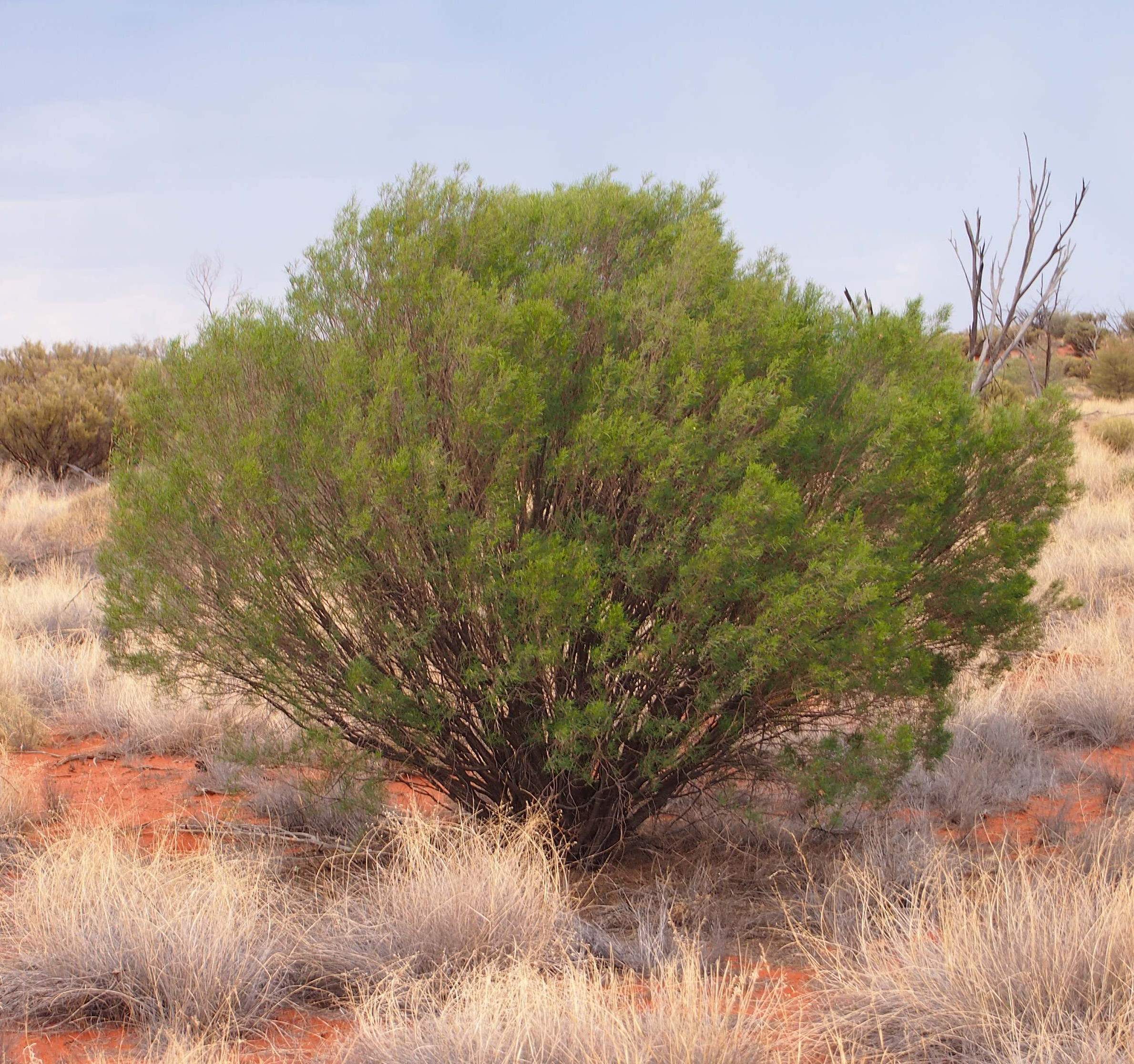
Eremophila sturtii, or turpentine bush, a favoured forage plant of the bees

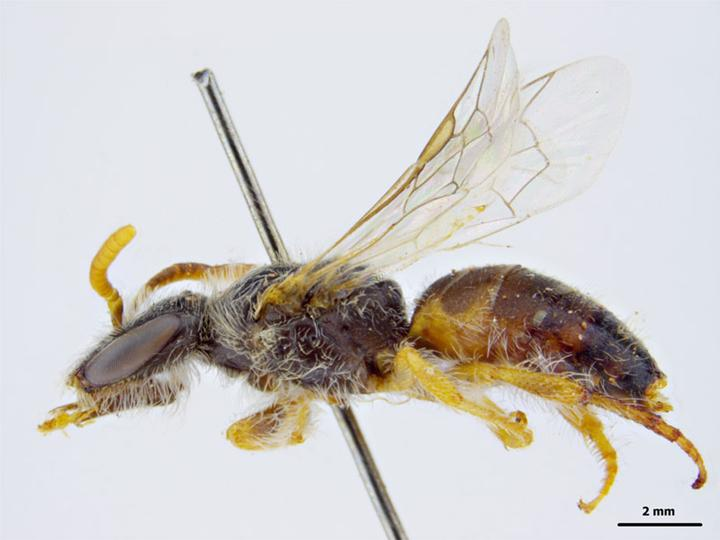
Male
