= Poole County =

Poole New South Wales
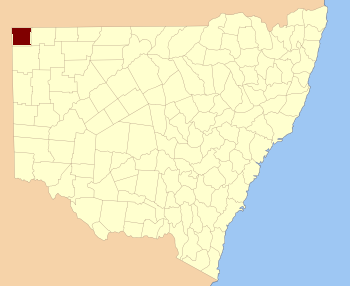
- Location in New South Wales
Lands administrative divisions around Poole:
South Australia	Queensland	Queensland
South Australia	Poole	Tongowoko
South Australia	Evelyn	Yantara

Poole County is one of the 141 cadastral divisions of New South Wales. It is located in the extreme north-west of the state, abutting Cameron Corner. It includes parts of Sturt National Park.

Poole County was named in honour of James Poole, (born?–1845), Charles Sturt's second-in-command.

== Parishes within this county ==
A full list of parishes found within this county; their current LGA and mapping coordinates to the approximate centre of each location is as follows:

Parish	LGA	Coordinates
Blackwood	Unincorporated	29°34′51″S 141°08′05″E
Churriga	Unincorporated	
Fort Grey	Unincorporated	29°17′31″S 141°03′07″E
Lang	Unincorporated	29°30′25″S 141°31′10″E
Mount King	Unincorporated	29°02′40″S 141°41′46″E
Mount Poole	Unincorporated	29°32′40″S 141°41′11″E
Nantomoko	Unincorporated	29°21′43″S 141°08′05″E
Patterson	Unincorporated	29°35′41″S 141°21′10″E
Pinaroo	Unincorporated	29°08′04″S 141°06′55″E
Stewart	Unincorporated	29°29′37″S 141°08′05″E
Sturt	Unincorporated	29°25′59″S 141°31′11″E
Tindara	Unincorporated	29°12′51″S 141°29′26″E
Yarraba	Unincorporated	29°12′59″S 141°11′13″E
