= Parish of Blackwood =

The Parish of Blackwood is a remote civil parish of Poole County in far North West New South Wales,

== Geography ==
The geography is mostly the flat, arid landscape of the Channel Country. The nearest town is Tibooburra to the south east, which is on the Silver City Highway and lies south of the Sturt National Park.

The parish has a Köppen climate classification of BWh (Hot desert). The County is barely inhabited with a population density of less than 1 person per 150 km² and the landscape is a flat arid scrubland.

== History ==
Charles Sturt camped at nearby Preservation Creek (Mount Poole) for six months during 1845, and in 1861 the Burke and Wills expedition passed to the east, through what is now the Pindera Aboriginal Area.

Gold was discovered nearby in the 1870s.
