= Parish of Tindara =

The Parish of Tindara is a remote civil parish of Poole County in far North West New South Wales, Australia.

== Geography ==
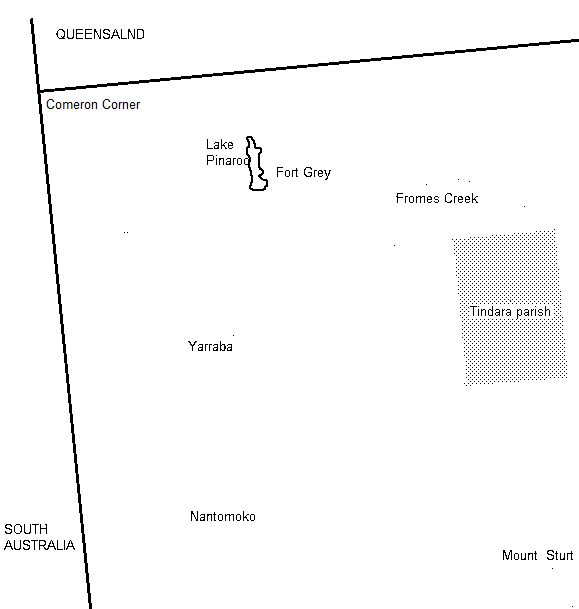
Map of Tindara Parish, (Poole County) Far western New South Wales.

The geography of Sturt is mostly the flat, arid landscape of the Channel Country. The nearest town is Tibooburra to the southeast, which is on the Silver City Highway and lies south of the Sturt National Park.

== History ==
Charles Sturt camped at nearby Preservation Creek (Mount Poole) for six months during 1845, and in 1861 the Burke and Wills expedition passed to the east, through what is now the Pindera Aboriginal Area, on the far side of Sturt National Park.

Gold was discovered nearby in the 1870s.
