= Parish of Pinaroo =

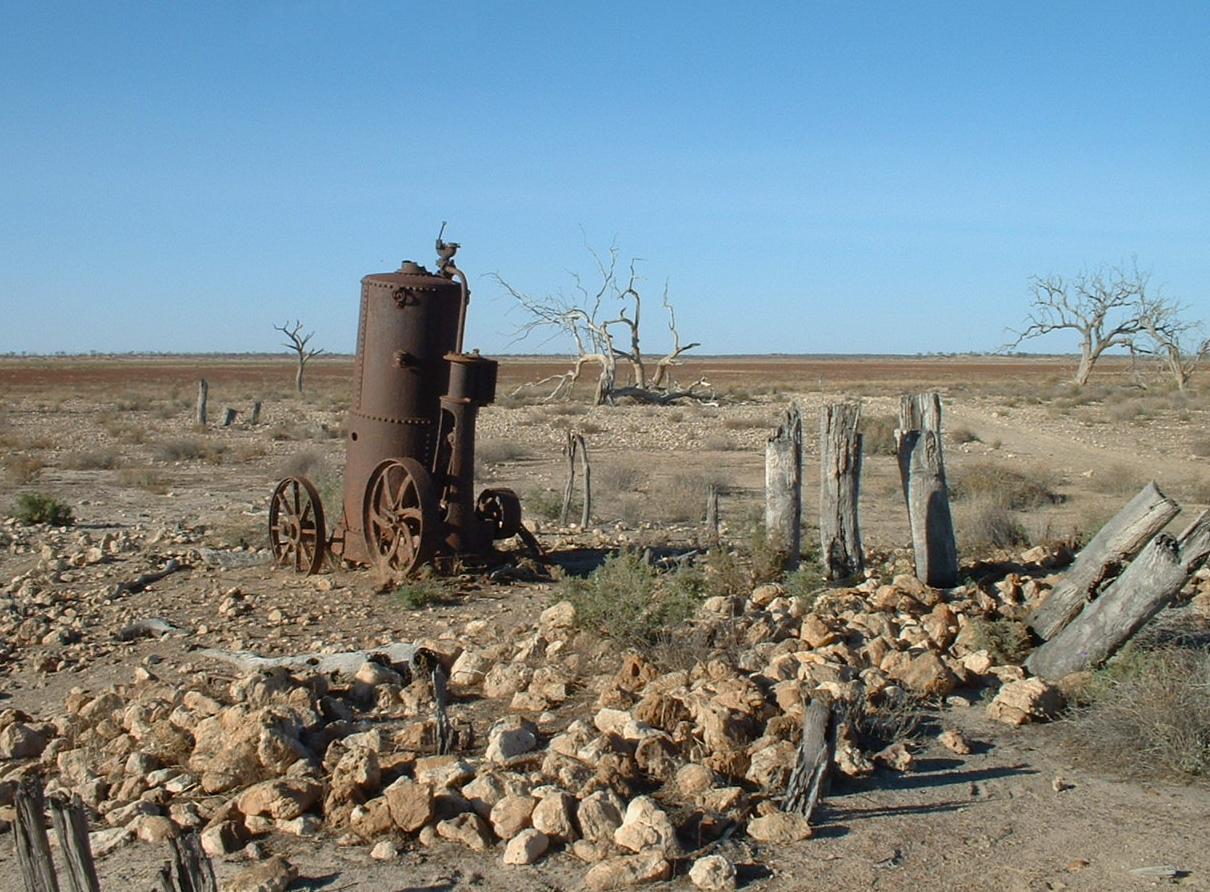
Country around Lake Pinaroo

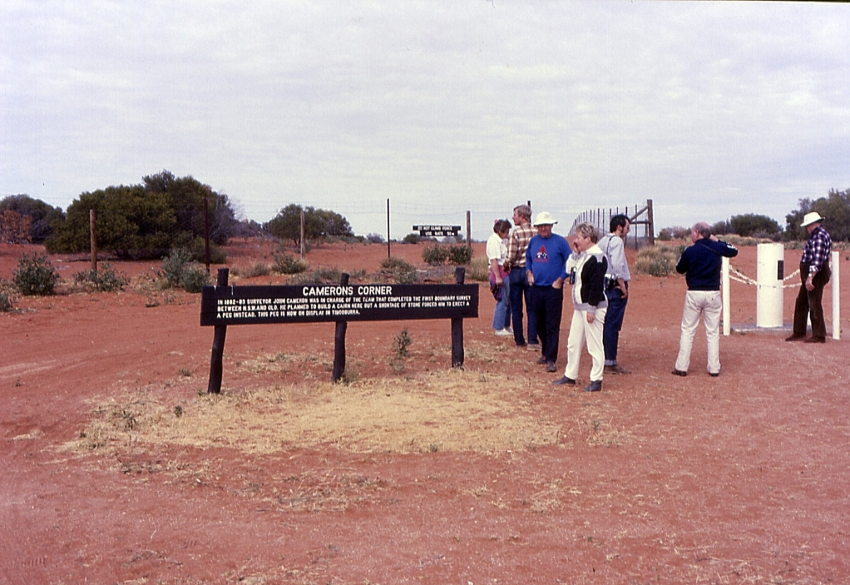
Pinaroo Parish is in the background.

Pinaroo is a remote civil parish of Poole County in far north west New South Wales, located at 29°08′04″S 141°06′55″E.

== Features ==
The parish is notable for being in the top north west corner of New South Wales and contains Cameron's Corner.

The geography of Pinaroo is mostly the flat, arid landscape of the Channel Country but includes Lake Pinaroo. The parish lies entirely within the Sturt National Park.

The Queensland-New South Wales border forms the northern boundary of the parish, which is marked by The Dingo Fence, and the western boundary is the border with South Australia.

The parish has a Köppen climate classification of BWh (Hot desert). The county is barely inhabited with a population density of less than 1 person per 150 km² and the landscape is a flat arid scrubland.

== History ==
The parish is the traditional lands of the Wadigali, Wandruwandha and Malyangaba Aboriginal peoples.

Charles Sturt passed through the parish during 1845.

In 1861 the Burke and Wills expedition passed to the east, through what is now the Pindera Aboriginal Area, on the far side of Sturt National Park.

Gold was discovered nearby in the 1870s, and the miners were soon followed by pastoralists.

In 1880 Cameron Corner Survey Marker was established.

The Dingo Fence was completed in 1885.

Sturt National Park was established in 1972.
