= Lange =

Lange may refer to:

== People ==
- Lange (surname), a German surname
- David Lange (1942–2005), 32nd Prime Minister of New Zealand
- Lange (musician) (born 1974), British DJ
- Lange (Brazilian footballer) (born 1966), Brazilian footballer

== Companies ==
- Lange (ski boots), a producer of ski boots used in alpine (downhill) skiing
- Lange Aviation, manufacturer of gliders
- Lange Textbooks, an imprint of McGraw-Hill Education
- A. Lange & Söhne, watchmakers

== Places ==
- Lange (crater), a crater on Mercury
- Lange Island, Bastian Islands
- Lange Peak, Antarctica
- Lange, Estonia, village in Haaslava Parish, Tartu County, Estonia
- Lange, Western Australia
- Langhe, a region in Piedmont, Italy
- Lange, a tributary of the Oker in Germany
- Lange Eylant, the Dutch term for Long Island

== See also ==
- Lang (disambiguation)
- Laing (disambiguation)
