= Lake Pinaroo =

Saline or brackish lake in New South Wales, Australia

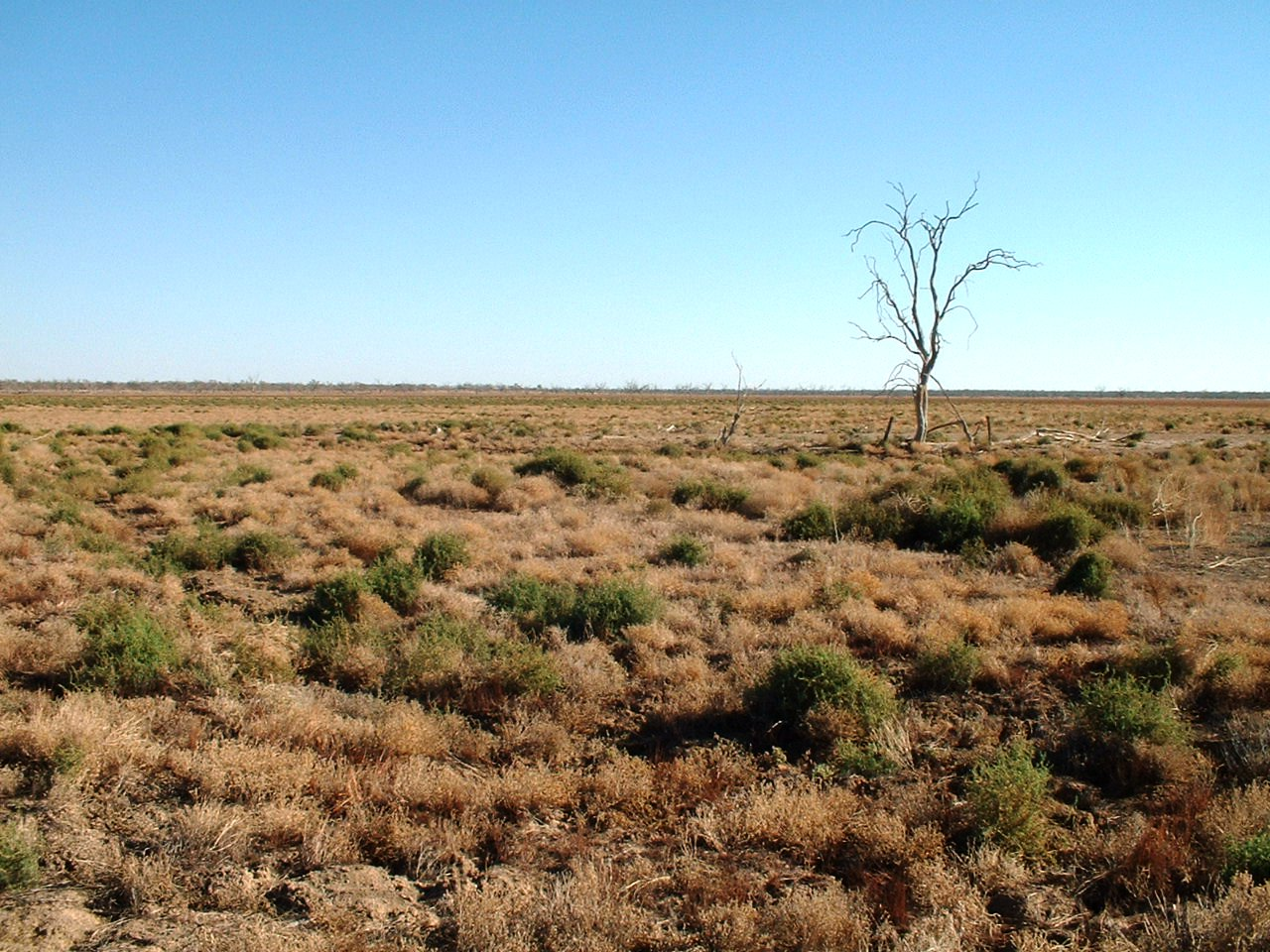
- Lake bed when dry

- Location within New South Wales
- Location: Sturt National Park, Far West New South Wales
- Coordinates: 29°05′51″S 141°13′30″E
- Type: Ephemeral saline or brackish lake
- Primary inflows: Frome Creek
- Primary outflows: None
- Catchment area: Lake Eyre Basin
- Basin countries: Australia
- Max. length: 5 km (3.1 mi)
- Max. width: 2 km (1.2 mi)
- Surface area: 718.8 ha (1,776 acres)
- Surface elevation: 125 m (410 ft)

Ramsar Wetland
- Designated: 19 March 1996
- Reference no.: 799

Lake Pinaroo lies in the north west corner of Sturt National Park, a protected national park in the Far West region of New South Wales, Australia. The location covers an area of 718.8 ha, approximately 80 km north-west of Tibooburra and 24 km south-east of Cameron Corner. On 19 March 1996 the lake was recognised as a wetland of international importance by designation (RS799) under the Ramsar Convention.

== Description ==
Lake Pinaroo also known as Fort Grey Basin has extremely high cultural values, with many Aboriginal sites and remains from European exploration and settlement.

Lake Pinaroo is part of the Lake Eyre drainage system, one of the largest systems in the world. The lake is listed as a wetland of international significance under the Convention on Wetlands and is the largest terminal basin in the NSW dune fields. When full, the lake and other ephemeral wetlands provide valuable breeding habitat for migratory birds.

Lake Pinaroo plays a crucial role in the survival of many plants and animal species, and supports large numbers of waterbirds and waders, including international migratory species and threatened species. When full, Lake Pinaroo is a contrast to the dry landscapes of Sturt National Park, and you can see waterbirds like the freckled and blue-billed ducks, as well as brolgas, grey falcons and budgerigars.

Lake Pinaroo is an ephemeral lake, meaning it floods for short periods of time and then may not hold water for several years, depending on rainfall. It is subject to erratic flood events interspersed with extended dry periods; once full, it may take up to six years to dry out. The location covers 718.8 ha in the arid north-western corner of New South Wales (NSW) 24 km south-east of Cameron Corner, and approximately 80 km north-west of Tibooburra. It forms the largest terminal basin within the NSW part of the Simpson–Strzelecki Dunefields bioregion.

The lake filled in March 2021 as a result of the weather system associated with the 2021 Eastern Australian floods with 100mm of rain falling near the lake itself, having been dry for 10 years.

Lake Pinaroo is also utilised during educational visits by school and university students and scientists. A loop walking track has been established at Lake Pinaroo, which takes in historical sites including an old hut, steam engine and Sturt’s tree. Interpretive signage for these attractions has been erected. Camping facilities are available at this site and are used heavily (in comparison to other sites in the national park), especially during July and October (Ramsar Information Sheet 1998). Park camping operates on a permit system and gas barbecues, water and toilets are provided.

== Ecology of Lake Pinaroo ==
=== Flora ===
Although plant species have been poorly surveyed at Lake Pinaroo, there are four threatened plant species known from Sturt National Park that may occur at Lake Pinaroo and Fromes Swamp, and an additional six threatened plant species are found in similar wetland habitats in NSW.

There is generally only sparse vegetation on the bed of Lake Pinaroo but this is highly variable and dependent on time since flooding and soil moisture. After flooding, short-lived herbs, shrubs and grasses such as neverfail (Eragrostis setifolia) may dominate. Coolibah (Eucalyptus coolabah) regrowth is found on the high ground around the lake margins. The surrounding sand dune country is vegetated with hopbush (Dodenaea attenuata), turpentine (Eremophila sturtii), saltbush (Atriplex), budda (Eremophila mitchellii) and whitewood (Atalaya hemiglauca).

Edible plants found in or surrounding Lake Pinaroo include ruby saltbush (Enchylaena tomentosa), purslane (Portulaca) and nardoo (Marsilea). Although vegetation is sparse at Lake Pinaroo and its surrounds, there is a large dormant seed bank which persists when the lake is dry. As there was no information on the aquatic plant species found at Lake Pinaroo or Fromes Swamp, the aquatic plant community was sampled by examining the sediment seed bank during a visit to the site in May 2006. Seed banks are an appropriate way to sample aquatic plant communities in arid wetlands and enable comparisons through all phases of erratic flooding and drying patterns.

The lake margins in May 2006 supported a relatively diverse mix of low shrubs (<1 m), forbs and grasses dominated by Atriplex stipitata, Enchylaena tomentosum, Sclerolaena diacantha, Sclerolaena divaricata, Sclerolaena intricata, Sclerolaena patenticuspis, Olearia meulleri, Aster subulatus, Crotalaria eremea ssp. eremea, Brachycome ciliaris var. lanuginosa, Sesbania cannabina var. cannabina, Psoralea australasica, Portulaca oleracea, Zehneria micrantha, Pterocaulon sphacelatum, Senecio cunninghamii var. cunninghamii, Heliotropium supinum, Glinus lotoides, Centipeda cunninghamii, Calotis hispidula, Ditrichia graveoloens, Epaltes australis and Sporobolus mitchelii.

The lake margin habitat included the inflow of Fromes Creek, which was notable for its high species richness. This was probably due to variable soil types (sandy loam to cracking clay), microtopographic variation, and higher frequency and duration of inundation.The lake bed with cracking clay and rocky clay soils supported low shrubland with low species richness that was dominated by Solanum oligocanthum, Glyccyrhiza acanthocarpa, Maireana aphylla and Enchylaena tomentosum, with forbs including Portulacca oleracea, Zehneria micrantha and the grass Sporobolus mitchelii. These vegetation communities provide important habitat and food supply for faunal species; for example, almost 35% of freckled ducks’ gut contents sampled in Lake Pinaroo contained seeds of the portulaca plant, while large coolibah trees can be utilised as nest sites by waterbirds and birds of prey. Large areas of canegrass can be found at Fromes Swamp, which would provide cover for birds and small mammals.

=== Fauna ===
Because it holds water for much longer periods than other wetlands in the desert region, it is regionally important as a breeding site and drought refuge for many kinds of animals, especially waterbirds that have bred on, for example, interdune swamps that only retain water for a few months. Waterbirds for which the site is important when inundated include freckled and blue-billed ducks. It is also used as a staging site by migratory waders such as black-tailed godwits, common greenshanks, marsh sandpipers and red-necked stints. It provides opportunities to see large flocks of desert birds such as budgerigars. Other animals recorded at the site are the eastern long-eared bat and interior blind snake.

==== Mammals ====
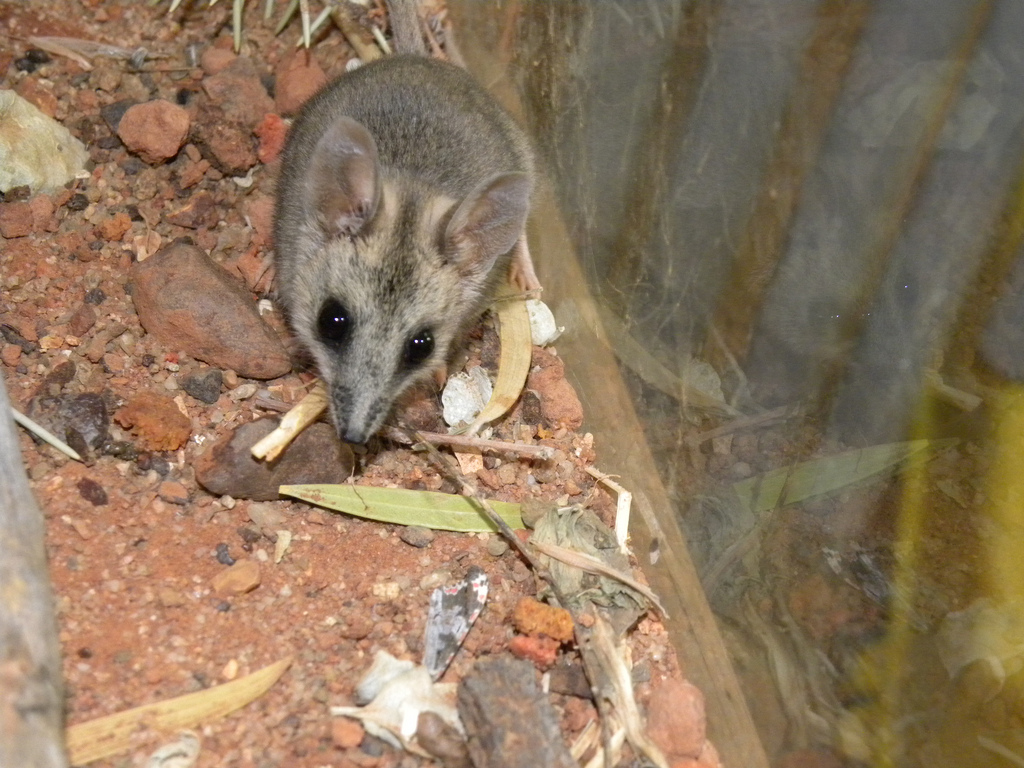
Sminthopsis macroura

Several threatened mammal species, including the striped-faced dunnart, eastern long-eared bat (a nationally and internationally vulnerable species) and the Forrest’s mouse are known from Sturt National Park and have a restricted distribution within the Western Division of NSW.

The distribution of the long-haired rat and water rat are most closely linked to water resources. The long-haired rat was seen in large numbers near Lake Pinaroo after heavy rains in 1974 and 1976. This species is known to undergo rapid increases in populations, primarily as a result of immigration after large rainfall events. This species of rat is listed as vulnerable in NSW.

==== Reptiles ====
The Australian Museum collected reptiles from Lake Pinaroo Ramsar site and surrounds from May 1978 to November 1999. Over this period, five threatened reptile species were recorded at Lake Pinaroo and Fort Grey. The interior blind snake is endangered in NSW and was recorded in Lake Pinaroo in September 1998. Other reptile species have restricted distributions in this part of north-west NSW. For instance, the yellow-tailed plainslider is thought to have isolated populations in the far west region and the mallee dragon relies on the western region for its survival with more than 50% of its national range in the western region. Most of these reptiles are dry country species and are not thought to qualify as wetland dependent species. However, during flood periods the Lake Pinaroo Ramsar site may support prey populations for some reptile species.

==== Birds ====
Lake Pinaroo acts as an important stopover and drought refuge for at least 40 species of waterbird, including several threatened species, such as the Australian painted-snipe. Other waterbird species also include the freckled duck, blue-billed duck and Caspian tern.

Seven resident species of shorebirds have been recorded at Lake Pinaroo. These include the black-winged wtilt, rednecked avocet, banded lapwing and masked lapwing, and smaller shorebird species, the red-kneed dotterel, black-fronted dotterel and red-capped clover.

In January 1980, 153 freckled ducks and 16 blue-billed ducks were recorded at Lake Pinaroo; both of these species are threatened in NSW. Although there have been few formal counts conducted at the Lake Pinaroo Ramsar site, four migratory shorebird species have been recorded at Lake Pinaroo since 1973. These include the black-tailed godwit, marsh sandpiper, common greenshank and red-necked stint.

The grey falcon has been recorded at Lake Pinaroo and nests along watercourses even when they are dry. Its breeding range is thought to be confined to the arid zone.

==== Invertebrates ====
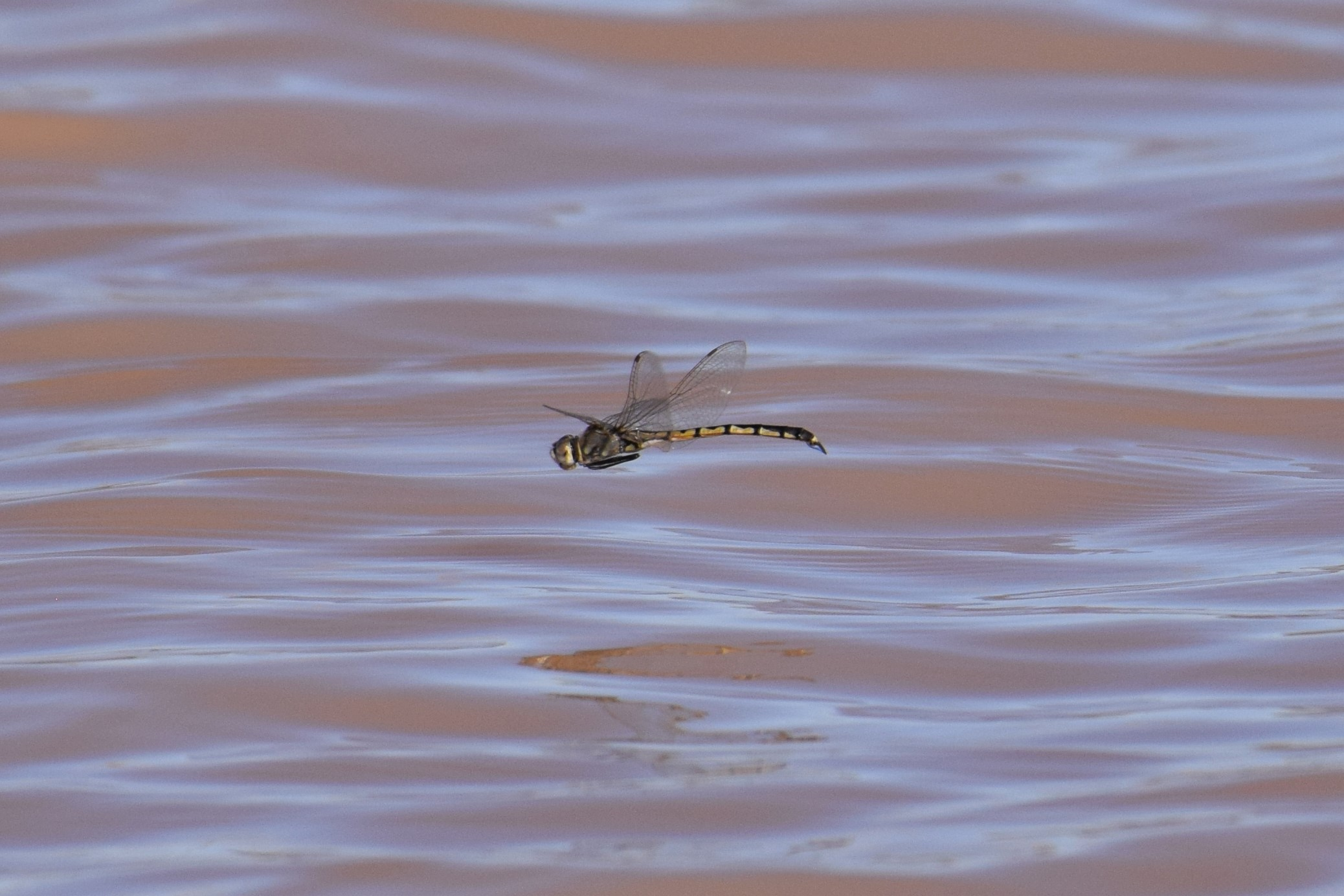
Hemicordulia tau in flight

Insects and crustaceans have resting stages resistant to desiccation and grow and reproduce opportunistically when water becomes available, becoming briefly abundant and productive as wetlands fill and then evaporate. Beetles, dragonflies, flies, moths, bugs, grasshoppers and spiders were observed during a visit to Lake Pinaroo in May 2006. It is highly likely that these invertebrates would be found in higher numbers at the site in times of flood. Invertebrates would provide a major food source for mammal, bird, reptile and amphibian species in the area. Crustaceans and aquatic insects are important food sources for waterbirds, such as herons, egrets, ducks and spoonbills, especially during the large breeding events that may follow a large flood. There have been no dedicated studies of invertebrate communities in Lake Pinaroo Ramsar site. Observations of invertebrates were made opportunistically in October 2001 when Lake Pinaroo was very turbid, fresh and shallow (perhaps up to 20–40 cm deep) and the zooplankton was dominated by Boeckella triarticulata. Remains of the yabby were observed at the site in May 2006.

==== Fish ====
There are no records of fish species in Lake Pinaroo during flood periods. Fish depend on water and only a few species have mechanisms for surviving dry periods. Fish would provide a source of food for waterbirds in flood periods in the Lake Pinaroo Ramsar site. The presence of fish-eating birds such as the Australian pelican and cormorants at the wetland during wet periods suggests that Lake Pinaroo may support some species of fish. Large catches of golden perch were recorded from other wetlands in the north-west of NSW, the Bulloo Overflow and Yantara and Bancannia Lakes, after extremely high summer rains recorded in 1971, 1974 and 1976. Further monitoring is needed to address this knowledge gap for the Lake Pinaroo Ramsar site.

== History ==
=== Aboriginal connections to country ===
Lake Pinaroo contains a wealth of Aboriginal cultural heritage, which is important to Aboriginal people, their culture, history, heritage and connection with Country. This includes artefacts, hearths, quarries and tool-making sites, stone arrangements, campsites and scarred trees. There are abundant grinding stones and numerous artefact scatters distributed over very large areas. Sites include both pre-contact and post-contact elements and therefore provide a record of Aboriginal culture and heritage undergoing a process of transformation and adaptation to new circumstances.

The land, water, plants and animals within a landscape are central to Aboriginal people and their cultural spirituality, identity and wellbeing. Aboriginal communities associate natural resources with the use and enjoyment of foods and medicines, caring for and utilising the land, continuation and the passing on of cultural knowledge, kinship systems and strengthening social and cultural connections. Sturt lies in the traditional Country of a number of Aboriginal groups. These include the Wadigali (alternative spelling Wadikali) centrally and to the west; Karengappa to the east; Wangkumara (alternative spelling Wongkumara) centrally, east to the Bulloo Overflow, north into Queensland and northwest to Innamincka, South Australia; and the Malyangapa to the south, including what was to become the township of Milparinka . Today Aboriginal people are represented in the region by the Tibooburra Local Aboriginal Land Council and by local elders who continue to identify the land within the park as part of their traditional lands. The Wangkumara People belong to the Karnic language group of the Lake Eyre Basin while Yarli languages were spoken by both the Malyangapa and Wadigali peoples. All three groups were thought to be multilingual and readily shared landscapes, resources and ceremonies. These groups also interacted with communities further afield including the Paakantji language speakers to the south.

=== Colonial explorers ===
The explorer Charles Sturt built a stockade on the eastern shore of Lake Pinaroo and the ruins of the original Fort Grey Homestead are on the north-western shore. A marker known as Sturt’s Tree is located towards the eastern shore of the lake, where it is periodically inundated. A travelling stock route traverses Lake Pinaroo, however, it has not been used since 1972. There is also extensive evidence of Aboriginal use and occupation around Lake Pinaroo, including hearths, scarred trees and artefact scatters.

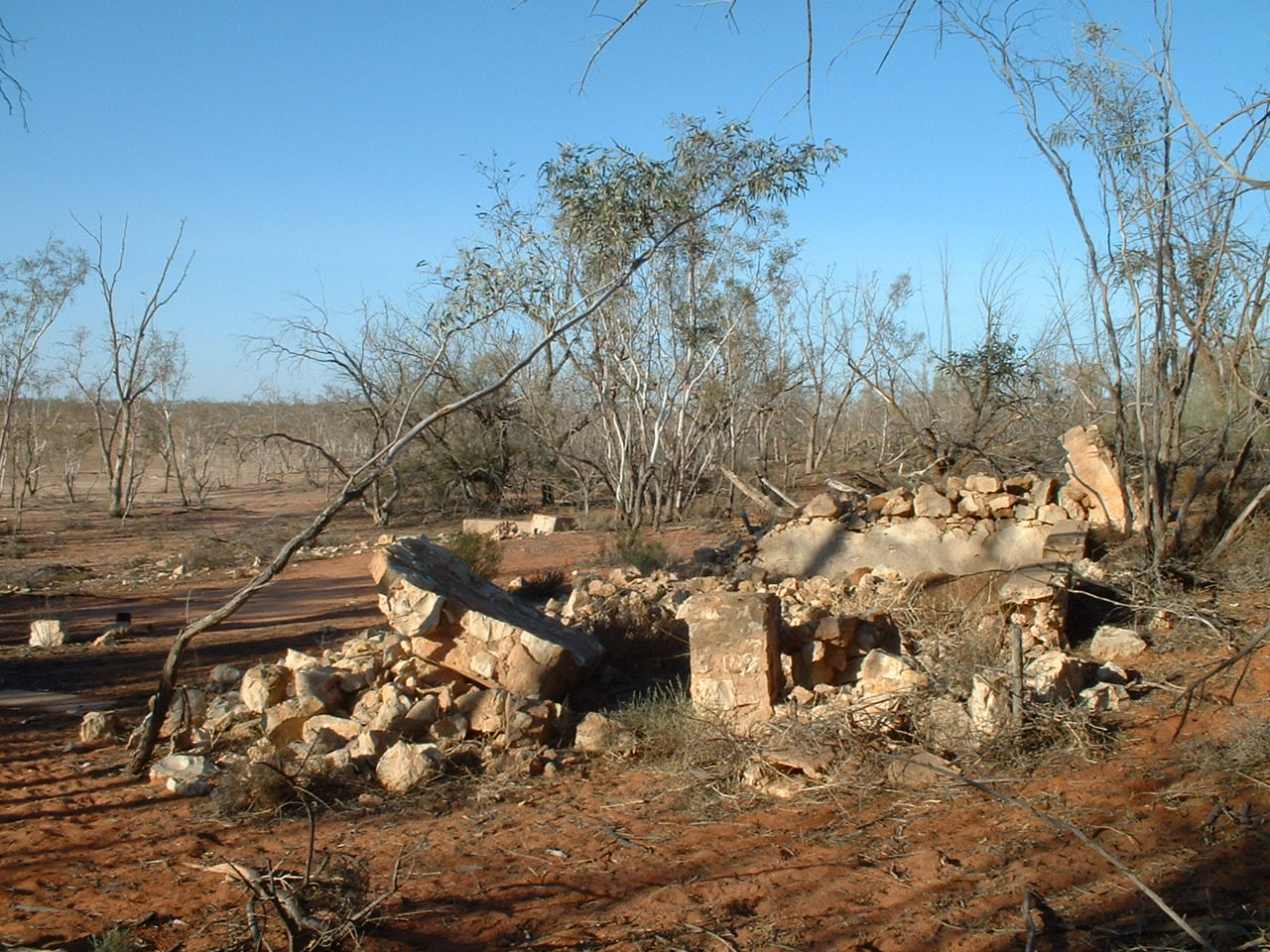
Fort Grey homestead ruins

Sites associated with Sturt’s expedition are located at Lake Pinaroo in the park. At one stage of the expedition Sturt established a base camp at Fort Grey where there were a number of Aboriginal huts. The camp included a timber stockade built to protect the men and their provisions from possible attacks by Aboriginal people. Archaeological investigations of the site have revealed an assortment of European artefacts, which may include items from Sturt’s expedition, as well as items associated with more recent drovers and pastoralists. A blazed box tree with "Sturt 1845" carved into the trunk, still stands near the stockade site and is thought to have been marked to record the location of a message bottle buried by a member of the expedition party.

Charles Sturt, the most prominent of these early explorers, built a stockade next to Lake Pinaroo and named it Fort Grey. This served as a base camp for the explorer’s party while he led smaller parties across what is now known as the Simpson Desert to the north and west. Pastoral infrastructure was inherited from stations that were purchased to create the national park. A crutching shed, hut remains, steam engine relics, bore relics and remains of a stone homestead are present in the bed and surrounding margins of Lake Pinaroo. Nine historic places have been identified in the Fort Grey area including Sturt’s tree, the Fort Grey homestead ruin, stockade, lake well, homestead and shearing complexes, bores and ground tanks, station fencing and yards. The homestead ruin, shearing complex and lake well are subject to flooding and are damaged.

=== Water quality, flooding and rainfall ===
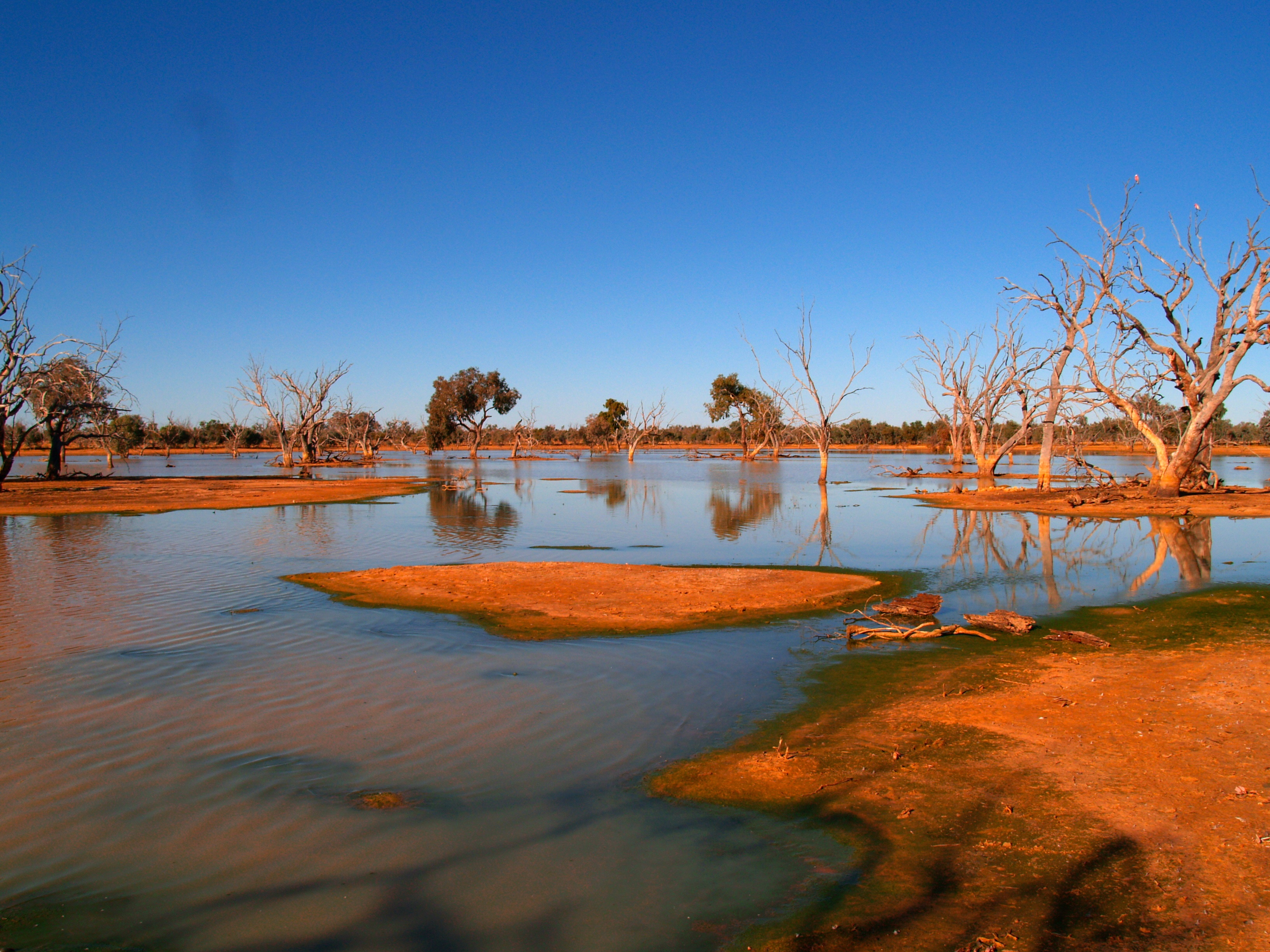
Lake Pinaroo July 2011

Apart from accounts of water depth and extent of flooding, there has been no regular monitoring of inflows or water depth at Lake Pinaroo. There is also no information available on the extent of groundwater flow into or out of Lake Pinaroo. However, it appears from rainfall data collected at Fort Grey and the limited literature available that Lake Pinaroo can retain water for up to seven years. For example, the lake filled in 1974 and had dried up completely in 1981; when full, the water depth in Lake Pinaroo is thought to be 0–2 m and can drop during summer months by over 60 cm.

Eight floods (>150 mm total monthly rainfall) were recorded in the Lake Pinaroo region in 1899–2006: in 1949, 1950, 1956, 1974, 1976, 1979, 1984 and 2000. Although there were some gaps in the rainfall records over this period, it appears that the minimum threshold for major flooding to occur would be a total monthly rainfall of 150 mm or greater at the Fort Grey rainfall gauge . Further monitoring of wetland inundation is required to determine if this 150 mm threshold is accurate.

Current understanding of the hydrology and ecology of Lake Pinaroo is limited. Further research into water quality, flood regimes and the hydrological relationship between surface water and groundwater is needed to improve knowledge of how the wetland functions. Known threats to the wetland include changes to its hydrology and ecology as a result of climate change and the impacts of introduced plants and animals.
