= Parish of Stewart =

Coordinates: 29°29′37″S 141°08′05″E

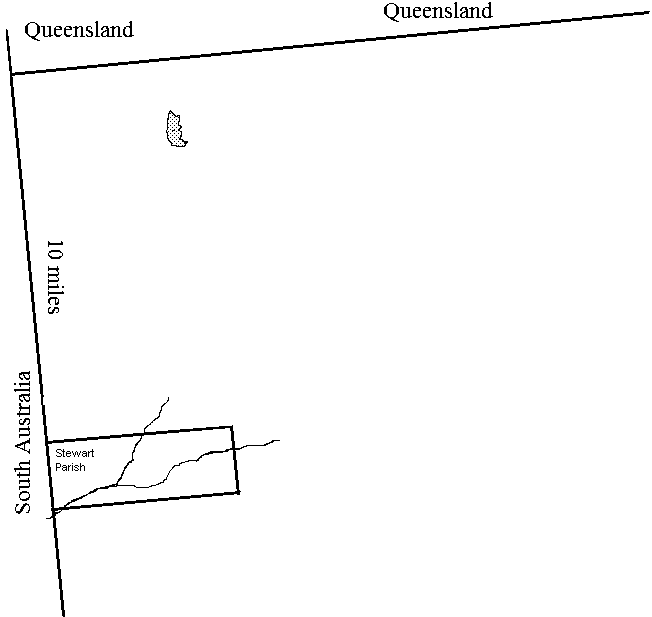
Map of the location of Stewart Parish in Far Western New South Wales.

Stewart, is a remote civil parish of Poole County in far North West New South Wales. Stewart is located 10 miles south of Cameron's Corner.

The Geography, of the parish is mostly the flat, arid landscape of the Channel Country. The parish has a Köppen climate classification of BWh (Hot desert). The County is barely inhabited with a population density of less than 1 person per 150 km² and the landscape is a flat arid scrubland.

== History ==
The parish is the traditional lands of the Wadigali people, one of the speakers of a Yarli language.

Charles Sturt explored the area in 1845.

== See also ==
- Stewart Parish, Killara County
