= Parish of Nantomoko =

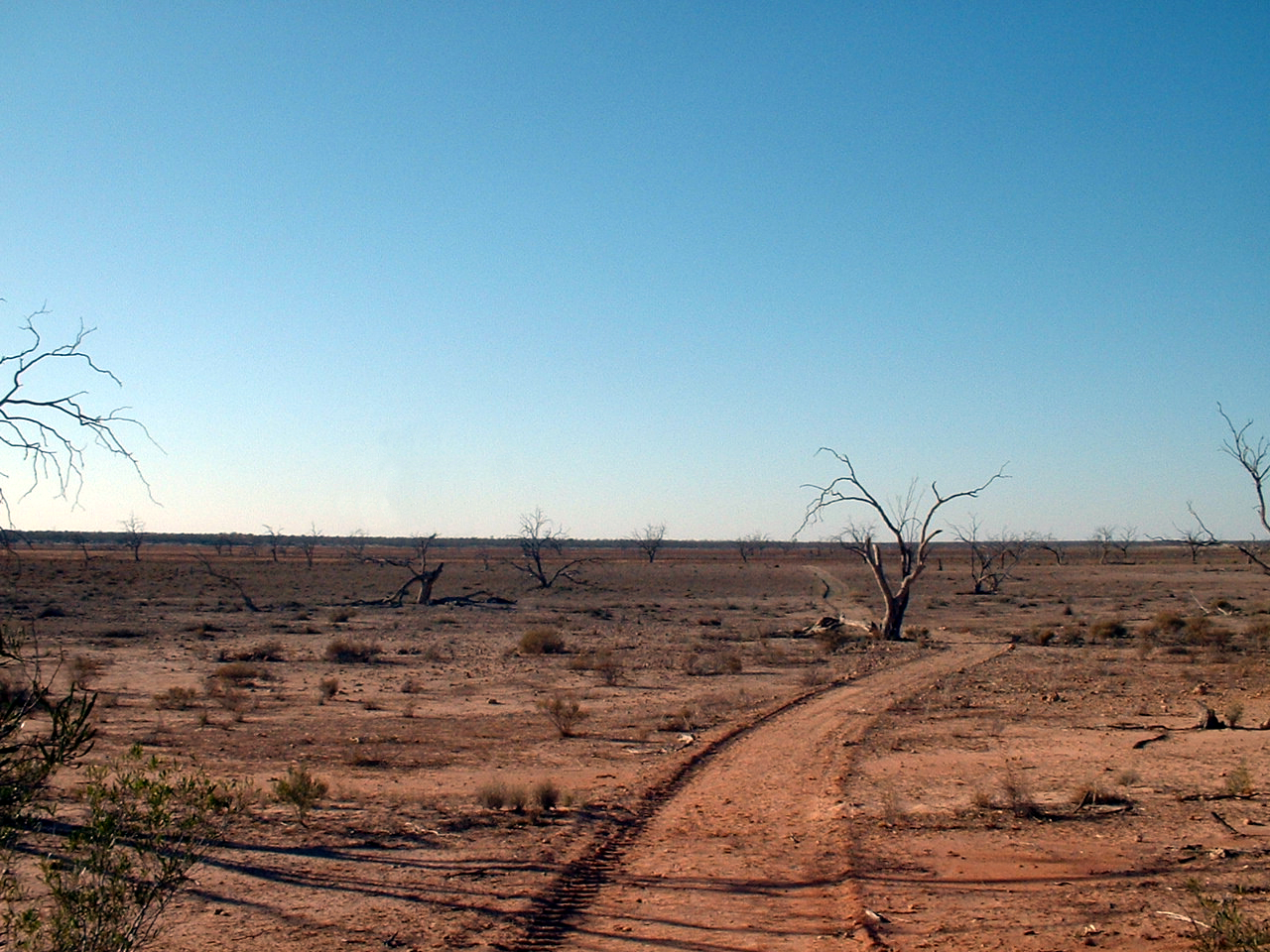
Landscape around Nantomoko

Nantomoko is a remote civil parish of Poole County in far northwest New South Wales. located at 29.2143°S 141.0805°E

== Geography ==
The geography of the parish is mostly the flat, arid landscape of the Channel Country. The parish has a Köppen climate classification of BWh (hot desert). The county is barely inhabited with a population density of less than 1 person per 150 km^{2} and the landscape is a flat arid scrubland.

The nearest town is Tibooburra to the east, which is on the Silver City Highway and the parish lies south of the Sturt National Park. There is also a small settlement at Cameron's Corner just over the Queensland Border.

== History ==
The parish is on the traditional lands of the Wadigali and to some extent Karenggapa, Aboriginal peoples.

Charles Sturt passed through the parish during 1845, and In 1861 the Burke and Will's expedition passed to the east, through what is now the Pindera Aboriginal Area.

Gold was discovered nearby in the 1870s, and the miners were followed by pastoral farming enterprises.
