= Parish of Yarraba =

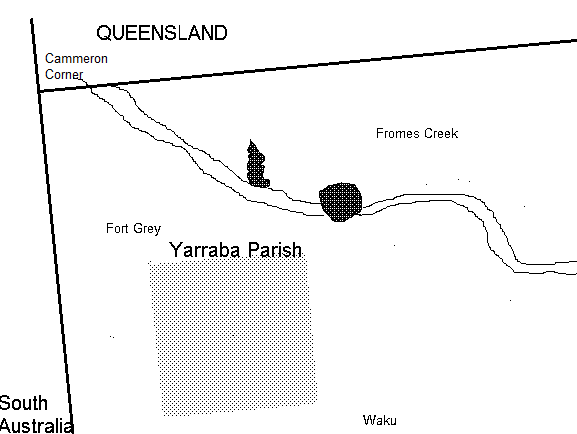
Map of Yarraba Parish (Pool County) Far Western New South Wales.

The Parish of Yarraba is a remote civil parish of Poole County in far North West New South Wales,.

The Geography, of Sturt is mostly the flat, arid landscape of the Channel Country. The nearest town is Tibooburra to the east, which is on the Silver City Highway and lies south of the Sturt National Park.
