= Parish of Mount King =

Parish of Poole County, New South Wales, Australia

Coordinates: 29.0240°S 141.4146°E

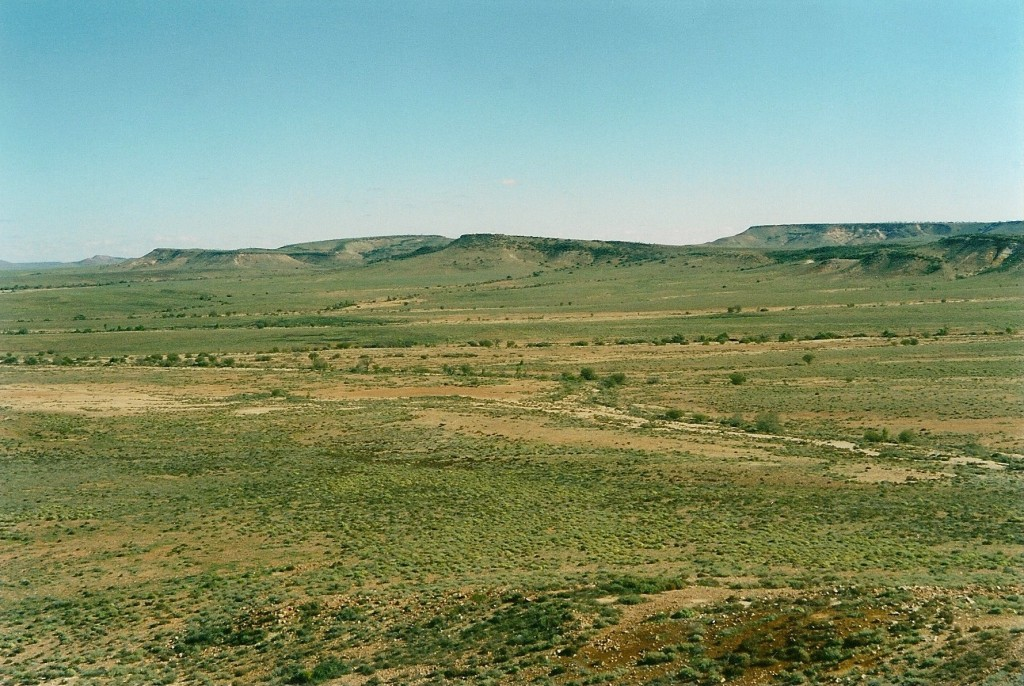
Country around Mt King.

Mount King, New South Wales is a civil parish of Poole County in far North West New South Wales, located at.

== Geography ==
The Geography, of Mt King is mostly the flat, arid landscape of the Channel Country but includes a series of mesa known as the "Jump ups" for which it is named.

Mt King is to the west of the Silver City Highway and lies entirely within the Sturt National Park.

The Queensland-New South Wales border forms the northern boundary of the parish, which is marked by The Dingo Fence.

The parish has a Köppen climate classification of BWh (Hot desert). The County is barely inhabited with a population density of less than 1 person per 150 km² and the landscape is a flat arid scrubland.

== History ==
The parish is the traditional lands of the Wadigali and Karengali people.

Charles Sturt explored the area in 1845.

The Mount King Station was established in the latter half of the 19th century, and is today one of seven former cattle stations in the Sturt National Park.
