= Langs =

Langs may refer to:

== People ==
- Jordan Langs, American football coach
- Robert Langs (1928–2014), American psychiatrist
- Sarah Langs (born 1993), American sportswriter

== See also ==
- Lang (disambiguation)
