= Laing =

Laing may refer to:

== People ==
- Laing (surname), a Scottish surname

== Companies ==
- Arriva UK Trains, a British transport company formerly known as Laing Rail
- John Laing Group, a British construction company
- Laing O'Rourke, a British construction company, formerly part of the John Laing Group
- MTR Laing, former name of London Overground Rail Operations

== Places ==
- Laing, West Virginia
- Laing Art Gallery, Newcastle upon Tyne, England
- Laing Dam, South Africa
- Laing Middle School, South Carolina
- Laing's Nek, a South African mountain pass
  - Battle of Laing's Nek, a Boer War battle at the pass
- Mount Laing, British Columbia

== Other uses ==
- Laing (band), a German girl group
- Laing (food), a Philippine dish made from taro leaves and coconut milk
- Philip Laing, 19th century ship
- Laing, a brand of water pump made by Goulds Water Technology a.k.a. Laing Thermotech, a subsidiary of Xylem Inc., a spin-off of ITT Inc.

== See also ==
- Lang (disambiguation)
- Laings
- Lange (disambiguation)
- Laingsburg (disambiguation)
