= Laingsburg =

Laingsburg may refer to:

== South Africa ==
- Laingsburg Local Municipality, in the Western Cape province
- Laingsburg, Western Cape, a town in the Laingsburg Local Municipality, Western Cape

== United States ==
- Laingsburg, Michigan, a city in Shiawassee County, Michigan

== See also ==
- Laing (disambiguation)
- Laings
