= Langham House =

Langham House may refer to:

in the United Kingdom

- Higher Langham House, a grade II listed building in Gillingham, Dorset
- Langham House Close, a grade II* 1950's Brutalist architectural-style development in Ham, London
- Langham House, Ham, a grade II 18th-century house on Ham Common, London
- Langham House, Rode. a grade II* house in Rode, Somerset

== See also ==
- Langham (disambiguation)
