= Lang Varkshi =

Lang Varkshi لنگ وركشي
- Village
- Country: Iran
- Province: Khuzestan
- County: Bagh-e Malek
- Bakhsh: Seydun
- Rural District: Seydun-e Shomali

Population (2006)
  - Total: 31
- Time zone: UTC+3:30 (IRST)
  - Summer (DST): UTC+4:30 (IRDT)

Lang Varkshi (Persian: لنگ وركشي, also Romanized as Lang Varḵshī) is a village in Seydun-e Shomali Rural District, Seydun District, Bagh-e Malek County, Khuzestan Province, Iran. At the 2006 census, its population was 31, in 5 families.
