= Langham Place =

Langham Place may be:

- Langham Place (Hong Kong)
- Langham Place, London
- Langham Place, New York, 400 Fifth Avenue
- Langham Place Hotels
