= Parish of Lang =

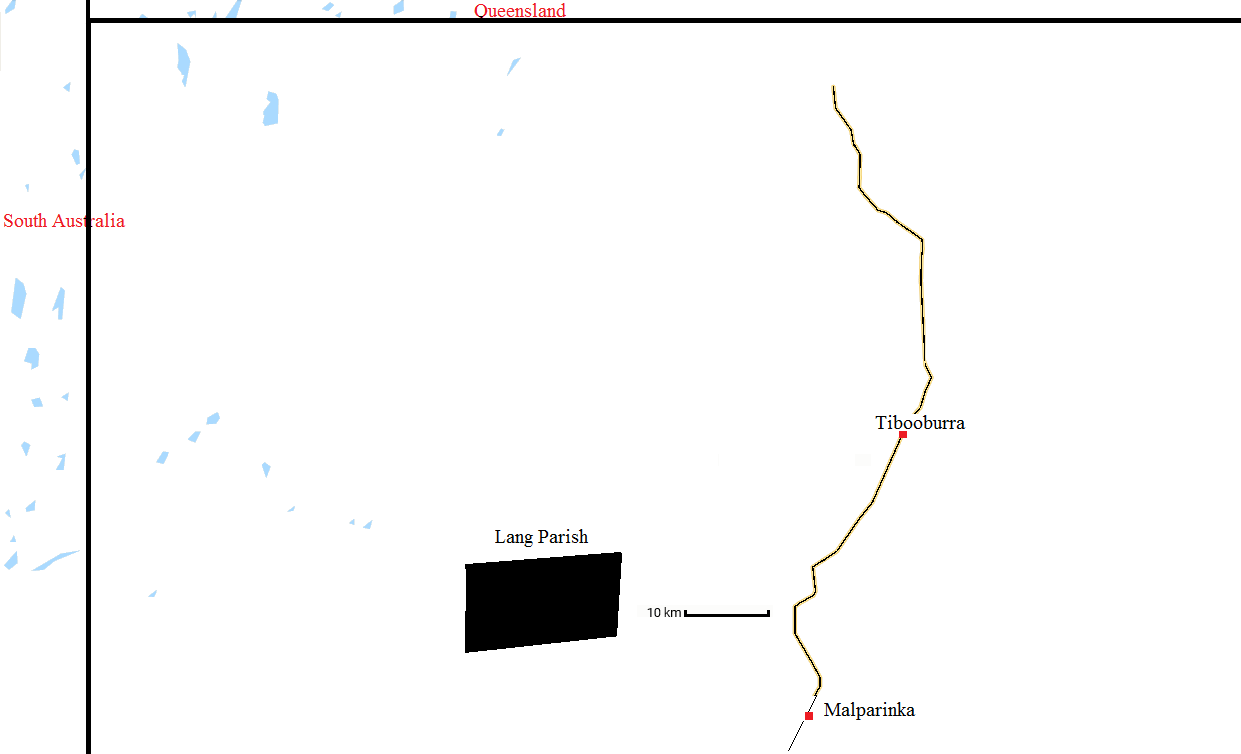
Map of Lang Parish, Poole County, New South Wales.

Lang, New South Wales, is a remote civil parish of Poole County in far northwest New South Wales. located at 29°30′25″S 141°31′10″E.

The geography of the parish is mostly the flat, arid landscape of the Channel Country. The parish has a Köppen climate classification of BWh (Hot desert). The county is barely inhabited with a population density of less than 1 person per 150 km^{2} and the landscape is a flat arid scrubland.
