= Lang, Georgia =

Defunct town in Georgia (U.S. state)

Coordinates: 33°36′22.40″N 84°55′53.79″W

Woodruff Road

Lang is an extinct town in Carroll County, in the U.S. state of Georgia.

== History ==
A post office called Lang was established in 1887, and remained in operation until 1896. Benjamin F. Lang, an early postmaster, gave the community his last name.
