= Langland =

Langland could refer to:

== People ==
- Joseph Langland, American poet
- Tuck Langland, American sculptor
- William Langland, fourteenth-century English poet

== Places ==
- Langland, Swansea, village on Langland Bay, on the Gower Peninsula of south-west Wales
- Langland, Caithness, in Scotland
