= Langton =

Langton may refer to:

== Places ==
=== Canada ===
- Langton, Ontario

=== England ===
- Church Langton, Leicestershire
- East Langton, Leicestershire
- Great Langton, North Yorkshire
- Langton, Cumbria
- Langton, County Durham
- Langton, Lincolnshire
- Langton, North Yorkshire
- Langton by Spilsby, Lincolnshire
- Langton by Wragby, Lincolnshire
- Langton Green, Kent
- Langton Herring, Dorset
- Langton Long Blandford, Dorset
- Langton Matravers, Dorset
- Little Langton, North Yorkshire
- Thorpe Langton, Leicestershire
- Tur Langton, Leicestershire
- West Langton, Leicestershire

=== Scotland ===
- Langton, Scottish Borders
  - Langton Castle

=== Wales ===
- Langton, Pembrokeshire

== Other uses ==
- Langton (surname)
- Langton's ant
