= Lang School =

The Lang School
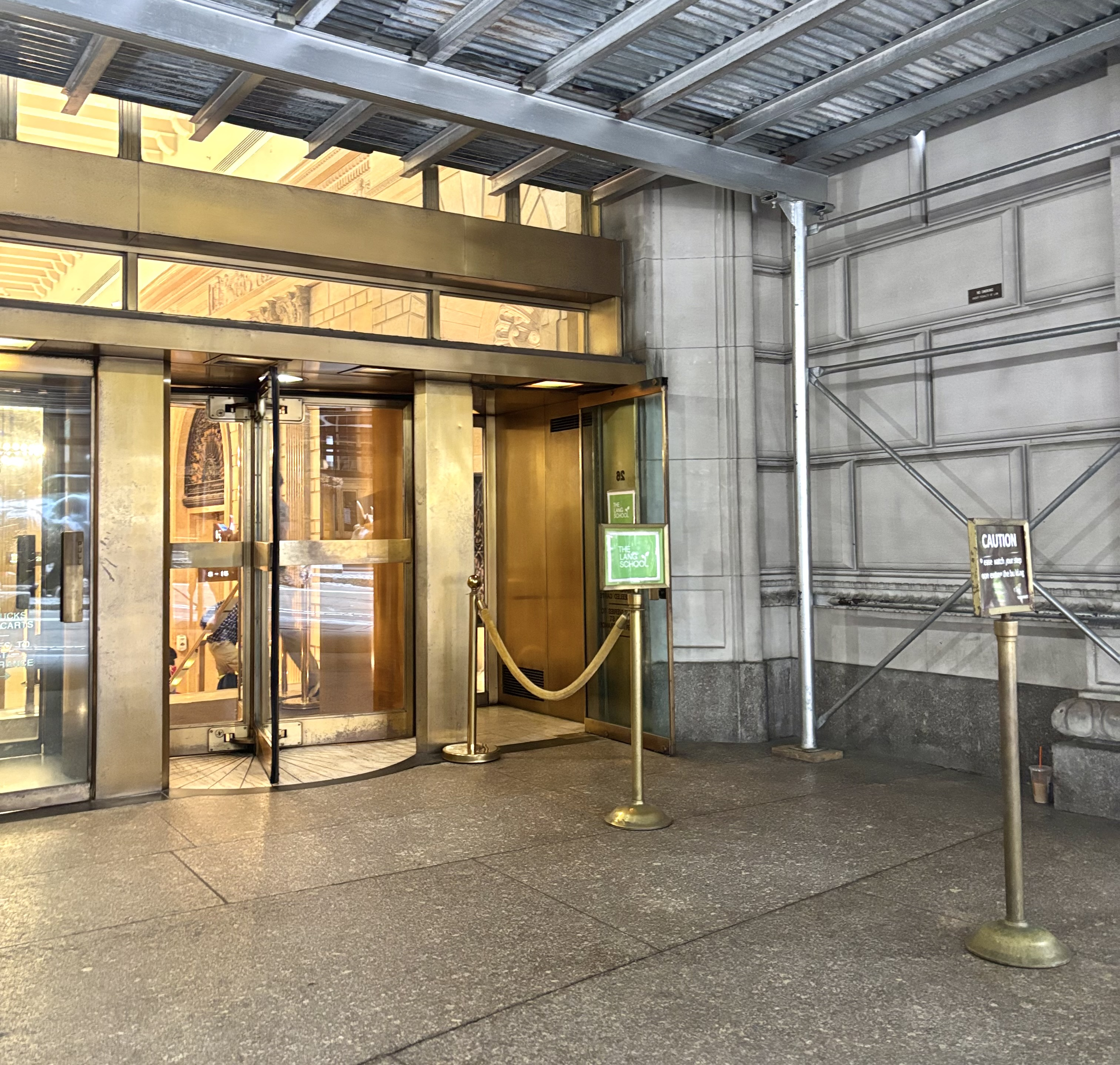

Location
- 26 Broadway, Suite 900; New York, New York 10004; United States
- 40.7149°N 74.0061°W

Information
- Established: September 2010; 15 years ago
- Grades: K-12
- Average class size: 12
- Student to teacher ratio: 12:2

The Lang School is a private, nonprofit, K-12 school marketing itself as serving the needs of twice exceptional (2e) students located in New York City's Financial District. It was the first K-12 school to specialize in educating twice-exceptional (2e) students, though it later came to include (and currently does accept) a wider range of gifted students.

== Students ==
Twice exceptional students are identified as being gifted/talented ("G&T") and diagnosed with specific learning challenges, such as ADHD, dyslexia and other language-based learning disabilities, anxiety, high functioning autism, social communication disorder, or sensory processing challenges. These students are often unable to master curriculum to their potential in a traditional classroom; they are often labelled "lazy" and misunderstood by teachers, administrators, and peers.

== History ==
The Lang School grew out of founder Micaela Bracamonte's dissatisfaction with the efficacy of NYC special education, gifted education, and public ICT programs in educating her two 2e sons, one of whom was already enrolled in a citywide gifted program with special education supports. It opened in September 2010 with two classes totaling 13 students. By its eighth year (2017), the school had five classes containing approximately 50 gifted and twice-exceptional students.

== Name ==
The Lang School is named after Cyril Lang, the founder's tenth grade English teacher. Lang was a suburban Maryland public school teacher who, in 1979, taught what the local Board of Education deemed overly challenging material to his "ungifted" students, engaging them in Socratic debates about Machiavelli’s The Prince and Plato’s Republic, texts normally limited to 12th-grade Advanced Placement classes. Although the school where he was working threatened to fire him if he did not teach what was commonly considered 10th-grade material in more traditional ways, he persisted. “I made a premeditated, intellectual decision to continue teaching the way I had,” he said at the time. “There’s nothing wrong with the genetic makeup of these students. It’s the educational system that’s declining. We are bearing witness to the triumph of mediocrity.”
