= Mount Poole Station =

Pastoral lease in New South Wales

Coordinates: 29.662°S 141.796°E

Location in New South Wales

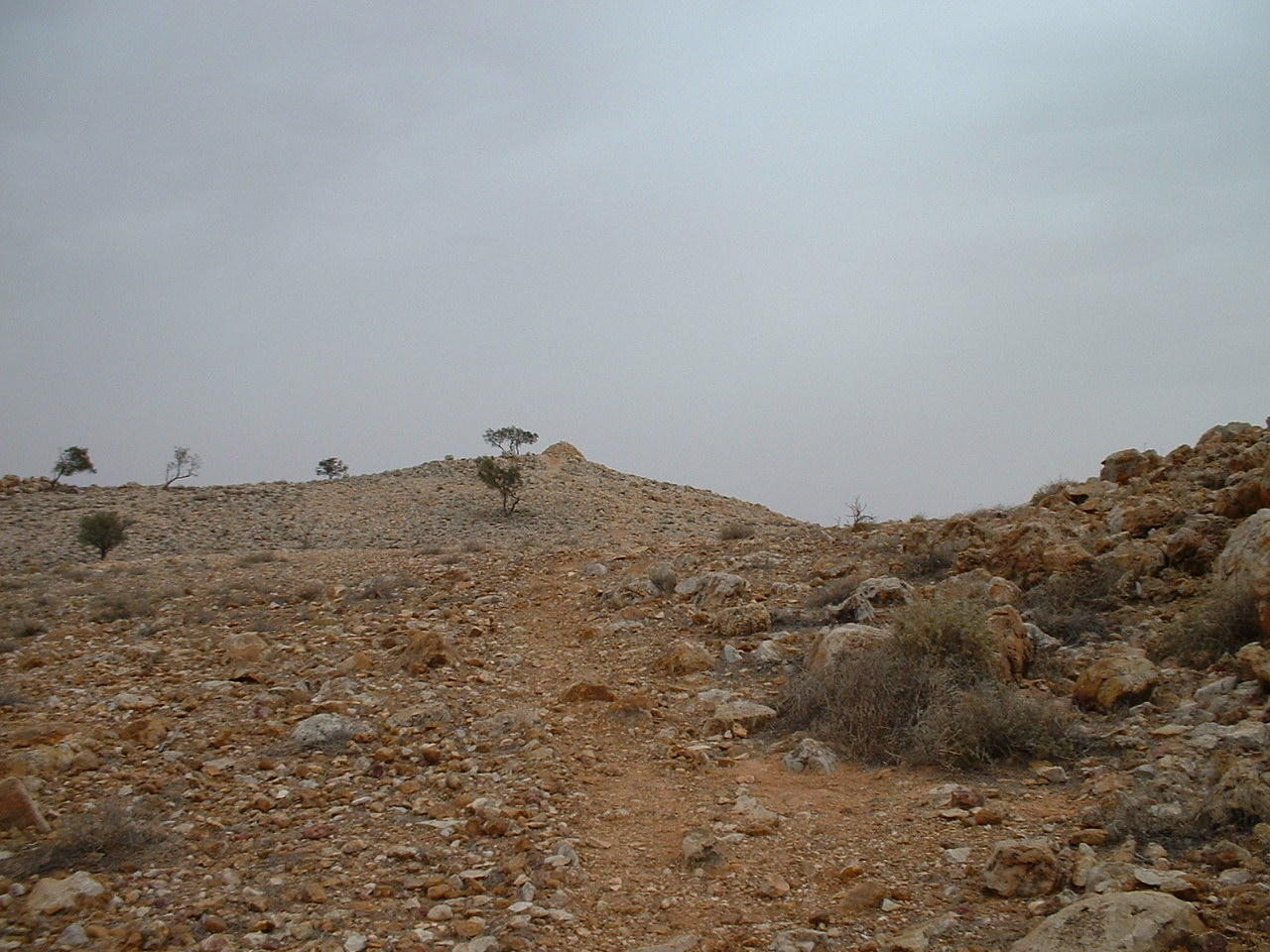
Mount Poole

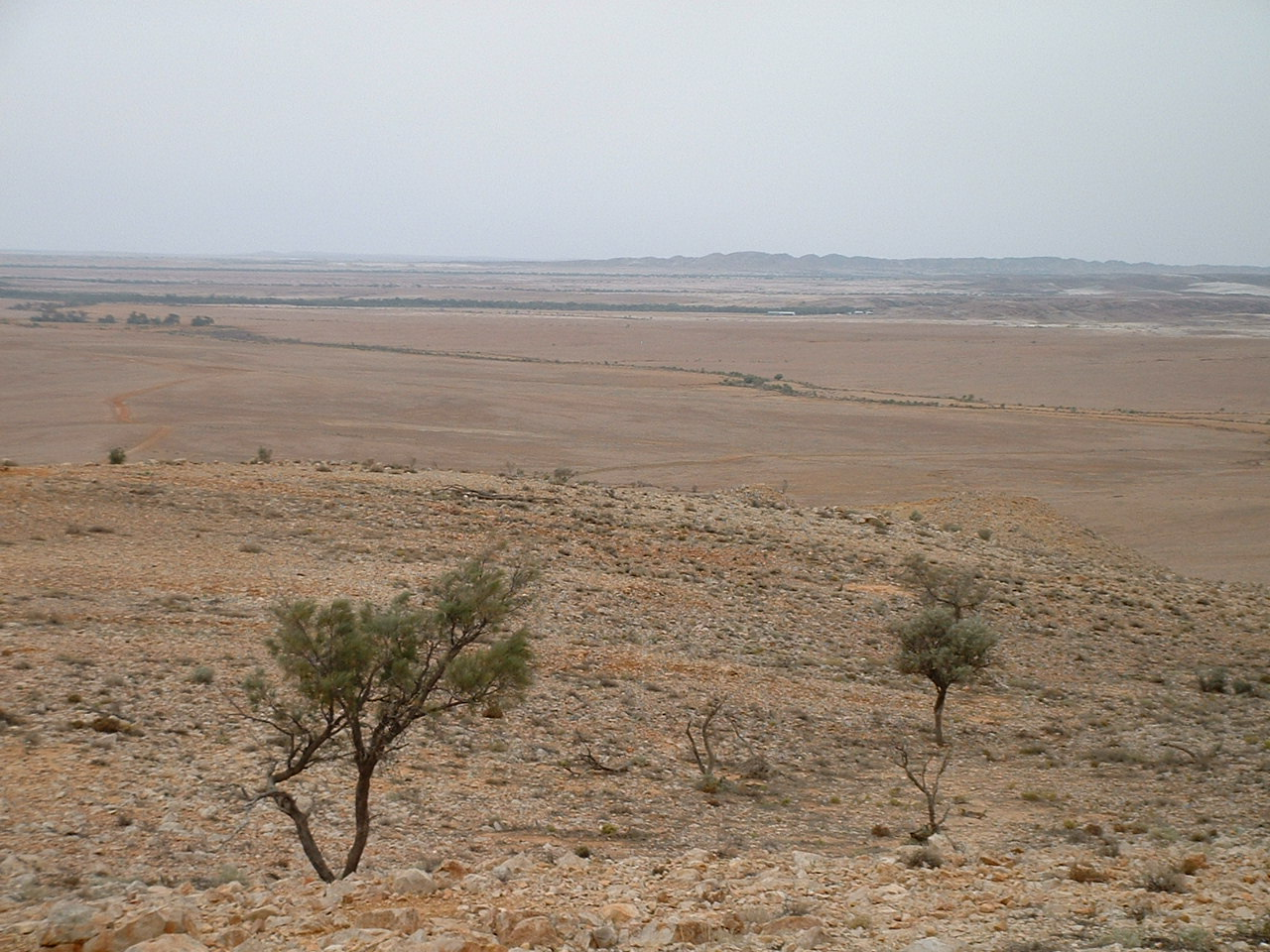
View from Mt Poole

Mount Poole Station is a pastoral lease operating as a sheep station in New South Wales.

The property is situated approximately 33 kilometres (21 mi) south west of Tibooburra and 181 kilometres (112 mi) north west of White Cliffs.

== History ==
The first Europeans to venture into the area was the expedition led by Captain Charles Sturt, who arrived at the height of summer during a drought in 1845. For many months the party camped by a waterhole in a rocky basalt glen which is now known as Depot Glen, and many of the men were ill with scurvy. James Poole, Sturt's second in command, died shortly after the group broke camp and his body was buried under a beefwood tree not far from the camp at the glen. The tree was marked with Poole's initials and Sturt had his men erect a stone cairn on a nearby rise.

Duncan Elphinstone McBryde became the lessee of Mount Poole in 1872. Gold was discovered near the property in 1880 and in 1883 McBryde moved to Melbourne.

In 1908 the property was owned by the cattle baron Sidney Kidman, at this time it occupied an area of approximately 700 square kilometres (270 sq mi).

The station was closed in 1929 with only a few men left as care-takers following an intense drought. The few sheep remaining were being shorn in the paddocks as they were to weak to make it to the shearing shed.

== See also ==
- List of ranches and stations
