= Lange (surname) =

Lange (/ˈlæŋ/, rarely /ˈlɒŋi/; German: [ˈlaŋə]) is a surname derived from the German word lang "long". Notable people with the surname include:

- Alex Lange (born 1995), American baseball player
- Algot Lange (1884 – after 1941), Swedish explorer
- André Lange (born 1973), German bobsleigher
- Andrew E. Lange (1957–2010), American astronomer
- Antoni Lange (1863–1929), Polish poet
- Artie Lange (born 1967), American comedian
- Bill Lange (disambiguation)
- Carl Lange (disambiguation)
- Christian Lange (born 1967), German politician
- Christian Lous Lange (1869–1938), Norwegian politician and Nobel Prize winner
- Corinna Lange (born 1986), German politician
- Dagmar Lange (1914–1991), Swedish crime novelist
- Darren Lange (born 1971), Australian swimmer
- David Lange (1942–2005), Prime Minister of New Zealand (surname pronounced as long-ee)
- David Hadley Lange (born 1947), Canadian politician for Saskatchewan
- Dorothea Lange (1895–1965), American photographer
- Eric Lange (born 1973), American actor
- Even Lange (born 1946), Norwegian economic historian
- Friedrich Albert Lange (1828–1875), German philosopher
- Gustav Lange (1830–1889), German composer
- Hans-Dieter Lange (1926–2012), German TV journalist
- Harry Lange (1930–2008), German illustrator and production designer for 2001: A Space Odyssey
- Helene Lange (1848-1930), German activist
- Helmut Lange, World War I flying ace
- Henrik Lange (1908–2000), Swedish lieutenant general
- Herbert Lange (1909–1945), German Nazi SS concentration camp commandant and Holocaust perpetrator
- Hope Lange (1933–2003), American actress
- Ina Lange (1846—1930), Finnish writer, pianist and music historian
- Jakob Emanuel Lange (1864–1941), Danish mycologist
- Jesper Lange (born 1986), Danish footballer
- Jessica Lange (born 1949), American actress
- Jim Lange (1932–2014), American game show host
- Joep Lange (1954–2014), Dutch clinical researcher specialising in HIV therapy
- Johan Lange (1818–1898), Danish botanist
- Johann Joachim Lange (1670–1744), German theologian and philosopher
- Johann Peter Lange (1802–1884), German theologian
- John Lange, pen name of Michael Crichton (1942–2008), American author, producer, director, and screenwriter
- John E. Lange (born 1949), American administrator
- John Frederick Lange Jr. (born 1931), professor and writer, better known by his pen name John Norman
- Johnny Lange (1905–2006), songwriter, author and publisher
- Joseph Lange (1751–1831), Vienna actor and painter, brother-in-law to Mozart
- Julius Lange (1817–1878), German landscape painter
- Julius Lange (1838–1896), Danish art historian
- Katrin Lange (born 1971), German politician
- Klaus Lange (born 1995), Argentine sailor
- Lange (musician) (Stuart Langelaan) (born 1974), British DJ
- Lola Lange (1922–2013), Canadian feminist
- Ludwig Lange (architect) (1808–1868), German architect and landscape designer
- Ludwig Lange (philologist) (1825–1885), German philologist and archaeologist
- Ludwig Lange (physicist) (1863–1936), German physicist
- Luise Lange (1891–1978), German physicist
- Marilyn Lange (born 1952), 1975 Playboy Magazine Playmate Of The Year
- Marita Lange (1943–2025), German shot putter
- Mary Elizabeth Lange (1784–1882), foundress of Oblate Sisters of Providence
- Max Lange (1832–1899), German chess player
- Michael Lange (born 1950), American television director and music producer
- Mike Lange (1948–2025), American sportscaster
- Morten Lange (1919–2003), Danish mycologist and politician
- Norah Lange (1905–1972), Argentine author
- Oliver Lange (1927–2013), life-long pen name of American novelist John Warren Wadleigh
- Oscar V. Lange (1853–1913), American photographer
- Oskar R. Lange (1904–1965), Polish economist and diplomat
- Patrick Lange (born 1981), German conductor
- Robert John "Mutt" Lange (born 1948), record producer
- Rudolf Lange (1910 – after 1945), Nazi German SS officer, and Holocaust perpetrator
- Samuel Gotthold Lange (1711–1781), German poet
- Santiago Lange (born 1961), Argentine sailor
- Simone Lange (born 1976), German politician
- Ted Lange (born 1948), American actor
- Thomas Lange (disambiguation)
- Thor Lange (disambiguation)
- Ulrich Lange (born 1969), German politician
- Vincent Lange (born 1974), German volleyball player
- Wilfried Lange (1910–1993), German chess master
- Yago Lange (born 1988), Argentine sailor

== See also ==
- Lange (disambiguation)
- Peter Lange-Müller (1850-1926), Danish composer and pianist
- De Lange, DeLange, Dutch surname
- Lang (surname)
- Langer (surname)
- Laing (surname)
