= De Lange =

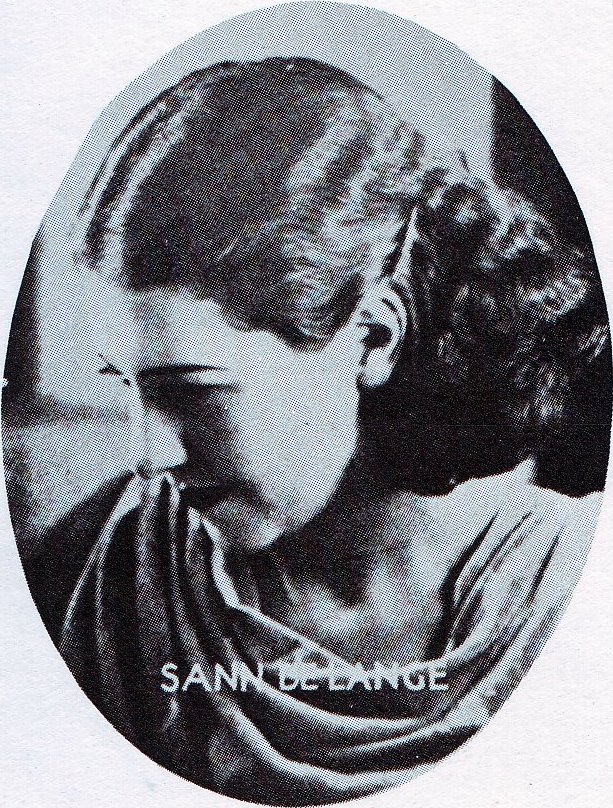
South African actress Sann de Lange.

De Lange is a Dutch surname, meaning "the tall one". In 2007 about 11,000 people in the Netherlands carried the name. Notable people with this surname include:

- Allert de Lange (1855–1927), Dutch publisher and book dealer
- Andre de Lange (born 1984), South African cricketer
- Bob de Lange (1916–1978), Dutch actor
- Con de Lange (born 1981), South African cricketer
- Cornelia Catharina de Lange (1871–1950), Dutch pediatrician who described De Lange syndrome
- Daan de Lange (1915–1988), Dutch and Norwegian chess player
- Daniël de Lange (1841–1918), Dutch cellist, composer and conductor
- Eddie De Lange (1904–1949), American bandleader and lyricist
- Espen de Lange, Norwegian curler (active 1980s–1990s)
- Esther de Lange (born 1975), Dutch politician
- Esther de Lange (cricketer) (born 1984), Dutch cricketer
- Heinz de Lange (1937–2016), German footballer
- Ilse de Lange (born 1977), Dutch country and pop singer
- Jelle de Lange (born 1998), Dutch footballer
- Jens Isak de Lange Kobro (1882–1967), Norwegian politician
- Jeroen de Lange (born 1968), Dutch politician
- Jochum de Lange, 18th-century Norwegian farmer's rebellion leader
- Johann de Lange (1959–2025), Afrikaans poet, short story writer and critic
- Johnny de Lange (born 1958), South African politician
- Karin de Lange (born 1964), Dutch sprinter
- Leendert de Lange (born 1972), Dutch politician
- Marchant de Lange (born 1990), South African cricketer
- Marie Jeanette de Lange (1865–1923), Dutch painter and dress reform advocate
- Nicholas de Lange (born 1944), British rabbi and historian
- Patrick de Lange (born 1976), Dutch baseball player
- Paul de Lange (born 1981), Dutch footballer
- Peter James de Lange (born 1966), New Zealand botanist
- Philip de Lange (c.1705–1766), Dutch-Danish architect
- Pieter de Lange (1926–2019), South African educationalist
- Rik de Lange (born 1956), Dutch politician
- Samuel de Lange Jr. (1840–1911), Dutch organist and composer
- Samuel de Lange Sr. (1811–1894), Dutch pianist, organist and composer
- Titia de Lange (born 1955), Dutch biochemist at Rockefeller University
- Theodore Jasper Maclean de Lange (1914–2005), RNZAF Air Commodore
- Trygve de Lange (1918–1981), Norwegian lawyer
- Ute de Lange Nilsen (born 1931), Czech-Norwegian jewelry artist and puppet maker
- Veronique de Lange (born 1987), South African singer
- Victoria Puig de Lange (1916–2008), Ecuadorian author, magazine editor, and diplomat

== See also ==
- DeLange
- Lange (surname)
- De Korte – Dutch surname meaning "the short one"
