= Ludwig Lange =

Ludwig Lange may refer to:

- Ludwig Lange (architect) (1808–1868), German architect
- Ludwig Lange (philologist) (1825–1885), German philologist and archaeologist
- Ludwig Lange (physicist) (1863–1936), German physicist

== See also ==
- Lange (surname)
