= Bredgade 63–65 =

Building in Copenhagen, Denmark

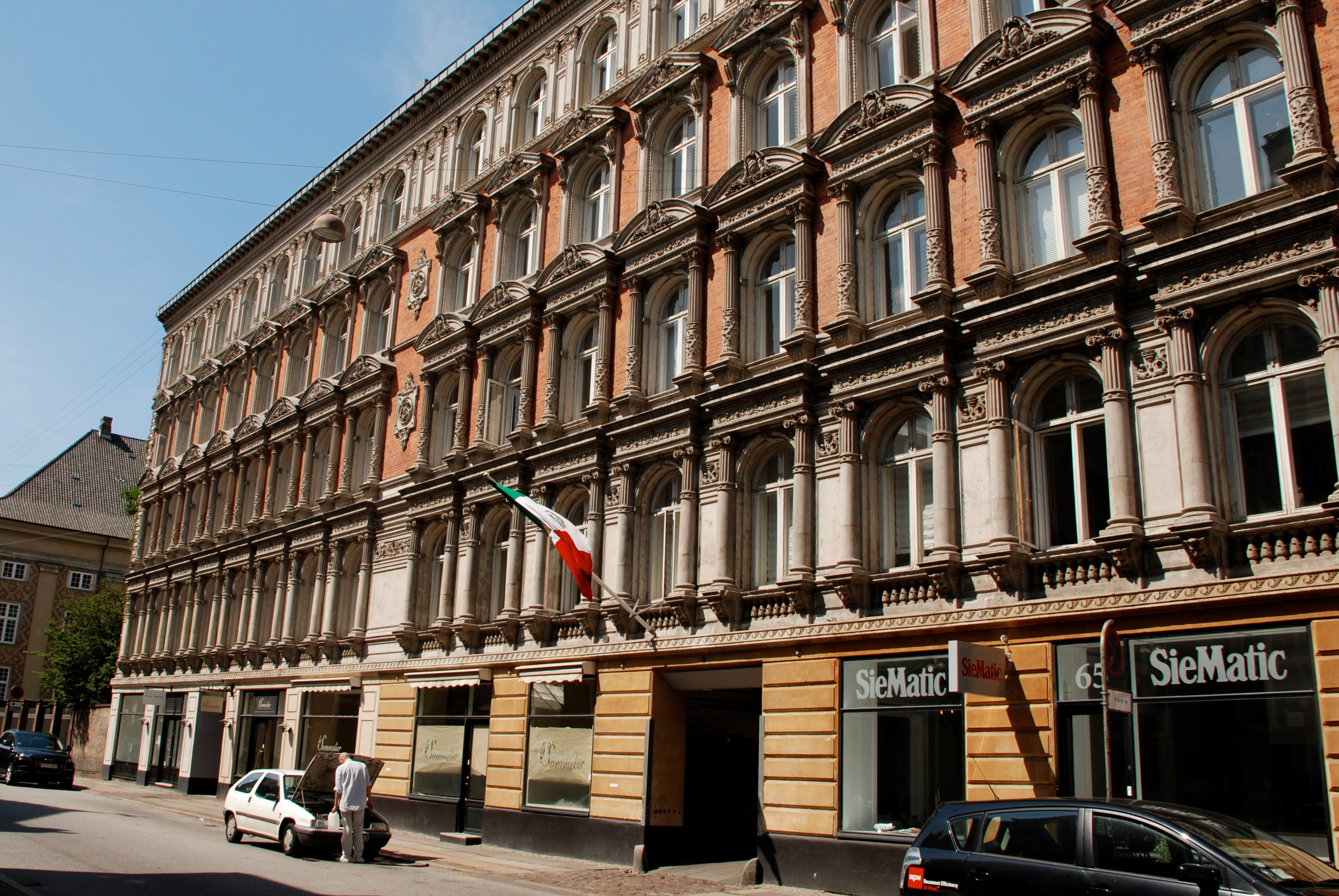
- Interactive map of the Bredgade 63–65 area

General information
- Location: Copenhagen, Denmark
- Coordinates: 55°41′10.8″N 12°35′30.23″E
- Completed: 1887

Design and construction
- Architect: Ferdinand Vilhelm Jensen

Bredgade 63–65 are two identical Renaissance Revival style properties situated on Bredgade, adjacent to the small garden complex in front of Østre Landsret, in the Frederiksstaden of central Copenhagen, Denmark. Both buildings were individually listed in the Danish registry of protected buildings and places in 1988. The Mexican Embassy is based at No. 65.

== History ==
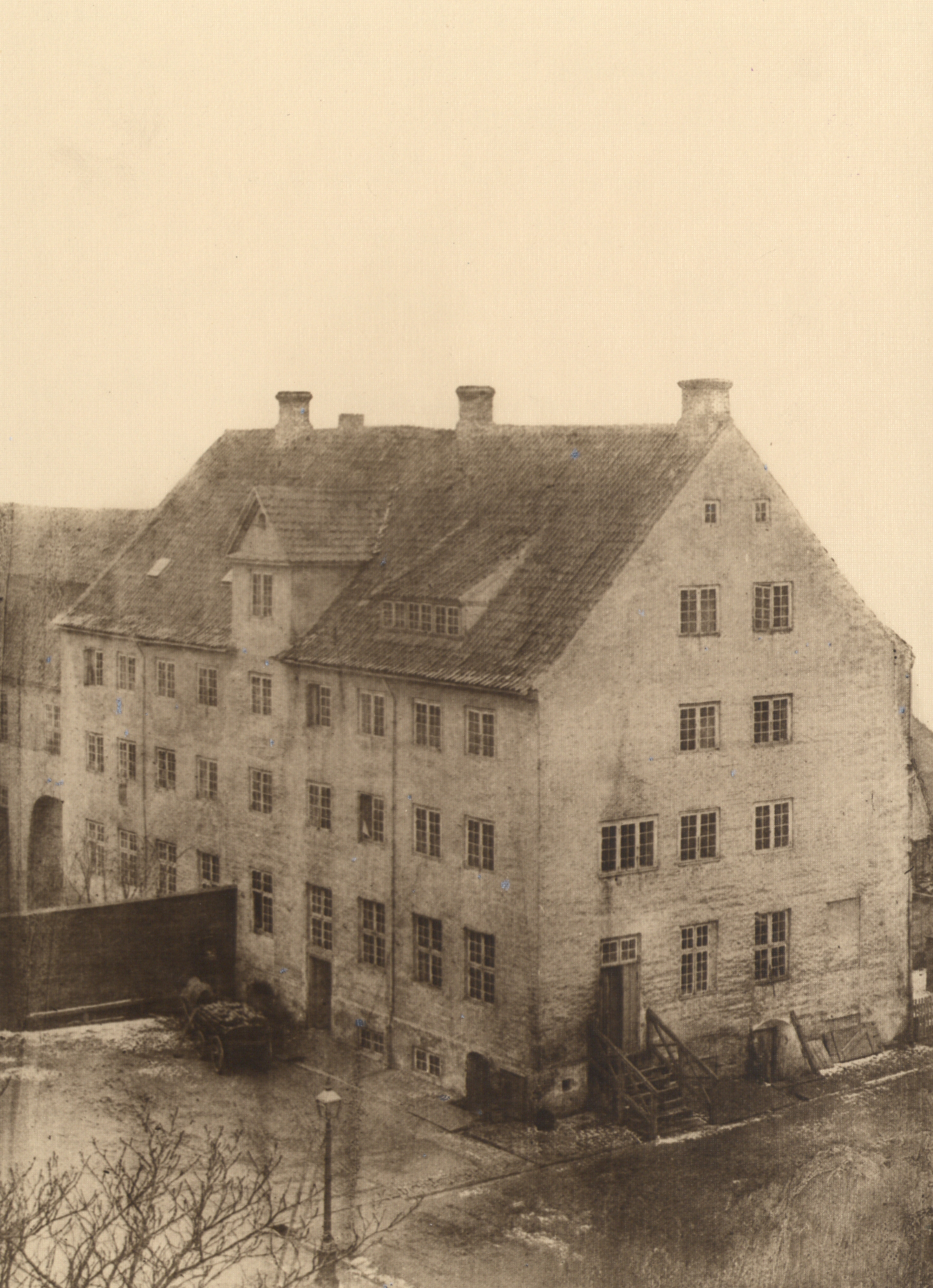
The Poor Authority's Boys' School in the 1860s

The site was from 1730 occupied by a large garden known as Magister Knud Tommerups Have. Knud Tommerup—the wealthiest clergyman in Copenhagen—served as pastor of the Church of the Holy Ghost from 1726. The garden survived until 1807 when Holmen's Work House was built on the grounds. The building was later taken over by the Poor Authority's boys' school on Sankt Annæ Plads.

In 1881, it was divided into parcels and sold to master joiner A. C. Rasmussen. The two buildings at No. 63 and No. 65 were constructed in 1886–87 to designs by the architect Ferdinand Vilhelm Jensen.

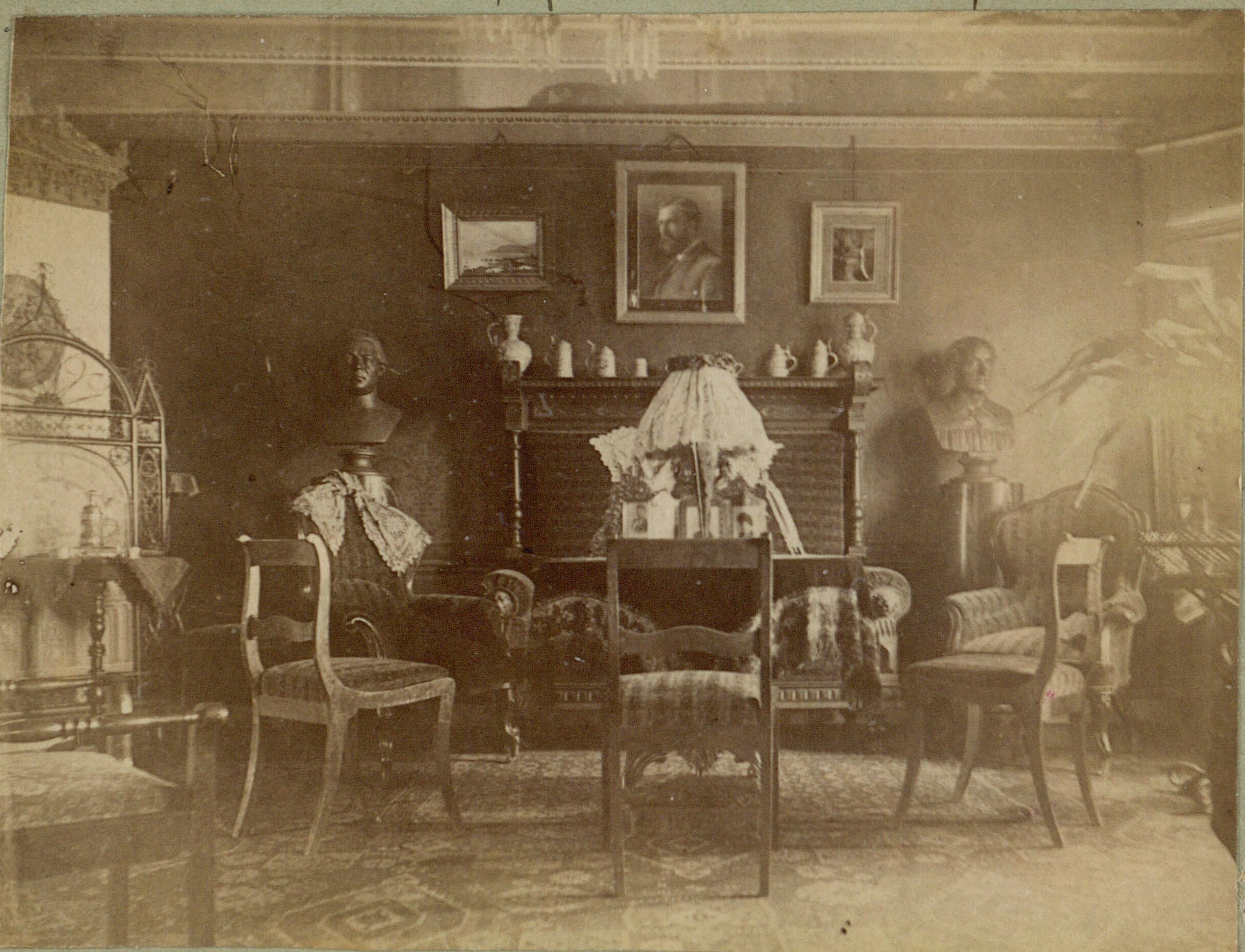
Algæt and Ina Lange's living room at No. 63, c. 1888

The Swedish opera singer Algot Lange and the pianist Ina Lange were among the residents at No. 63. The painter Carl Locher lived in an apartment on the fourth floor in the rear wing of No. 63 in the years around 1889. The painter Erik Henningsen's studio was from 1890 also located in the rear wing at No, 63. His home was from 1886 to 1890 located at Store Kongensgade 90 and then from 1891 to 1903 at Gothersgade 156.

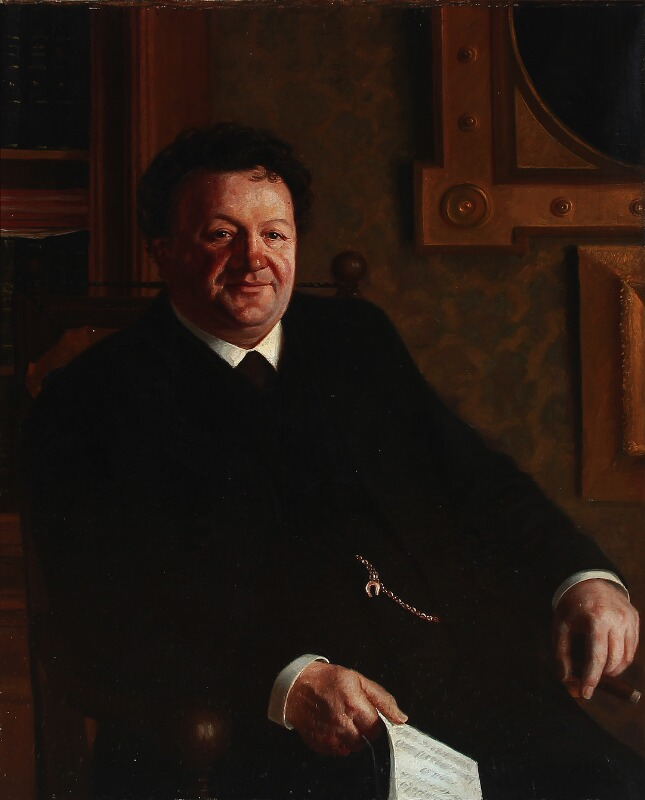
Olaf Poulsen, painted by Heinrich Dohm in 1895

The actor Olaf Poulsen resided on the fourth floor at No. 65 from 1889 to 1903. The painter August Tørsleff lived on the third floor of the rear wing in the years around 1908. The painter Heinrich Dohm—who had painted a portrait painting of Olaf Poulsen while he lived in the building in 1895—was from 1907 until 1923 himself a resident on the first floor of the rear wing at No. 65A. Carl Theodor Zahle had his winter home on the third floor of No. 63 from 1811 to 1813 whilst he was serving as mayor and herredsfoged of Stege on Møn.

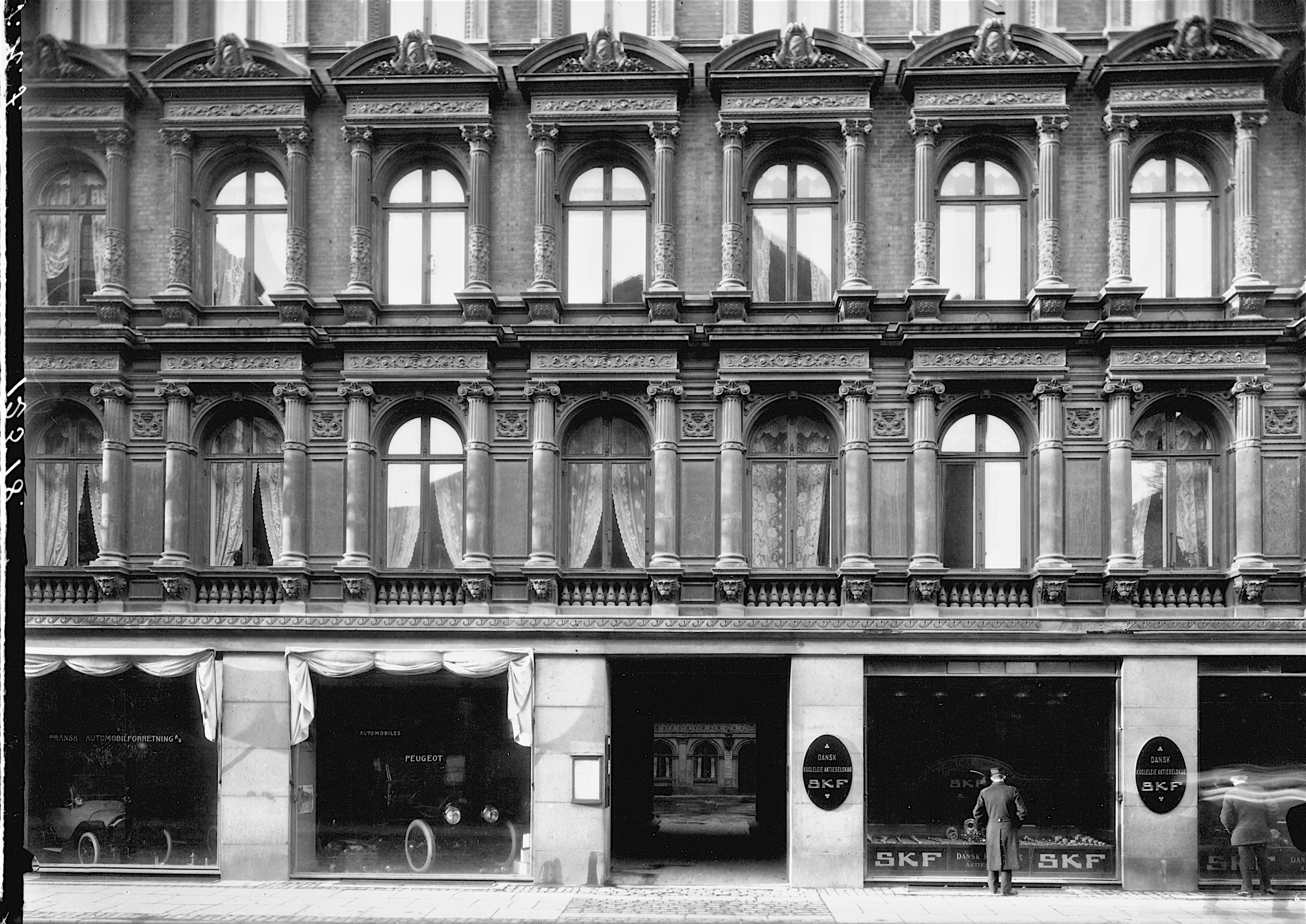
No. 63, photographed by Peter Elfelt in 1914

Commercial tenants have included the Danish subsidiary of SKF and a Peugeot car dealer, both of which were located in the ground floor of No. 63 in the 1910s. The furniture maker Johannes Hansen had a furniture shop at No. 76 in the 1840s. In the 1970s, Hotel Viking was based at No. 65.

In 1997, Francis Cardenau opened Restaurant Le Sommelier at No. 63. It closed in 2018.

== Architecture ==
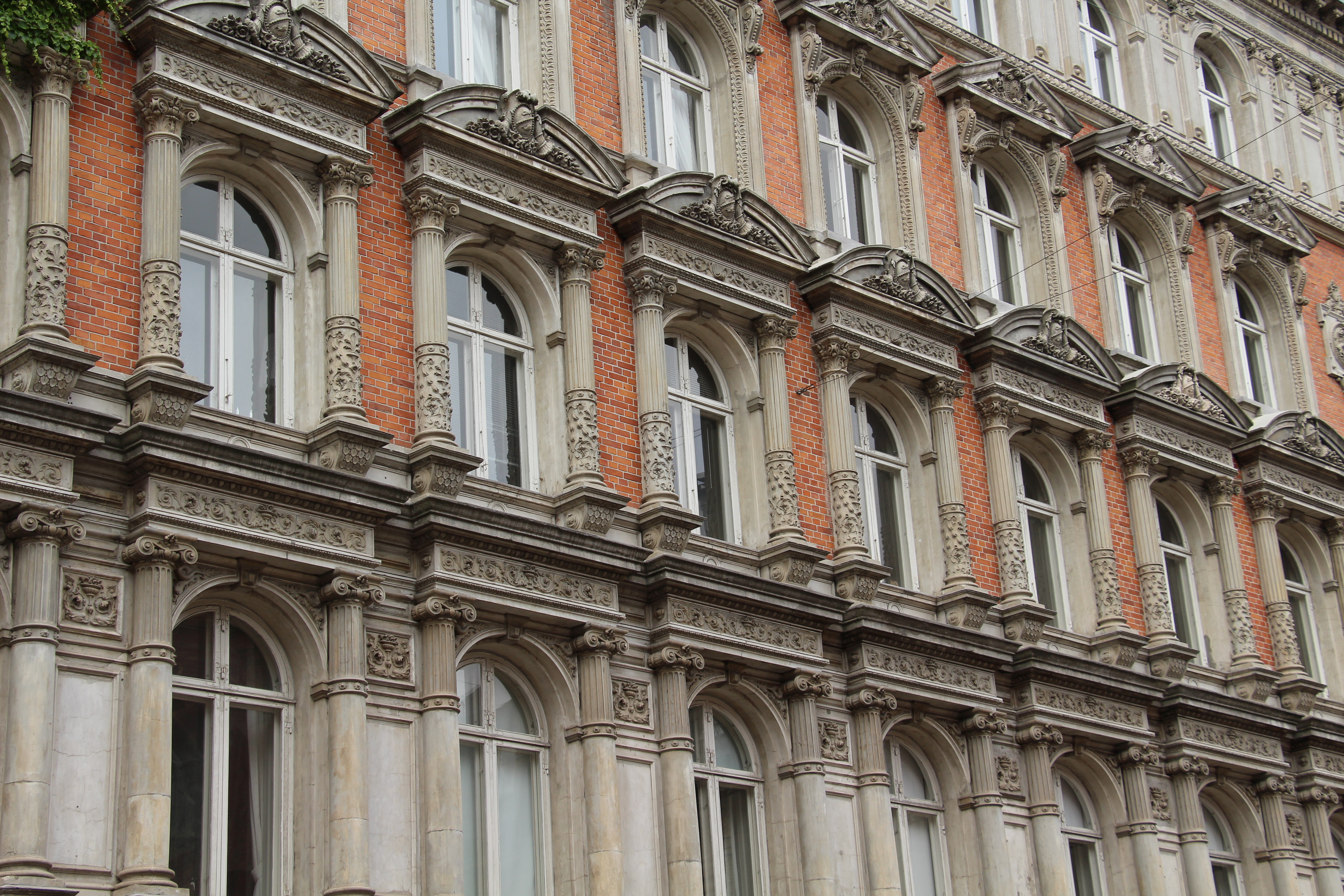
Close-up of the facade on the second and third floor

Bredgade 63–65 is designed in the Renaissance Revival style. Each of the two identical properties consists of four wings, eight bays wide towards the street, surrounding a central courtyard. The entire complex was originally five storeys tall but a recessed penthouse storey fronted by a rooftop terrace towards the street has been added. The buildings are constructed in red brick with a wealth of decorative elements in sandstone or concrete. The facade is finished by a heavy cornice supported by corbels. The windows on the first to third floors are flanked by engaged columns carrying richly decorated lintels. The windows on the second floor are topped by broken, rounded pediments while the ones on the third floor are triangular pediments. The windows on the fourth floor are flanked by pilasters. Rows of balusters are seen under the windows on the first floor. The southern corner of No. 73 is accentuated by buttresses. The margin between No. 63 and No. 65 features two cartouches with the letter "R"—for the developer's name, Rasmussen—on the second and third floor. A gateway in the two central bays of both buildings provide access to the two courtyards.

== Today ==
In January 2003, Jeudan acquired Bredgade 63–65 from Nordea Ejendomme as part of a larger portfolio of properties in central Copenhagen. The Embassy of Mexico is based at No. 65.

== See also ==
- Brønnum House
- Søtorvet
