= André Salvat =

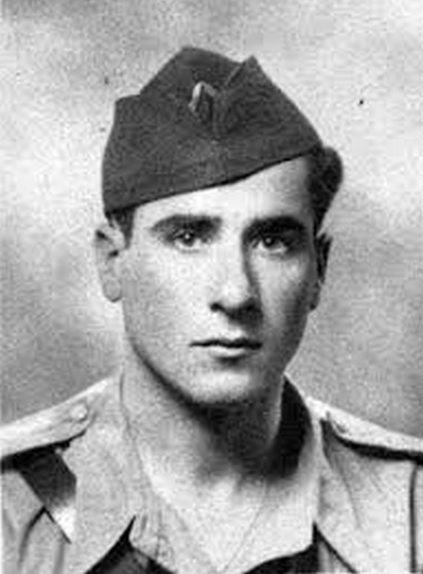
- Born: 16 May 1920; Prades, Pyrénées-Orientales, France
- Died: 9 February 2017 (aged 96) Perpignan, France
- Allegiance: France; Free France
- Branch: Army
- Service years: 1938–1973
- Rank: Colonel
- Awards: Legion of Honour; Order of Liberation; Croix de Guerre; Colonial Medal; Médaille Commémorative de la Campagne d'Indochine; Croix de la Vaillance Vietnamienne; Croix Militaire de 1ère classe

André Salvat (16 May 1920 – 9 February 2017) was a colonel in the French Army. He was a veteran of World War II, the First Indochina War and the Algerian War. He was made a Companion of the Liberation for his World War II service.

== Early life ==
André Salvat was born on 16 May 1920 in Prades near Perpignan. His father was a veteran of World War I and his mother was a shopkeeper. He was educated in a military preparatory school in Perpignan.

== World War II ==
Salvat joined the French Army in May 1938. By July 1939, he was a sergeant under General Eugène Mittelhauser, stationed in Tripoli, Libya. Salvat refused to accept the armistice of 22 June 1940 and joined the Free France forces in Mandatory Palestine under Captain Raphaël Folliot. Stationed in Moascar, Egypt, he fought in the Battle of Sidi Barrani, Sollum, Bardia, the Siege of Tobruk, Benghazi and El Agueila under Lieutenant Roger Barberot. He fought in the First Battle of El Alamein in Egypt in July 1942 under General Marie-Pierre Kœnig and the Second Battle of El Alamein in October–November 1942. He became a lieutenant in December 1943 and fought in the Italian campaign. He subsequently received the Colonial Medal for his service in Libya.

Salvat returned to France on 17 August 1944, landing in Provence, where he joined the French Resistance. He subsequently fought in the Battle of Alsace and the Battle of Authion. He became a Companion of the Liberation for his service. He also received the Croix de Guerre.

== Post-WWII military career ==
Salvat taught at Coëtquidan in 1945. He served in the army in Morocco, Senegal and the Republic of the Congo until October 1953, when he joined the First Indochina War. He was wounded in battle four times and captured and imprisoned for three months in 1954. He was awarded the Médaille Commémorative de la Campagne d'Indochine and the Croix de la Vaillance Vietnamienne for his service.

Salvat served in the Algerian War from 1954 to 1962, where he was General Raymond Delange's aide-de-camp.

Salvat was stationed in Baden-Baden and Berlin, Germany in 1962–1966. He served in Kinshasa, Zaire (now known as the Democratic Republic of the Congo) from 1967 to 1971. He was awarded the Croix Militaire de 1ère classe for his service in Zaire. He returned to France, where he was stationed from 1971 to 1973.

Salvat retired in April 1973. He became a Grand Officer of the Legion of Honour.

== Death ==
Salvat died on 9 February 2017 in Perpignan, at the age 96. Upon his death, Jean-Marc Todeschini, the French Secretary of Veteran Affairs and Remembrance, called him an "exemplary resistant, who proved to be tirelessly brave and determined in his commitment to his service of France. His fight in the French Free Forces honours and obliges us all."
