= DeLange =

DeLange is a contraction of the Dutch surname De Lange (meaning "the tall one"). It may refer to:

- Eddie DeLange, American bandleader
- Ilse DeLange, Dutch singer
- François Delange, Belgian physician and thyroid researcher
- Raymond Delange (1898-1976), French Army general
