= Johannes Hansen (manufacturer) =

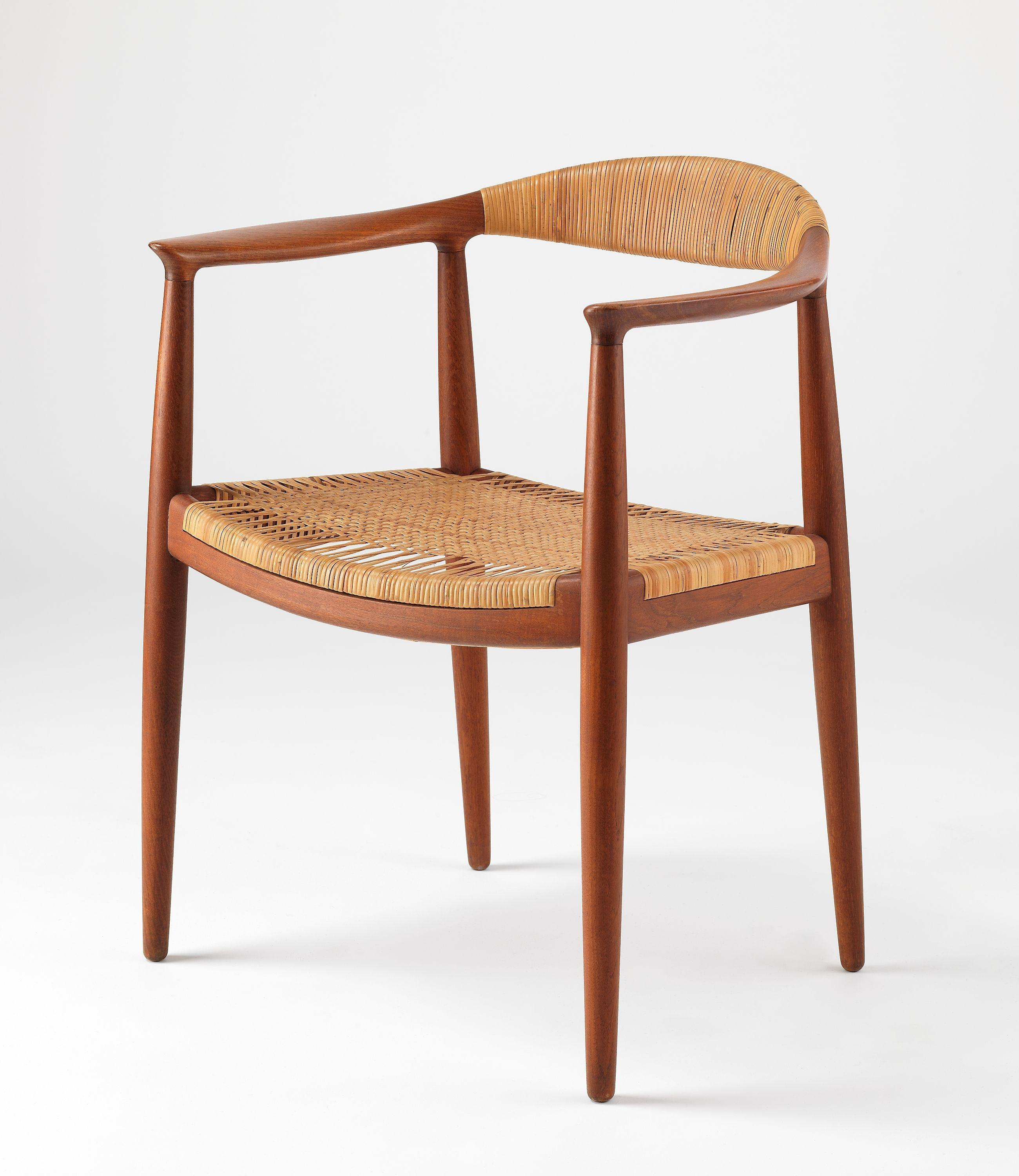
Hans Wegner's Round Chair, produced by Johannes Hansen

Johannes Hansen (1886–1961) was a Danish furniture maker and founder of the eponymous company (Johannes Hansen Møbelsnedkeri A/S) that manufactured furniture from the 1940s to the 1990s. He was a founder and for a time the chairman of the Copenhagen Cabinet Maker's Guild.

His best-known products were designed by Hans Wegner, whom he met in 1940 and with whom he (and his company) was to collaborate for the next three decades. By that time, Hansen was in his 50s, and had a store at Bredgade 65 in Copenhagen. As the cabinetmaker, his side of the partnership with Wegner is less well known outside of Denmark.

He died in 1961. His youngest son, Poul Hansen, took over the company and continued to collaborate with Wegner. The company eventually went bankrupt in the 1990s.

== Reference bibliography ==
- Byars, Mel (2004). "Hansen, Johannes". In Riley, Terence (ed.). The Design Encyclopedia (2nd ed.). L. King. p. 304. ISBN 9780870700125.
- "Om brdr. friis møbler" (in Danish). Brdr. Friis Møbler.
- "En samtale med Hans J. Wegner og snedkermester". Snedkeren (in Danish). Snedkerforbundet. 1965. pp. 112 et seq.
- Doblin, Jay (1970). One Hundred Great Product Designs. Van Nostrand Reinhold Company. ISBN 9780442113476.
- Mussari, Mark (2016). "A history of ideas: constructing Danish Modern". Danish Modern: Between Art and Design. Bloomsbury Publishing. ISBN 9781474223683.
