= Jakob Immanuel Pyra =

German poet (1715–1744)

Jakob Immanuel Pyra (1715-1744) was a German poet.

== Biography ==
He was born in Cottbus in the Margraviate of Brandenburg, studied theology at Halle, where he joined Lange's Dichterbund, and lived with Lange in Laublingen. The two poets published Freundschaftliche Lieder (1746), which, with their delight in friendship and their unrhymed verse, foretell Klopstock. Pyra boldly, and rather pedantically, attacked Gottsched in 1736 with Erweis dass die Gottschedianische Sekte den Geschmack verderbe (1743), and his premature death was partly due to the bitterness with which the attack was returned.
