= The Round Chair =

Chair designed by Hans J. Wegner

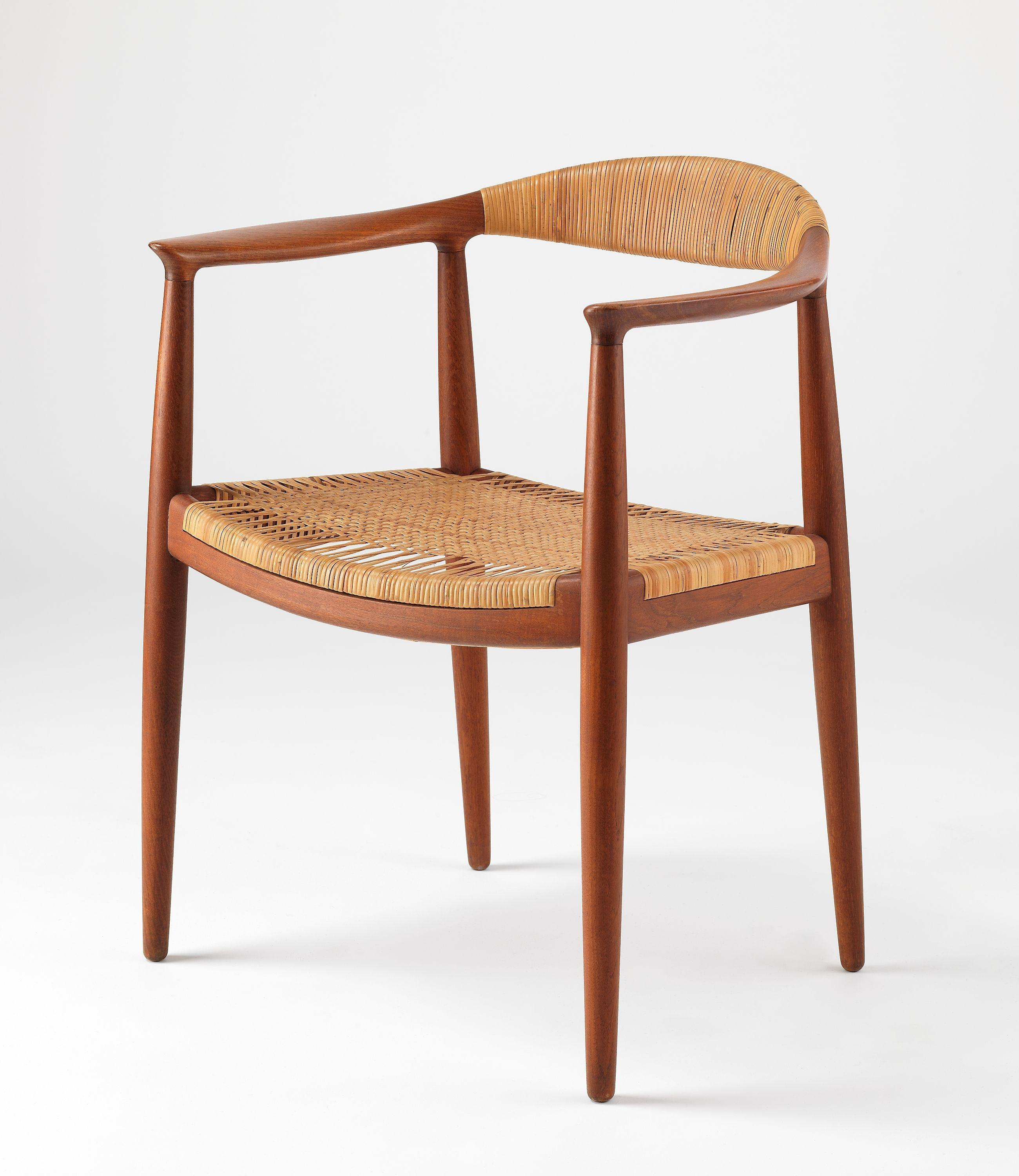
- The Round Chair with caned seat and backrest
- Designer: Hans Wegner
- Date: 1949
- Made in: Denmark
- Style / tradition: Danish

The Round Chair (Danish: Den Runde Stol, also known as The Chair in America, The Classic Chair in Britain, and by the model numbers PP501, PP503, JH501, and JH503) is an armchair designed by Hans Wegner in 1949. The chair was a collaboration of Wegner and the now-defunct furniture maker Johannes Hansen. It is still in production today by the Danish furniture manufacturer PP Møbler.

The chair features back and armrests made from one continuous semicircle. The finger joints orient the wood grain as the back rail wraps around the body to maximize material strength. The chair is offered with a solid upholstered seat (PP503) or a seat of woven caning (PP501).

"Many foreigners have asked me, how we created the 'Danish Modern' style. And I have to say that it was nothing like that – creating ... I suppose it was more an advanced process of purifying and for me simplification, cutting the elements down to the bare essentials: Four legs, a seat and a combined back and arm rest – The Chair."

— Hans J. Wegner on creating the chair

== History and cultural impact ==
In 1949, Wegner planned to present two chairs to display at the annual exhibition of the Copenhagen Cabinetmakers' Guild (Danish: Snedkerlauget): the tripartite plywood shell chair and the Folding Chair (JH512). His employer, Johannes Hansen, felt that there were too many plywood chairs on display and instructed Wegner to create a more traditional chair. Wegner created the Round Chair in only 48 hours.

The Danish press that attended the event initially paid attention to the tripartite chair. Plywood had become popularized as a furniture material by the Eames and Alvar Alto and they were drawn to the dramatic designs of this new lamination technology. Due to the high production cost, the tripartite chair prototype would never go into production but would remain in Wegner's home.

While the tripartite chair had captured the attention of the Danish press, American journalists attended the event for the first time and were drawn to the traditional design of the Round Chair instead of the innovative design of the plywood chair. The American journalists shared the news of this chair back home and it was the subject of much attention internationally. The year the chair was created, the American magazine Interiors featured the chair and christened it "most beautiful chair in the world." This was the first coverage of Danish Modern in the American press. The article included the following caption, "In this oak desk chair Mr. Wegner uses a simple construction and devotes himself to perfecting the shape and scale of the parts. [...] The sturdy legs are tapered just enough to seem muscular rather than overfed and the seat dips slightly to look willing but not seductive."

Unlike the Wishbone Chair that was created later that year, the design of the Round Chair was not created with mass production in mind. As such, the chair took many hours to construct and Johannes Hansen struggled to fulfill the early orders. A Downtown Chicago club attempted to order 400 chairs but Johannes Hansen (with only a handful of workers at the time) struggled for two years before being able to complete this order. In 1966, it was cited that Johannes Hansen employed around 30 workers and could only produce three Round Chairs per day.

The Americans came to Denmark to inquire whether they could buy or make some of them. Johannes Hansen's workshop was small, with only five or six assistants. They were not used to producing large numbers. If they could just sell the four chairs we made for the show, we would be happy. The Americans were not satisfied with that. They asked if they could get 400 of them. I could certainly also ask Fritz Hansen—and I did—but Johannes Hansen certainly didn't like that. The Americans wanted to make the chair in the United States. And I didn't like that. It was designed for Danish craftsmen.

— Hans Wegner

Full broadcast of the Kennedy–Nixon debates featuring the chair

In the early models of the chair, Wegner used a mortise and tenon joint to connect the arms to the backrest. Wegner was dissatisfied with the way that this looked and wrapped the backrest in cane to hide what he considered to be an unsightly design and created the illusion that the arms and backrest were constructed from a single piece of wood. In 1950, Wegner updated the design to use a zigzag patterned finger joint to connect the three parts and did away with the cane wrapped backrest (but it continued to be available for special order).

Due to the difference in humidity outside of Denmark, the caning seat would sag over time in the United States. To address this, Johannes Hansen released an upholstered version of the chair. Wegner disliked this compromise and was quoted saying, "If consumers use their head, they will specify leather; but if they use their heart, they will take their chances with the original caned seat."

From November 27, 1951, through January 27, 1952, the chair was featured in the 2nd Good Design exhibition at New York Museum of Modern Art (MoMA) and Chicago's Merchandise Mart. It was added to MoMA's permanent collection a year later.

On September 26, 1960, the chair was prominently on display in the first televised U.S. presidential debate between Richard Nixon and John F. Kennedy. Both presidential candidates sat in The Chair during the debate. This event drew more attention to the chair and the emerging Danish modern furniture trend.

in 1991, the chair was featured on a Danish postage stamp.

== Counterfeits and replicas ==
The high cost and limited availability of this piece of furniture has fueled many imitations and counterfeit replicas. To demonstrate the extent in which the chair was copied, Johannes Hansen presented 12 replicas of the chair at a company event in 1965.

In 2015, a shipment of 100 imitation Round Chairs from China were seized and destroyed by Norwegian customs. The Norwegian restaurant that ordered the knockoffs were forced to pay for the cost of the destruction.

== Gallery ==
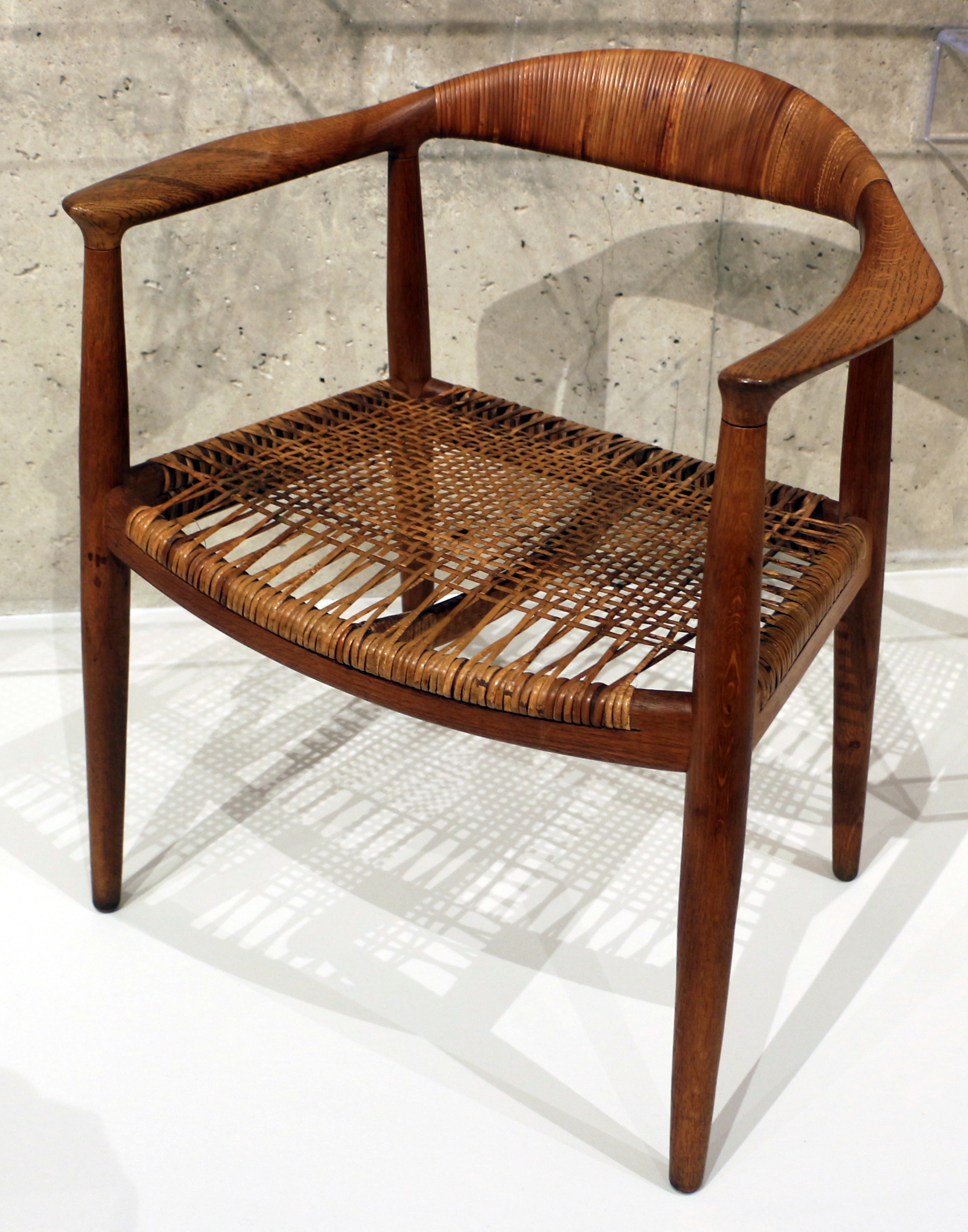
Chair with caned seat and backrest

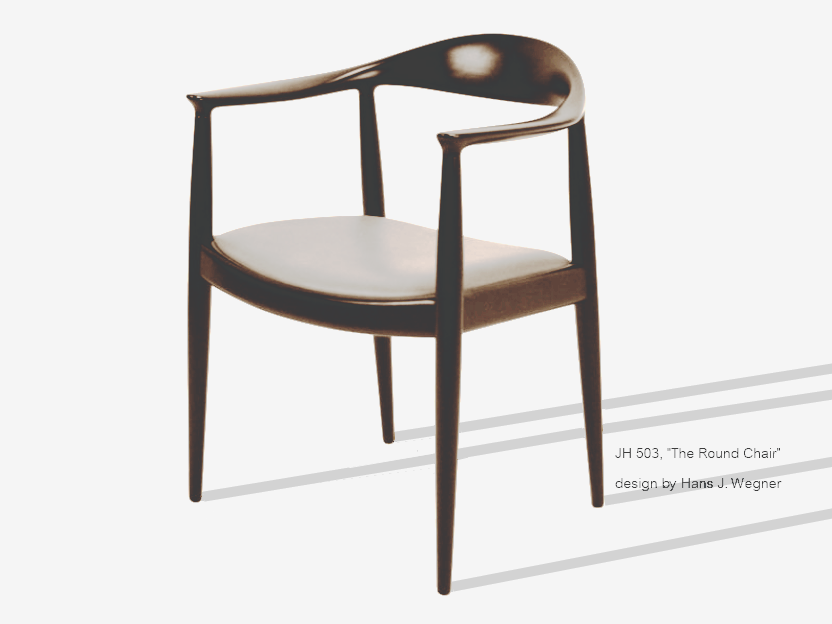
Chair with upholstered seat

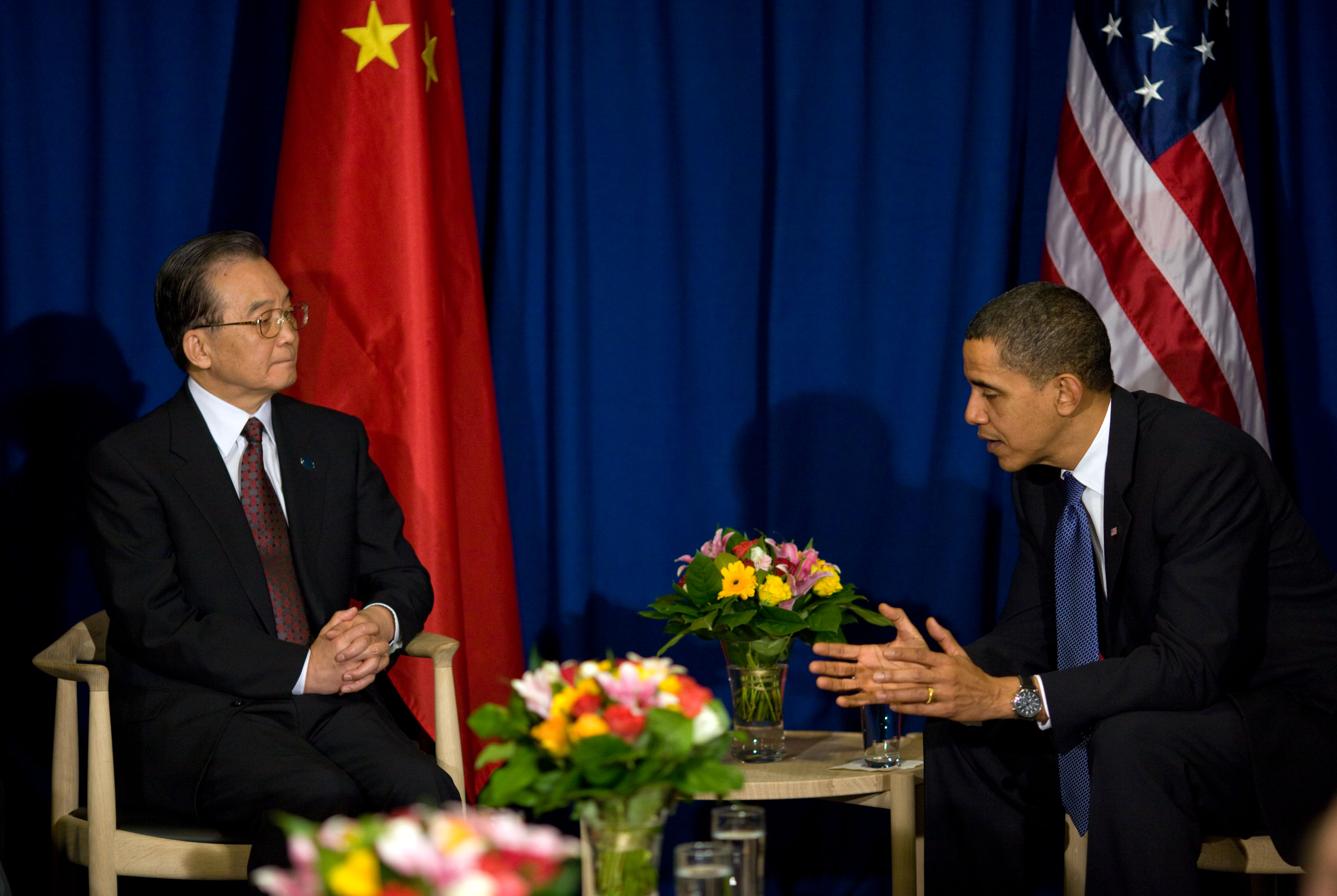
Barack Obama and Wen Jiabao sitting on the Round Chair at the 2009 United Nations Climate Change Conference

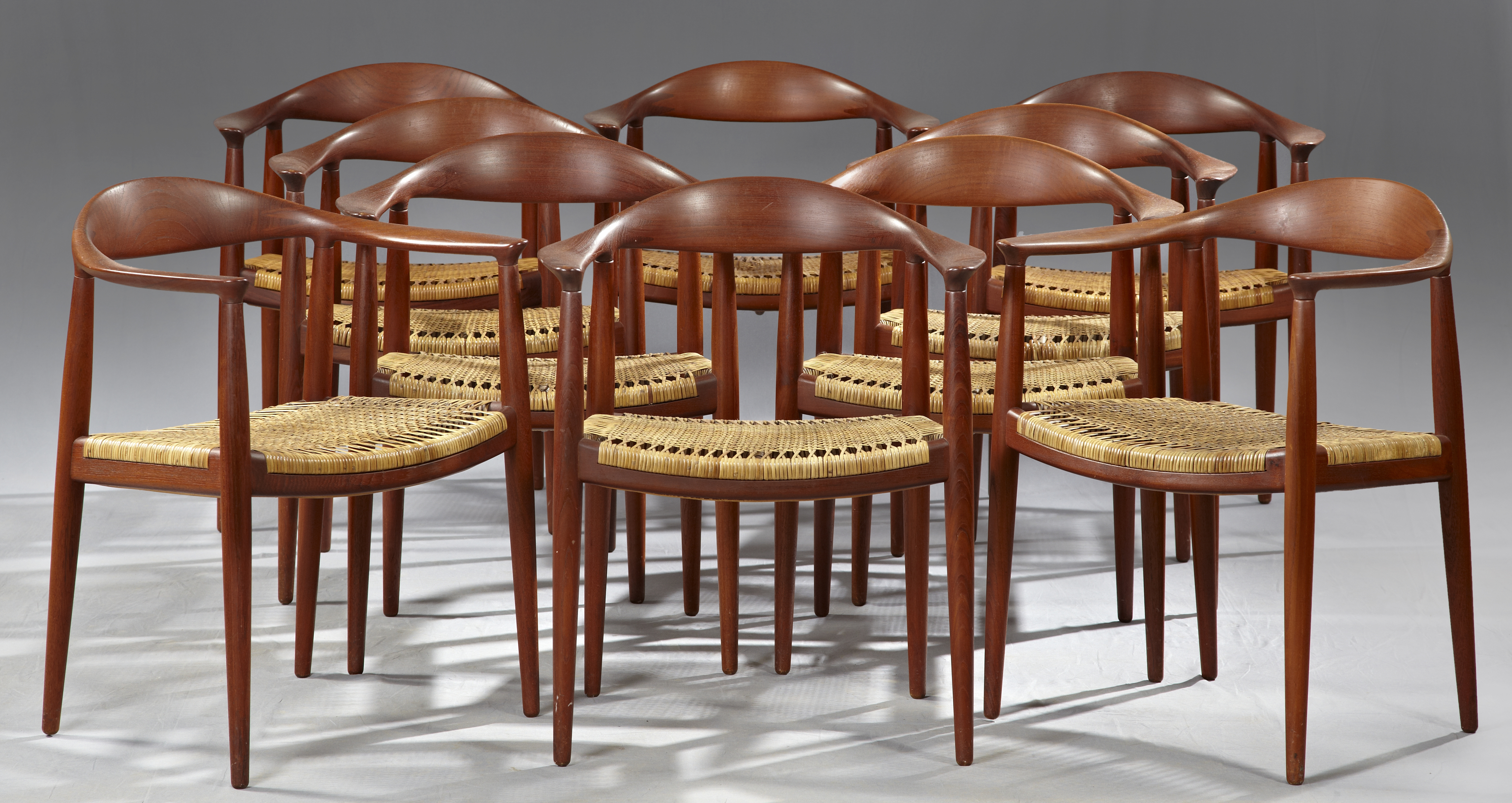

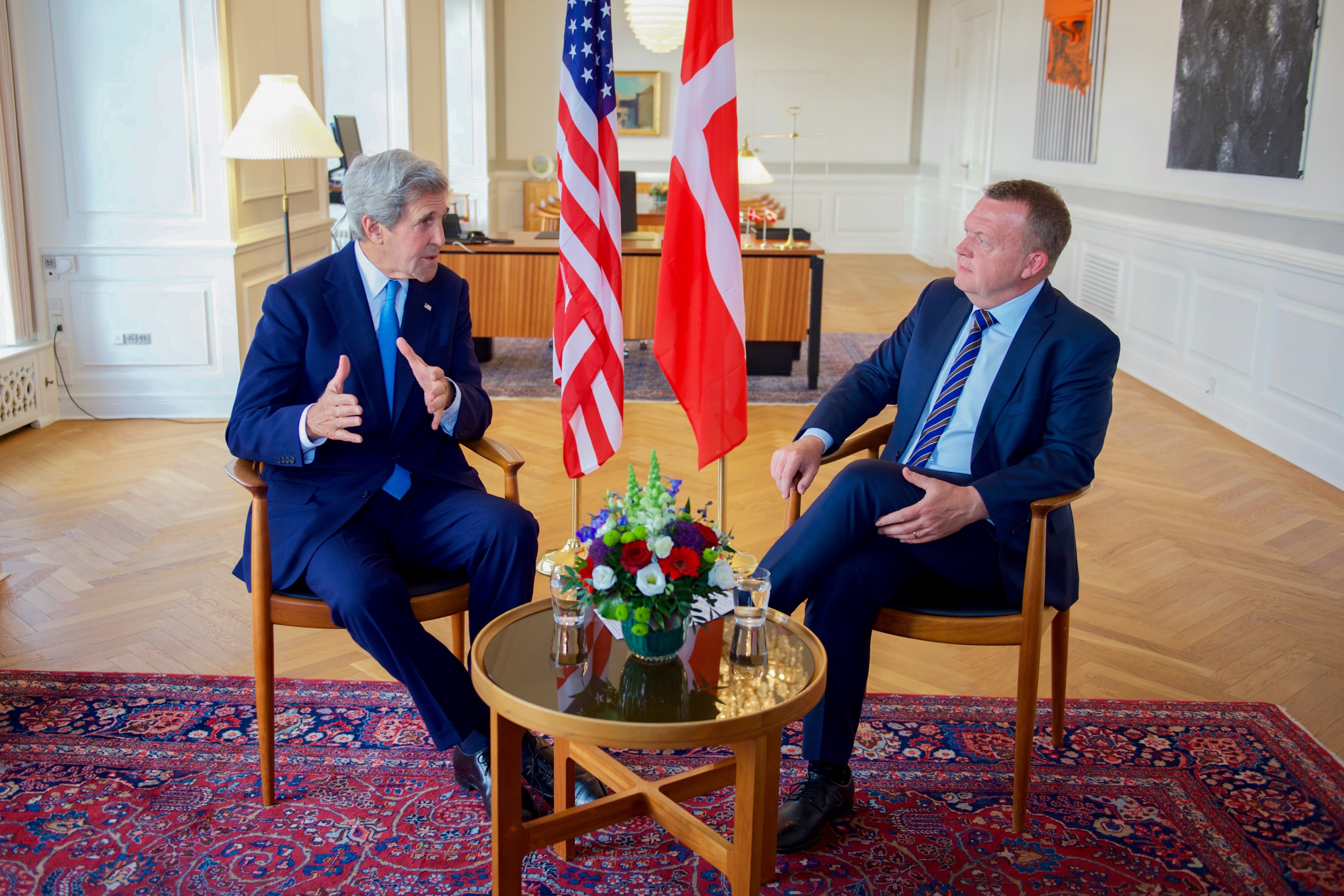
John Kerry and Lars Løkke Rasmussen sitting in the chairs at the Danish Prime Minister's Office in Copenhagen

== See also ==
- List of chairs
