= Cornelia Catharina de Lange =

Dutch pediatrician (1871–1950)

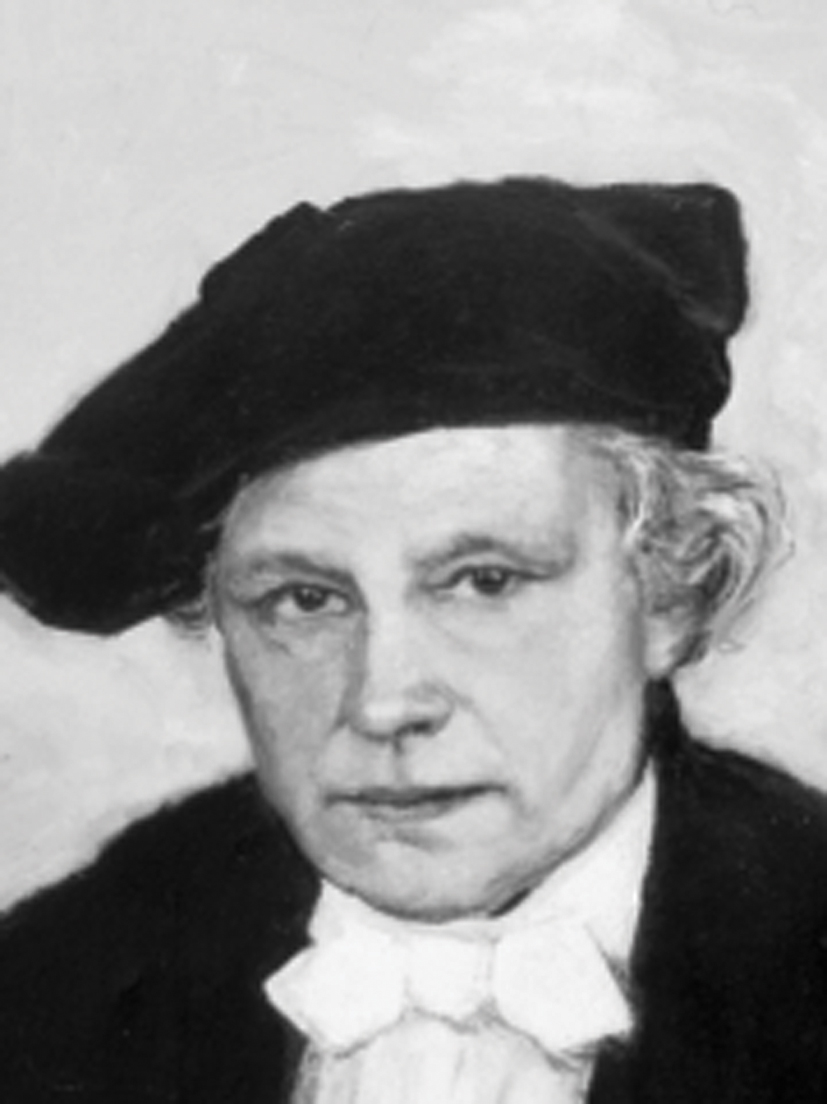
- Born: 24 June 1871; Alkmaar, North Holland
- Died: 28 January 1950 (aged 78); Amsterdam, Holland
- Education: University of Amsterdam
- Occupations: Pediatrician and neuropathologist
- Known for: Cornelia de Lange syndrome
- Awards: Order of Orange-Nassau

Cornelia Catharina de Lange (24 June 1871 – 28 January 1950) was a Dutch pediatrician and neuropathologist who along with Winfried Brachmann first described the genetic disorder named after her, the Cornelia de Lange syndrome.

== Life ==
Born in Alkmaar to Catharina Jacoba Luchtmans, her mother, and Adrianus Petrus de Lange, a prominent lawyer in the city, de Lange was pushed to pursue an education in chemistry by her father. She enrolled in the University of Zurich to study chemistry but changed her focus to medicine in 1892. She graduated from the University of Amsterdam in 1897, becoming the fifth woman physician to qualify in the Netherlands. However, because pediatrics did not exist as a specialty in the Netherlands, De Lange moved to Switzerland, where she worked in the children's hospital in Zürich under Oskar Wyss. She then returned to Amsterdam and practiced at Emma Kinderziekenhuis (Emma Children's Hospital).

De Lange worked in all aspects of pediatrics. During her 50 years of practice she collected multiple observations of pediatric disorders. De Lange also became interested in congenital disorders and their pediatric relevance as theories on human genetics developed during the 1920s and 1930s. In 1933, De Lange described what she called "typus degenerativus Amstelodamensis" (Amsterdam degeneration type) in two children, which became known as Cornelia de Lange syndrome.

She was knighted in 1947 by the Dutch government as a member of the Order of Orange-Nassau. She died in Amsterdam at the age of 78.
