= Johann Joachim Lange =

German Protestant theologian (1670–1744)

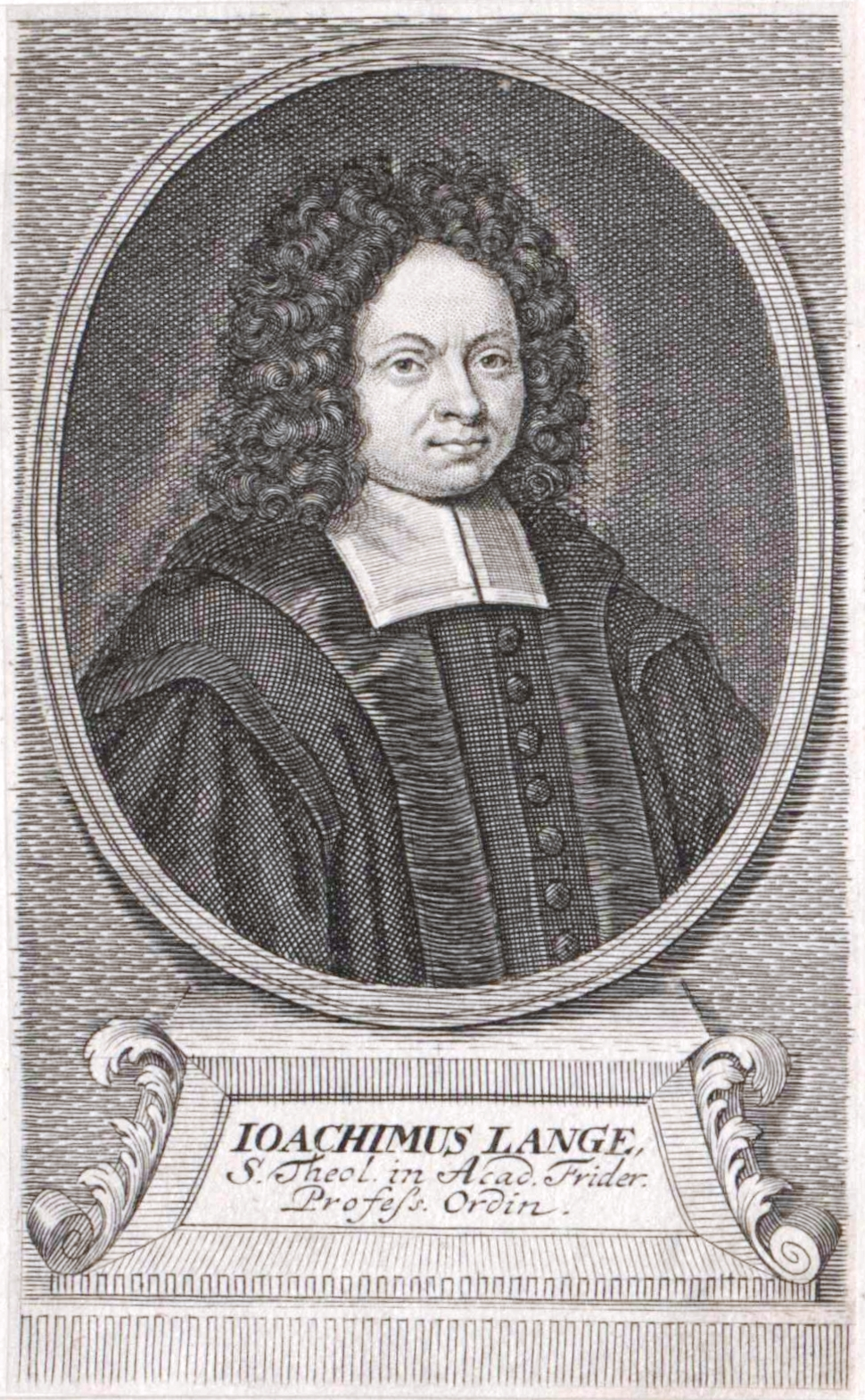
Johann Joachim Lange

Johann Joachim Lange (German: [ˈlaŋə]; 26 October 1670 – 7 May 1744) was a German Lutheran theologian and philosopher.

== Biography ==
Lange was born in Gardelegen and educated in Leipzig, Erfurt and Halle.

He was influenced by Christian Thomasius and the Pietist August Hermann Francke. He became a professor of theology at Halle in 1709, and opposed the philosophy of Christian Wolff. He died in Halle on 7 May 1744.

Lange wrote the hymn "O God, what offering shall I give?", translated into English by John Wesley in 1739.

Lange's son, Samuel Gotthold Lange, was a noted poet.

== Works ==
- Medicina mentis, 1704
- Causa dei et religionis naturalis adversum atheismus, 1723
- Modesta Disqvisitio Novi Philosophiæ Systematis De Deo, Mvndo Et Homine, Et Præsertim De Harmonia Commercii Inter Animam Et Corpvs Præstabilita; Cvm Epicrisi In Viri Cvivsdam Clarissimi Commentationem; De Differentia Nexvs Rervm Sapientis Et Fatalis Necessitatis, Nec Non Systematis Harmoniæ ..., 1723
