= Algot Lange =

Swedish explorer

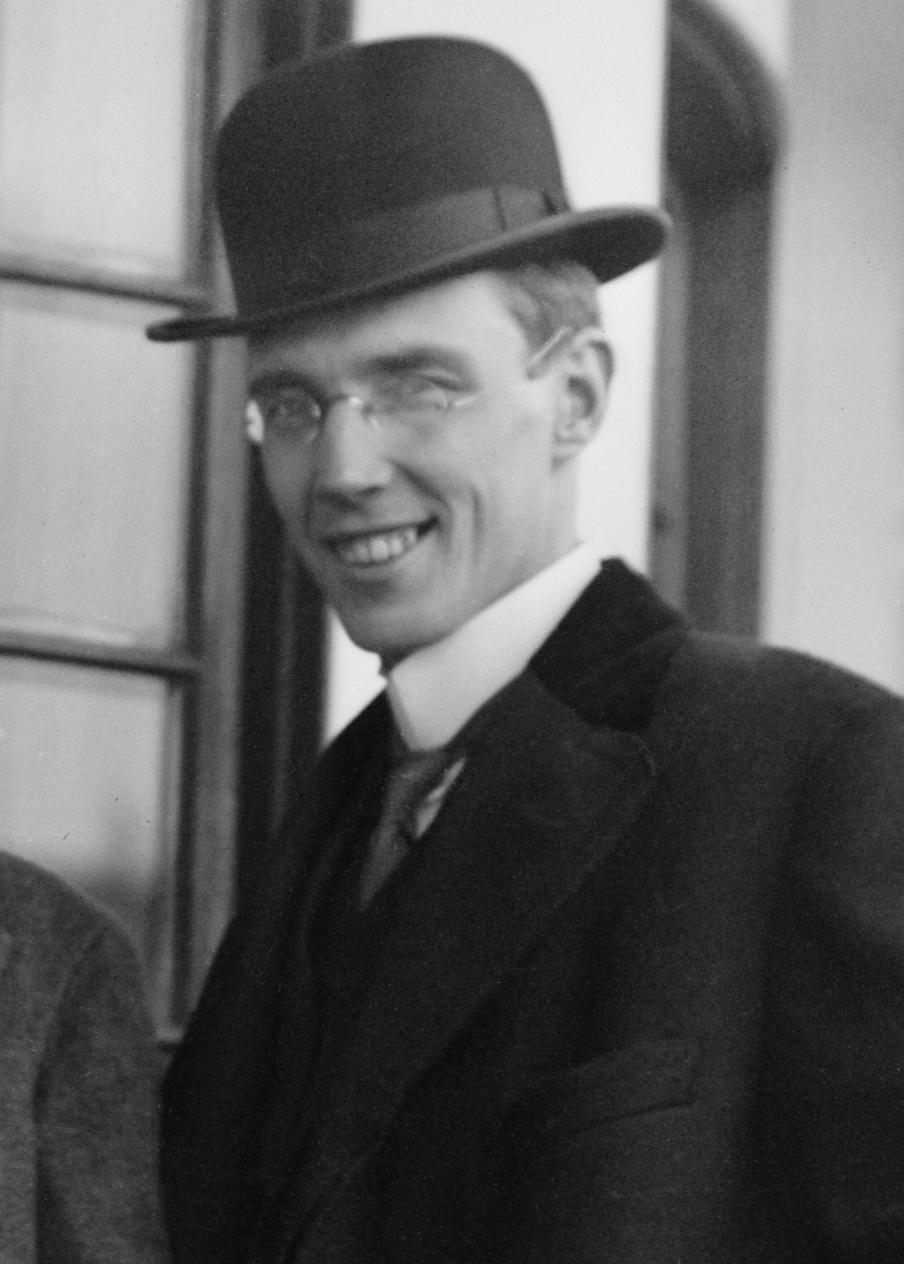
Algot Lange, c. 1910 – c. 1915

Åke Algot Lange (born Åke Mortimer Lange; 10 May 1884 – 21 February 1961) was a Swedish-American explorer who wrote books about the Amazon.

== Biography ==
Lange was born in Stockholm as Åke Mortimer Lange, but later he took his father's name as his middle name. His parents were the opera singer Algot Lange and the pianist and author Ina Lange née Forstén.

He collected 2,000 pottery fragments from Pacoval Island in Lake Arary on Marajo Island, which were acquired by the American Museum of Natural History in 1915.

Lange immigrated to the United States in 1904 and became a U.S. citizen in 1915. He died in 1961 in New York City.

== Publications ==
- In the Amazon jungle: adventures in remote parts of the upper Amazon river (1912) with J. Odell Hauser and Frederick Samuel Dellenbaugh
- The Lower Amazon: a narrative of explorations in the little known regions (1914): Supplements In the Amazon jungle "with a most readable account of the new explorations and discoveries in this enormously rich but little known country. Profusely illustrated."
