= François Delange =

Belgian physician

- Born: 1935; Ixelles, Belgium
- Died: June 2007 (aged 71–72)
- Medical career
- Profession: Endocrinologist
- Sub-specialties: Thyroid research, pediatrics

François Delange (1935 - June 2007) was a Belgian physician and researcher who contributed to thyroid research. He performed field studies on goiter prevalence worldwide and performed pioneering research in early screening for congenital hypothyroidism.

Delange studied at the Free University of Brussels (ULB) and graduated as M.D. in 1960. In 1973, he completed his Ph.D. thesis entitled Etude d'une endémie goitreuse en Afrique Centrale: Influence de la croissance et des facteurs d'environnement sur la fonction thyroïdienne. He spent most of his professional career at the University Hospital Saint Pierre, eventually becoming Chief of Clinic and Professor of Pediatrics at the ULB, until he retired at the age of 60 years, in 1995.

After his graduation as M.D., he joined the lab of André Ermans in the University Hospital Saint-Pierre and focused his studies on the study of goiter and iodine deficiency in Central Africa. He was most active in the region of the former Zaire, performing over 30 research journeys between 1965 and 1982. He studied the iodine deficiency on a population level and showed role of cassava (manioc) and thiocyanate in endemic goiter and worked on the use of iodized oil in iodine deficiency disorders prevention.

Delange also performed research for neonatal screening for congenital hypothyroidism, using TSH levels as a marker for hypothyroidism.

Furthermore, Delange was promoting ThyroMobil, an initiative to perform standardized thyroid volume measurement and urine iodine concentrations all over the world.

Delange was a member of the International Council for the Control of Iodine Deficiency Disorders (ICCIDD) and served as board member since its foundation in 1986. He was working as the executive director of ICCIDD between 1995 and 2001.

During his career, Delange authored or co-authored 12 books and 361 publications, also he presented more than 200 communications at international meetings.

== Awards ==
- Herman Houtman Belgian Foundation award in 1997 (for his research in pediatrics)
- ETA Merck prize in 1997
- ICCIDD award in 2007 for his continuous effort to eradicate iodine deficiency disorders worldwide
- Doctor Honoris Causa from the Charles University (Prague, Czech Republic) in 1998
- Doctor Honoris Causa from the Jagiellonian University (Kraków, Poland) in 1999
