= Samuel Gotthold Lange =

German poet (1711–1781)

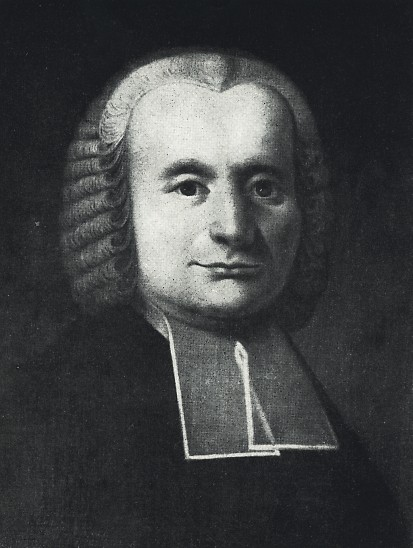
- Portrait by an unknown artist in 1758

Samuel Gotthold Lange (German: [ˈlaŋə]; 22 March 1711, Halle an der Saale – 25 June 1781, Beesenlaublingen) was a German writer.

== Biography ==
He was the son of the Pietist Joachim Lange. He studied theology at Halle, and there became acquainted with Pyra, with whom he wrote Thyrsis' und Damons freundschaftliche Lieder (1745), attacked Gottsched, whom they had both ardently followed before, and opposed the use of rhyme in poetry. His strongest claim to fame is a version of Horace's Odes (1752), which Lessing criticised.
