= Julius Lange (painter) =

German painter

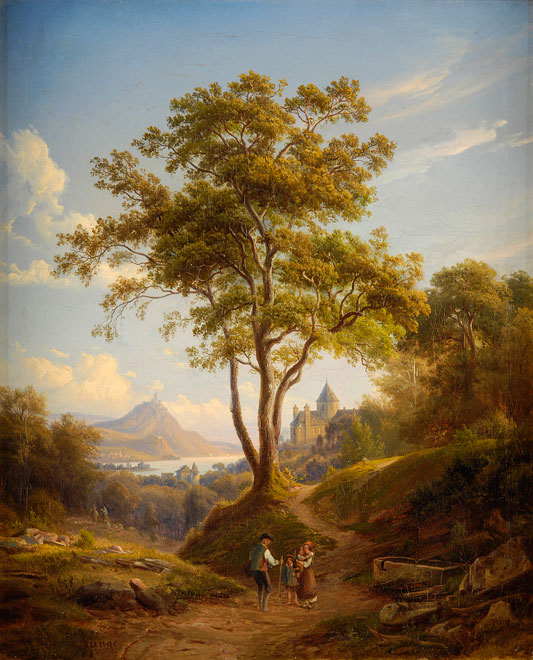
Am Rhein bei Nonnenwerth (1850)

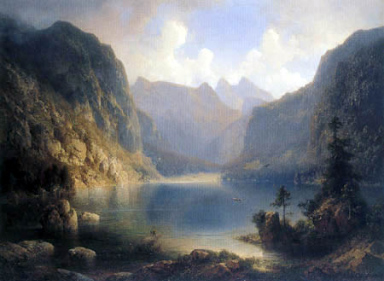
Alpenseepanorama (1859)

Julius Lange (17 August 1817, Darmstadt – 25 June 1878, Munich) was a German landscape painter.

== Life and work ==
Lange had three elder brothers, the scholar Georg Lange (1804–1843), the architect and painter Ludwig Lange, and the publisher and bookseller Gustav Georg Lange (1812–1873), who all together edited since 1832 the series of Originalansichten der vornehmsten Städte in Deutschland, ihrer wichtigsten Dome, Kirchen und sonstigen Baudenkmäler alter und neuer Zeit, to which he himself had been contributing since 1836. In 1834, inspired by his older brother, the architect Ludwig Lange, he attended the Academy of Fine Arts Munich as a historical painter. After only a short time, however, from 1836 to 1839, he switched to the Düsseldorf Art Academy, becoming a landscape painter as a student of Johann Wilhelm Schirmer, whose support enabled him to establish himself in Munich since 1840. Once there, his financial success was ensured by a number of sizable commissions and stays abroad in Milan and Venice: the Accademia di Belle Arti di Venezia ordered a series of sketches to be used in their landscape painting classes, and the Brera Academy in Milan requested two large canvases. While there, he sought out contacts at the court and served as Art Instructor to the Archduchess Charlotte of Belgium until 1858. In 1850, he married Emilie Henriette Bettinger; they had one daughter, Elisabeth.

At that time, family affairs forced him to return to Munich and, once again, he made contacts with royalty. Since 1868, he held the position of a court painter in Munich, and painted many works for both King Maximilian II and his son King Ludwig II as well as interior design studies for the royal castles at Herrenchiemsee and Linderhof.

Like his older brother Ludwig Lange, he is buried in the Old South Cemetery (Alter Südfriedhof) in Munich.
