= Thor Lange =

Thor Lange may refer to:

- Thor Lange (writer) (1851–1915), Danish writer
- Thor Lange (footballer) (born 1993), Danish-Norwegian footballer
