= Corinna Lange =

German politician (born 1986)

Member of the Landtag of Lower Saxony
- Incumbent
- Assumed office 8 November 2022
- Preceded by: Tatjana Maier-Keil
- Constituency: Stade

Personal details
- Born: 16 December 1986 (age 39)
- Party: Social Democratic Party (since 2017)

Corinna Lange (born 16 December 1986) is a German politician serving as a member of the Landtag of Lower Saxony since 2022. She has served as secretary of the Landtag since 2022.
