= Carl Lange =

Carl Lange may refer to:

- Carl Lange (actor) (1909–1999), German film actor
- Carl Lange (architect) (1828–1900), Danish architect
- Carl Lange (footballer) (born 1998), Danish footballer
- Carl Lange (physician) (1834–1900), Danish physician
- Carl Viggo Lange (1904–1999), Norwegian physician and politician

== See also ==
- Karl Otto Lange (1903–1973), American atmospheric scientist
