= Rik de Lange =

Dutch politician (born 1956)

H. B. I. "Rik" de Lange (born 31 July 1956 in Arnhem) is a Dutch politician. He is a member of the Labour Party, and mayor of the Gelderland municipality Duiven.
