= Heinrich Dohm =

Danish artist

Heinrich August Emil Dohm (27 September 1875, Copenhagen – 28 January 1940, Copenhagen) was a Danish artist who painted portraits and genre works and for a period specialized in religious paintings.

== Biography ==
After serving as a painter's apprentice in 1893, Dohm attended the Danish Academy from 1894 to 1898 where he studied under Otto Bache and Frants Henningsen. He painted mainly portraits, landscapes and genre works but especially from 1900 to 1915 he made many religious paintings. His breakthrough came in 1921 when he painted King Christian X riding his white horse over the border after northern Schleswig rejoined Denmark in 1920. From 1925, he also painted landscapes of Fanø which became increasingly colourful and Impressionistic. Among his most famous works are the altarpiece in Veirup Church: Abrahams vandring til Moria Bjerg (1899), his wall painting in the chapel in Holmens Cemetery: Den store hvide flok (1908–15) and his portrait of Thorvald Stauning (1929).

Dohm travelled to Germany (1895), Paris (1909), Berlin (1911–12). Holland and Belgium (1925), London (1929), and Italy (1934).

== Works ==
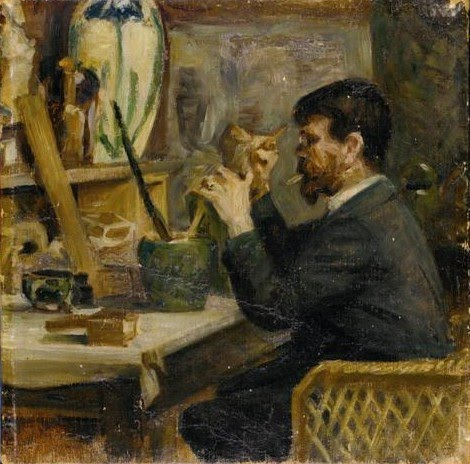
A sketch for a portrait of Karl Schrøder

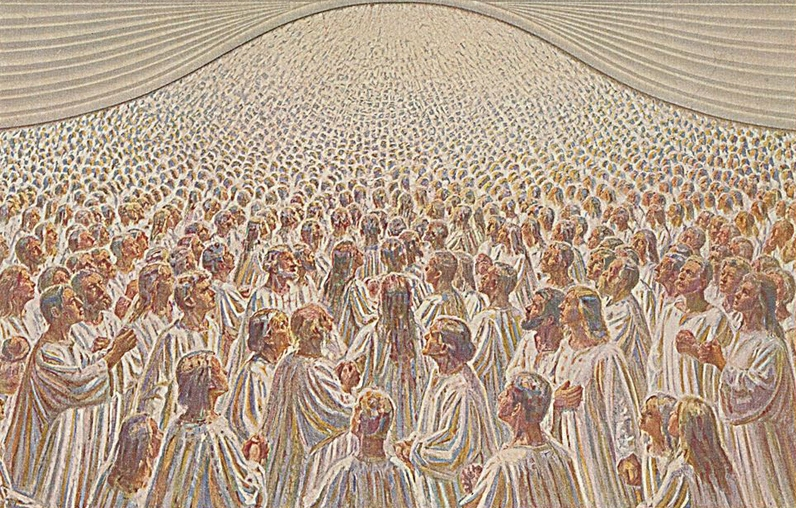
Den store hvide flok, 1908-1915

- Den store hvide flok (1908–15)
- Ribe Amtsråd (1915)
- Christian Xs ridt over grænsen (1921)
- Fra havnen ved Sønderho
- Thorvald Stauning (1929)
