= Jelle de Lange =

Dutch footballer (born 1998)

Personal information
- Date of birth: 30 January 1998 (age 28)
- Place of birth: Amsterdam, Netherlands
- Height: 1.88 m (6 ft 2 in)
- Position: Centre back

Youth career
- 2004–2013: AFC
- 2013–2015: Utrecht

Senior career*
Years	Team	Apps	(Gls)
2015–2017	Utrecht	1	(0)
2015–2017	Jong Utrecht	41	(0)
2017–2018	AFC		

International career
2014–2015	Netherlands U17	10	(0)
- * Club domestic league appearances and goals

Jelle de Lange (born 30 January 1998) is a Dutch former professional footballer who played as a centre back.

== Club career ==
De Lange is a youth exponent from FC Utrecht. He made his Eredivisie debut on 17 May 2015 against Vitesse. In June 2017, de Lange ended his career as a professional footballer, citing a loss of pleasure in playing football. Initially wanting to quit football completely, he later joined his youth club AFC competing in the Hoofdklasse. He played there for a season, and then decided to play with friends in the fifth team of AFC, playing in the Derde Klasse.
