= Cornelia de Lange syndrome =

- Other names: Bushy syndrome
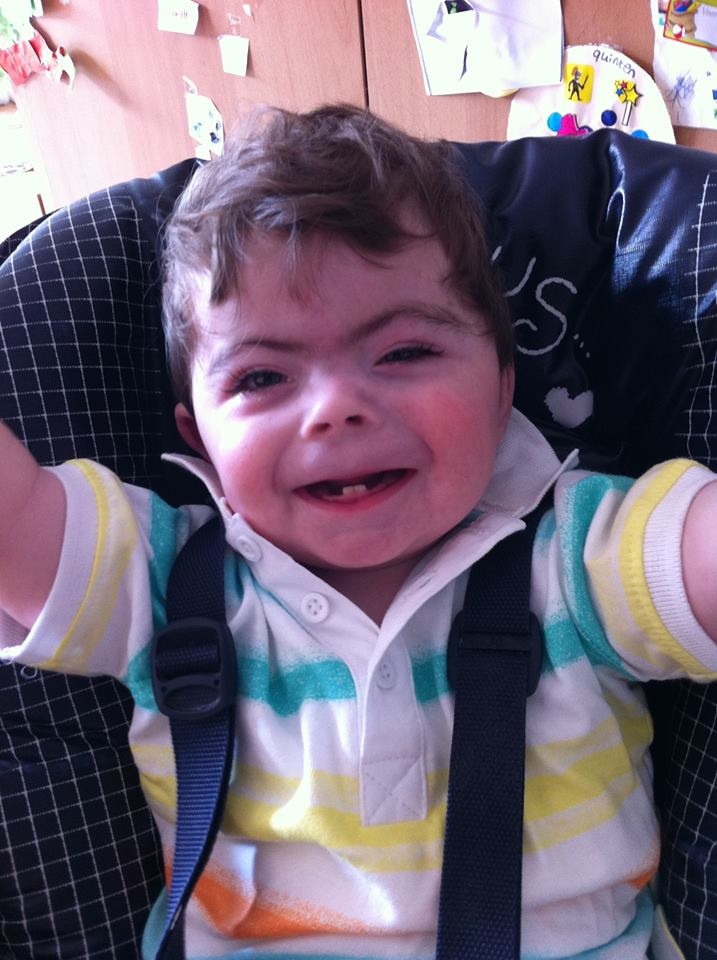
- One-year-old boy displaying characteristic facial features of Cornelia de Lange syndrome
- Specialty: Medical genetics
- Differential diagnosis: Chromatinopathies (KBG syndrome, Wiedemann-Steiner syndrome, MRD23, Rubinstein-Taybi syndrome 2, Coffin-Siris syndrome, CHOPS syndrome
- Frequency: 0.0005%

Cornelia de Lange syndrome (CdLS) is a genetic disorder. People with Cornelia de Lange syndrome experience a range of physical, cognitive, and medical challenges ranging from mild to severe. Cornelia de Lange syndrome has a widely varied phenotype, meaning people with the syndrome have varied features and challenges. The typical features of CdLS include thick or long eyebrows, a small nose, small stature, developmental delay, long or smooth philtrum, thin upper lip and downturned mouth.

The syndrome is named after Dutch pediatrician Cornelia Catharina de Lange, who described it in 1933.

It is often termed Brachmann de Lange syndrome or Bushy syndrome and is also known as Amsterdam dwarfism. Its exact incidence is unknown, but it is estimated at 1 in 10,000 to 30,000.

== Signs and symptoms ==
The phenotype of CdLS is highly varied and is described as a spectrum; from Classic CdLS (with a greater number of key features) to mild variations with only a few features. Some people will have a small number of features but do not have CdLS.

Key features:

- Long and/or thick eyebrows
- Short nose
- Concave nasal ridge and/or upturned nasal tip
- Long and/or smooth philtrum
- Thin upper lip vermilion and/or downturned corners of mouth
- Missing fingers or toes
- Congenital diaphragmatic hernia

Other suggestive features:

- Developmental delay or intellectual disability
- Small prenatal and birth size or weight
- Small stature
- Microcephaly (prenatally or postnatally)
- Small hands or feet
- Short fifth finger
- Hirsutism

The following health conditions are more common in people with CdLS than in the general population.

- Respiratory illness
- Heart defects (e.g., pulmonary stenosis, VSD, ASD, coarctation of the aorta)
- Hearing impairment
- Vision abnormalities (e.g., ptosis, nystagmus, high myopia, hypertropia)
- Partial joining of the second and third toes
- Incurved fifth fingers (clinodactyly)
- Gastroesophageal reflux
- Gastrointestinal abnormalities
- Musculoskeletal problems
- Scoliosis
- Social anxiety
- Seizures
- Cleft palate
- Feeding problems

Children with this syndrome are often found to have long eyelashes, bushy eyebrows and synophrys (joined eyebrows). Body hair can be excessive and affected individuals are often shorter than their immediate family members. They present a characteristic facial phenotype.

Children with CdLS often have gastrointestinal tract difficulties, particularly gastroesophageal reflux. Vomiting, intermittent poor appetite, constipation, diarrhea or gaseous distention are known to be a regularity in cases where the GI tract problems are acute. Symptoms may range from mild to severe.

People with CdLS may exhibit behaviours that have been described as "autistic-like," including self-stimulation, aggression, self-injury, and strong preference to a structured routine. Behavior problems in CdLS are not inevitable. Many behaviour issues associated with CdLS are reactive (i.e., something happens within the person's body or environment to bring on the behavior) and cyclical (comes and goes). Often, an underlying medical issue, pain, social anxiety, environmental or caregiver stress can be associated with a change in behaviour. If pain or a medical issue is the cause, once treated, the behaviour diminishes.

There is evidence for some features of premature aging including the early development of Barrett's esophagus, osteoporosis present in the teenage years, premature greying of hair and some changes to the skin of the face causing a more aged appearance compared to chronological age.

== Causes ==
The vast majority of cases are thought to be due to spontaneous genetic mutations. It can be associated with mutations affecting the cohesin complex.

As of 2018, it was confirmed that 500 genetic mutations have been associated with the condition, occurring on seven different genes. In around 30% of cases of CdLS the genetic cause remains undiscovered. The wide variation in phenotype is attributed to a high degree of somatic mosaicism in CdLS as well as the different genes and type of mutations. For this reason people with CdLS can have very different appearance, abilities, and associated health issues.

Name	OMIM	Gene	Appx. %	Notes
CDLS1	122470	NIPBL	50%	A gene responsible for CdLS on chromosome 5 was discovered in 2004 jointly by researchers at the Children's Hospital of Philadelphia, USA and researchers at Newcastle University, UK.
CDLS2	300590	SMC1A	5%	In 2006, a second gene, on the X chromosome, was found by Italian scientists.
CDLS3	610759	SMC3	1%	A third gene discovery was announced in 2007. The gene is on chromosome 10 and was also discovered by the research team in Philadelphia.

Missense mutations in the latter two genes seem to correlate with a milder form of the syndrome.

In 2004, researchers at the Children's Hospital of Philadelphia (United States) and the University of Newcastle upon Tyne (England) identified a gene (NIPBL) on chromosome 5 that causes CdLS when it is mutated. Since then, additional genes have been found (SMC1A, SMC3 and HDAC8, RAD21) that cause CdLS when changed. In July 2012, the fourth "CdLS gene"—HDAC8—was announced. HDAC8 is an X-linked gene, meaning it is located on the X chromosome. Individuals with CdLS who have the gene change in HDAC8 make up just a small portion of all people with CdLS. Evidence of a linkage at chromosome 3q26.3 is mixed. In 2023, it was shown that around 64% of mutations associated with CdLS are linked to NIPBL gene.

Genetic alterations associated with CdLS have been identified in genes NIPBL, SMC1A and SMC3 as well as the more recently identified genes RAD21 and HDAC8. All of these genetic alterations occurring in CdLS patients affect proteins that function in the cohesin pathway. SMC1A, SMC3 and RAD21 proteins are structural components of the cohesin ring complex. NIPBL is involved in the loading of the cohesin ring onto chromosomes, and HDAC8 deacylates SMC3 to facilitate its function. The cohesin pathway is involved in cohesion of sister chromatids during mitosis, DNA repair, chromosome segregation and the regulation of developmental gene expression. Defects in these functions are theorised to underlie some of the features of CdLS. In particular, defective DNA repair may underlie the features of premature aging.

== Diagnosis ==
The diagnosis of CdLS is primarily based on clinical findings by a clinical geneticist, and in some cases may be confirmed through laboratory testing.

== Treatment ==
Often, an interdisciplinary approach is recommended to treat the issues associated with CdLS. A team for promoting the child's well-being often includes speech, occupational and physical therapists, teachers, physicians, and parents.

Cornelia de Lange syndrome (CdLS) affects many different systems of the body, medical management is often provided by a team of doctors and other healthcare professionals. Treatment for this condition varies based on the signs and symptoms present in each person. It may include:

- Supplemental formulas and/or gastrostomy tube placement to meet nutritional needs and improve the growth delay,
- Ongoing physical, occupational, and speech therapies,
- Surgery to treat skeletal abnormalities, gastrointestinal problems, congenital heart defects and other health problems, and,
- Medications to prevent or control seizures.

Research into CdLS is ongoing.

== History ==
The first documented case was in 1916 by Winfried Robert Clemens Brachmann (1888-1969), a German physician who wrote about the distinctive features of the disease found in his 19-day-old patient. Walther Johann Brachmann was qualified in medicine in 1913 and obtained an appointment as a clinical assistant at the children's hospital in Güttingen. While working at this hospital in 1916, he observed a 19-day-old child who died of pneumonia and wrote a detailed report on the case. His report consisted of several features of the disease that had not been mentioned before in the history of pediatric medicine. The boy died, however, on the nineteenth day from malnutrition. The child had significant malformations; Brachmann identified the most conspicuous anomaly as "Monodactyl due to ulnar defect, with Flight skin formation in the elbows." In addition, the child was very young and showed excessive hair growth. His facial features were also abnormal, especially the widening of the forehead. As Brachmann concluded in his article, the tendency for variations or anomalies in this individual was unmistakable. Since Brachmann was called to military action in the First World War, his research on the specific condition of the boy was stopped.

Later in 1933, Cornelia Catharina de Lange (1871-1951), a Dutch pediatrician, redescribed it; the disorder has been named for her. She enrolled in the University of Zurich to study chemistry but changed her focus to medicine in 1892. She crossed the prejudices of her time, studying to become a physician. She graduated from the University of Amsterdam in 1897, becoming the fifth woman physician to qualify in the Netherlands. However, because pediatrics did not exist as a specialty in the Netherlands, De Lange moved to Switzerland, where she worked in the children's hospital in Zurich under Oskar Wyss.

Cornelia de Lange's patients were two girls with unusual facies and intellectual disability—one 17 months and the other 6 months—who were admitted within weeks of each other to Emma Children's Hospital. The first child had pneumonia. Her first year of life had been characterized by a lot of feeding difficulties and she was very small for her age, with a proportionately smaller head circumference. The second child had the same medical problem, and their resemblance to each other was remarkable. De Lange termed the condition "un type nouveau de dégénération" (typus Amstelodamensis). This account attracted little attention but in 1941, after she had presented a further case to the Amsterdam Neurological Society, the disorder gained recognition.

Initially, Winfried Brachmann had described a similar patient in 1916. His report was based on the clinical and autopsy features of an infant who died of pneumonia at the age of 19 days. Cornelia de Lange probably overlooked his report because he concentrated on characteristics of the upper limbs and wrote on the facial symptoms less specifically.

De Lange conducted microscopic research on blood and urine and took X-rays too. She described an anomaly of the skull, to which she referred as brachycephaly. She described the somatic and behavioral phenotype to define a "mental development disease". At the time she based this diagnosis simply on behavioral observations without verification through psychological evaluation, which could have indicated the degree of intellectual disability.

Subsequently, de Lange described the malformations of the limbs, "Small, chubby hands and feet, short fingers of both hands and feet, little finger curved towards the ring finger. Thumb and ball of the thumb in a position more proximal than usual, thus gave the hand a certain resemblance to the foot of the orang and the chimpanzee.". Two months after the first girl's description, another girl was hospitalized with pneumonia. The similarity between the first and this second girl was so striking that the nurses thought the first girl had returned: "These children were so alike that the nurses who had cared for the first sick girl exclaimed: "Here is W.E. back! But, thinking for a moment, they added. "No, it is not possible, this child is younger than W.E." After carefully observing the girl, De Lange concluded that the second girl showed the same characteristics as the first one. Since the two children weren't related, she supposed she was dealing with two isolated cases. De Lange believed the condition was caused by genetic abnormalities. In order to promote knowledge of the phenomenon she stressed that new cases had to be found for further examination of the syndrome.

In 1938, De Lange published a second paper reporting a clinical series of five cases: a third girl with the same features and two cases published by Vedder. In addition to performing neurological and radiographic examination, De Lange also collected the data from the autopsy performed on one of the first two girls she observed and reported the results of the macroscopic and microscopic examination of the cerebral hemispheres. This child died at five years and nine months in an asylum. No abnormalities were found in the organs of the chest and endocrine system. The peritoneum, however, had shown anomalies that are common among mammals, but not among humans. In addition, microscopic tests of the right hemisphere had revealed a reduced number of brain wraps.

Again, De Lange was aware that further studies were needed to unravel the underlying pathological anatomy of the identified condition. However, with both her articles, in 1933 and 1938, De Lange described a rare new condition called "typus Amstelodamensis". In her discovery, her meticulous observations of the specific phenotypic abnormalities had been crucial. Furthermore, her research in the anatomo-pathological abnormalities was supportive in unveiling the first knowledge of the endo-phenotype of these clinical cases. In a review in 1985, John Marius Opitz commented: "Brachmann's paper is a classic of Western Medical iconography, deserving to be commemorated in the eponym "Brachmann-de Lange syndrome." This conjoined eponym is now generally accepted, although the term "de Lange" or Cornelia de Lange's syndrome is also common. This condition is described sometimes as one syndrome, sometimes as two.

== See also ==
- List of syndromes
- Characteristics of syndromic ASD conditions
