= Ina Lange =

Finnish pianist and writer (1846–1930)

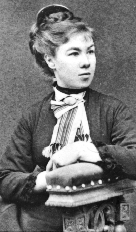
- Ina Lange c. 1880
- Born: Ina Blenda August Forstén; 14 December 1846; Helsinki, Grand Duchy of Finland
- Died: 23 October 1930 (aged 83); Copenhagen, Denmark
- Occupations: Writer; Music historian; Pianist
- Spouse: Algot Lange (m. 1876 — div. 1898)
- Children: 3, incl. Algot Lange
- Writing career
- Pen name: Daniel Ste(r)n
- Genres: Realism, non-fiction
- Subjects: Feminism; History of music

Ina Lange (née Forstén; 14 December 1846 – 23 October 1930), also known by her pen names Daniel Sten and Daniel Stern, was a Finnish writer, music historian, pianist and music instructor.

== Early life and education ==
Ina Forstén was born into an upper-class family in Helsinki. Her father, Johan August Forstén, was a high-ranking civil servant, and her mother Augusta Wilhelmina (née Danielson) was cousin to the senator and professor, Valtioneuvos Johan Richard Danielson-Kalmari. She was second cousin on father’s side to professor G. V. Forsten.

She was privately educated, first at home by a governess, followed by studies at the Höhere Töchterschule (lit. 'Higher Daughter School') in Berlin.

She subsequently went on to study music, first in Berlin, and later at the Moscow Conservatory under the likes of Nikolai Rubinstein and Pyotr Ilyich Tchaikovsky.

== Private life ==
While living in Stockholm in the 1870s, Forstén is known to have been friends with the Finnish noblewoman and actress Siri von Essen and her Swedish writer husband August Strindberg, in many of whose works she appeared.

In 1876, she married the opera singer Algot Lange. The couple had three sons, the youngest of whom, Åke Mortimer (b. 1884), later took his father's name and became known as the explorer and writer Algot Lange.

The Langes lived at first in Helsinki, then Stockholm, before moving in the mid-1880s to Copenhagen. There she became acquainted with Maria Feodorovna (then Princess Dagmar of Denmark) and Crown Prince Frederik. She is known later to have used her friendship with the former to pass on messages between Finnish politicians Danielson-Kalmari and Yrjö Sakari Yrjö-Koskinen and the Russian Imperial Court, to advocate for constitutional reforms in Finland.

The Langes' marriage ended in divorce in 1898. She continued living in Copenhagen until 1913, when she moved to Malmö in Sweden.

== Career ==
For virtually her entire career, Lange lived and worked outside of Finland, and consequently she is relatively little-known in Finland, unlike in Sweden and Denmark, where she is considered a notable musician, music pedagogue and writer.

=== Musician ===
In Copenhagen, Lange was engaged as a court pianist and tutor for the Danish royal family.

She was considered a piano virtuoso, performing among other places at the British and Scandinavian courts, as well as touring extensively around Europe with her husband.

Despite her privileged circumstances, she had a keen social conscience and empathised with the less fortunate, and was eager to perform, as well as to lecture on music, to a general audience at public venues.

=== Writer ===
Lange's writing debut came in 1884. As was common at the time for women writers, she disguised her identity behind various noms de plume including Daniel Sten, Daniel Stern, and others, when writing fiction; her music history and other non-fiction works were from the outset published under her real name.

Most of her fiction writing took place in the 1880s, with her notable works including Bland ödebygder och skär (1884), ”Sämre folk” (1885), En skaebne (1887), Med kärlek! (1888) and Luba (1889). She is considered a literary realist, with her major themes including women's rights and their subjugated position in society, as well as class conflicts.

In the latter part of her writing career, which continued until the year of her death, she focused on non-fiction writing, mostly music and history, and especially the personal histories of the great composers.

She also published several books on music education.
