= Raymond Delange =

French general

- Born: 21 January 1898; Jouars-Pontchartrain, Yvelines, France
- Died: 14 May 1976 (aged 78) Paris, France
- Allegiance: France; Free France
- Branch: Army
- Service years: 1917–1958
- Rank: General
- Awards: Legion of Honour; Order of the Liberation; Croix de Guerre; Cross for Military Valour; Colonial Medal; Resistance Medal; Distinguished Service Cross

Raymond Delange (21 January 1898 – 14 May 1976) was a French Army general. He was a veteran of World War I, World War II and the Algerian War. He was made a Companion of the Liberation for his World War II service.

== Early life ==
Raymond Delange was born on 21 January 1898. His father was an investor while his mother was a midwife.

== Career ==
Delange joined the French Army during World War I in April 1917. He joined the Troupes coloniales and served in Tonkin, French Indochina, Tunisia and Morocco. From 1935 to 1940, he served in Sudan, Mauritania, Senegal and Chad. In 1940, during World War II, he joined the Free French Forces in the French Equatorial Africa. In 1943, he served as "the governor and military leader" of the Fezzan, the southwestern part of Libya. He later fought in France. He subsequently served in Tunisia and French Indochina. He was a general in French Algeria from 1955 to 1958, during the Algerian War. He retired in 1958.

Delande received the Grand Croix of the Legion of Honour, the Cross for Military Valour, the Croix de Guerre, the Resistance Medal and the Colonial Medal. Additionally, he was made a Companion of the Liberation for his World War II service. He also received the Distinguished Service Cross from the United States Army.

== Death ==
Delange died on 14 May 1976. He was buried at the Montparnasse Cemetery.
