= Ludwig Lange (philologist) =

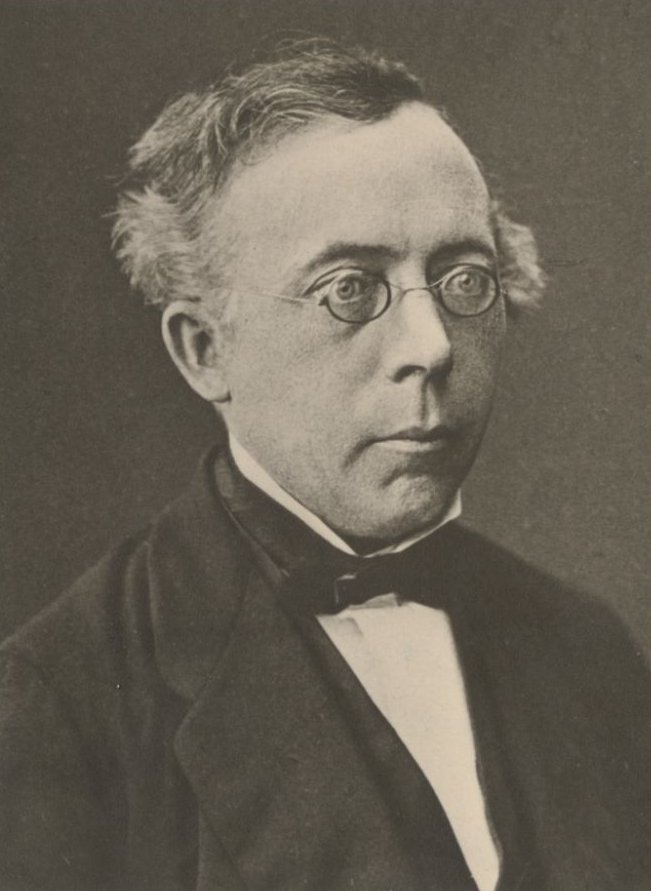
- Born: Christian Conrad Ludwig Lange; 4 March 1825; Hanover, Kingdom of Hanover, German Confederation
- Died: 18 August 1885 (aged 60); Leipzig, Kingdom of Saxony, German Empire

Academic background
- Education: University of Göttingen

Academic work
- Discipline: Classical philology, archaeology
- Notable works: Handbuch der römischen Altertümer

Christian Conrad Ludwig Lange (born 4 March 1825 in Hanover; died 18 August 1885 in Leipzig) was a German philologist and archaeologist.

== Biography ==
He studied at the University of Göttingen under Karl Friedrich Hermann, and in 1855 became a full professor of classical philology at the University of Prague. In 1859, he relocated as a professor to the University of Giessen, and in 1871 moved to Leipzig, where in 1879/80 he served as university rector.

His principal work was "Handbuch der römischen Altertümer" (3rd edition, 1876–79); and he also wrote "Der homerische Gebrauch der Partikel εἰ" (1872–73) and "Die Epheten und der Areopag vor Solon" (1874). His smaller writings were posthumously collected and edited, with a biographical sketch by K. Lange, under the title "Kleine Schriften aus dem Gebiete der classischen Alterthumswissenschaft" (1887).

== Family ==
He married Adelheid Blume in 1854. They had four children: Konrad (1855–1921), an art historian; Ludwig, a physicist; Sophie; and Gertrud.

== Sources ==
- This work in turn cites:
  - Neumann, Ludwig Lange (Berlin, 1886)
- Lange, Ludwig at Neue Deutsche Biographie
