= Ludwig Lange (architect) =

German architect (1808–1868)

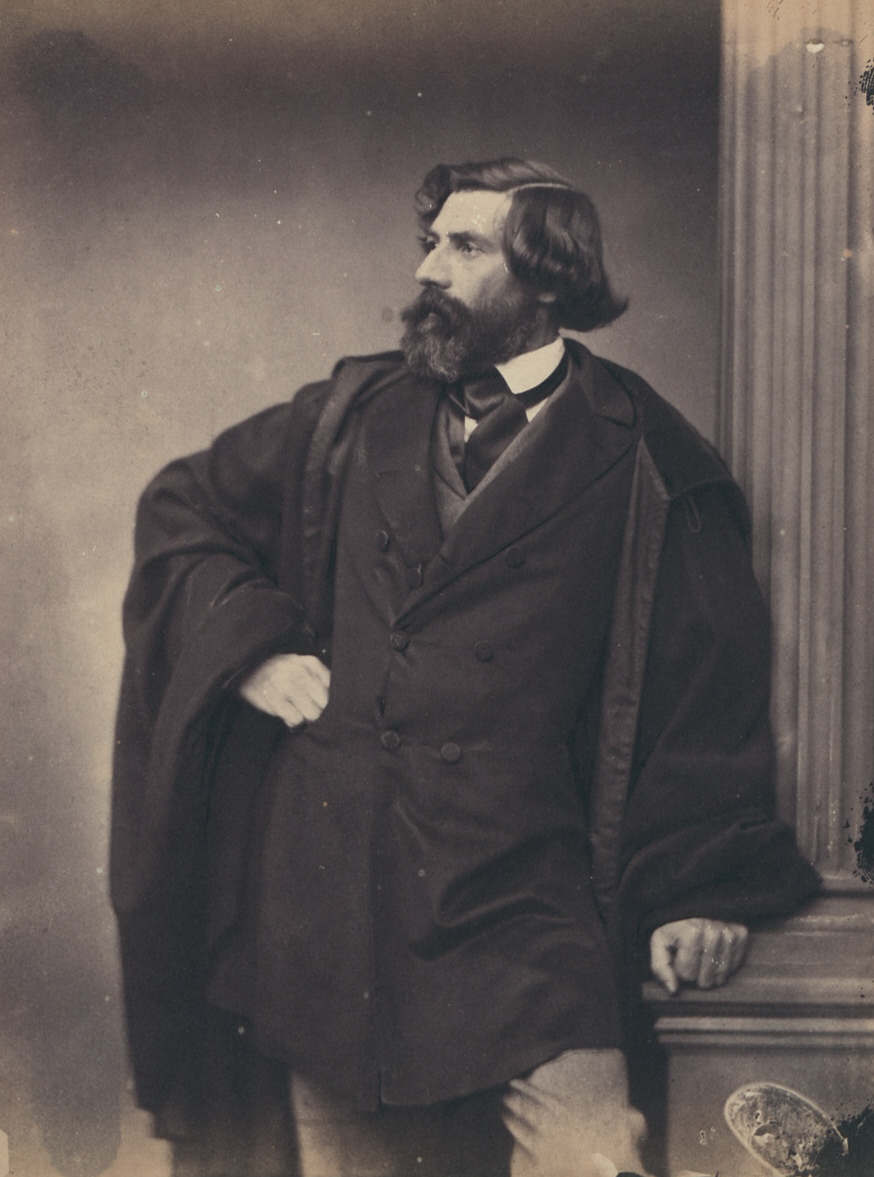
- Photograph of Ludwig Lange by Franz Hanfstaengl (late 1850s)
- Born: 22 March 1808; Darmstadt
- Died: 31 March 1868 (aged 60); Munich
- Occupations: Architect and landscape designer

Ludwig Lange (22 March 1808– 31 March 1868) was a German architect and landscape designer.

== Life ==
He was the son of a court official and began his training as an architect in 1823 under church designer Georg August Lerch. From 1826 to 1830, he attended the University of Gießen, where he studied with Georg Moller. His studies continued in Munich, where he was a pupil of the landscape painter Carl Rottmann, with whom he undertook a study trip to Greece in 1834.

In 1835, he was appointed to be a drawing teacher at the New Royal High School in Athens and, on 15 May, became a building inspector for King Otto I. He returned to Germany in 1838 and travelled extensively there. In 1847, he was appointed to succeed August von Voit as Professor of Architecture at the Academy of Fine Arts Munich.

He is best known for a large series of lithographs (produced in conjunction with his brothers Georg, Gustav and Julius) depicting examples of Gothic architecture in the Rhine Valley; and (with Ernst Rauch) steel-engraved views of prominent German cities. From 1846 to 1855, he published his designs as Works of Higher Architecture; encompassing three volumes. The Royal Villa in Berchtesgaden and the Museum der bildenden Künste in Leipzig (1856–1857) were built from his designs. He also submitted a draft for a new parliamentary building for the Netherlands, but his draft was rejected. His style was a mixture of Classical and Italian Renaissance elements.

== Selected designs ==
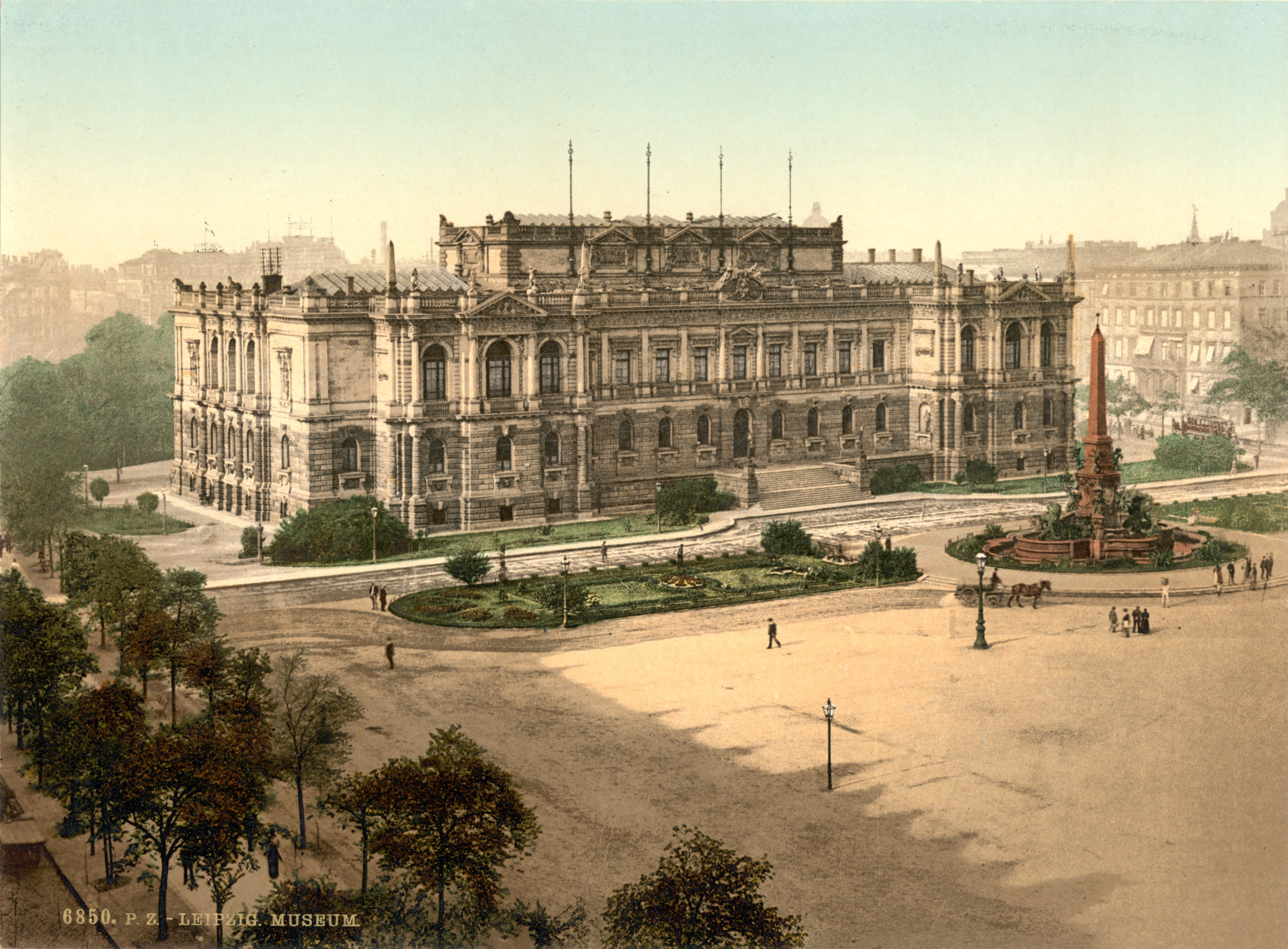
Museum der bildenden Künste in Leipzig (c.1890)

- 1850–1853: Royal Villa in Berchtesgaden, summer home for King Maximilian II of Bavaria
- 1852: Orthodox Church in Moscow
- 1854: Bourse in Bergen, Norway
- 1856: Museum der bildenden Künste in Leipzig (destroyed in 1943)
- 1857: Protestant Kirche in Hallstadt
- 1860: National Archaeological Museum, Athens (Built: 1866–1891. The façade was designed by Ernst Ziller)
- 1860: Villa Feodora for Georg II, Duke of Saxe-Meiningen in Bad Liebenstein

== Books ==
- Originalansichten der historisch merkwürdigsten Städte in Deutschland, ihrer Dome, Kirchen und sonstigen Baudenkmale (Original Views of the most remarkable historic cities in Germany, their Cathedrals, Churches and other monuments), 6 Vols., Darmstadt 1832–1867.
- Reiseberichte aus Griechenland (Travelogues from Greece), Darmstadt 1835.
- Malerische Ansichten der merkwürdigsten und schönsten Kathedralen, Kirchen und Monumente der gothischen Baukunst am Rhein, Main und der Lahn (Picturesque views of the strangest and most beautiful cathedrals, churches and monuments of Gothic architecture on the Rhine, Main and Lahn), Frankfurt 1843.
- Werke der höheren Baukunst (Works of Higher Architecture), 3 Vols., Darmstadt 1846–1855.
- Die griechischen Landschaftsgemälde von Karl Rottmann in der neuen königlichen Pinakothek zu München (Greek landscape painting by Karl Rottmann in the new Royal Pinakothek at Munich), Munich 1854.
- Das Königreich Sachsen, Thüringen und Anhalt in malerischen Original-Ansichten (The Kingdom of Saxony, Thuringia and Anhalt in picturesque original views), 2 Vols., Darmstadt 1857.
