= Ludwig Lange (physicist) =

German physicist

Ludwig Lange (born 21 June 1863 in Gießen; died 12 July 1936 in Weinsberg) was a German physicist.

== Biography ==
He was the son of the philologist and archaeologist Ludwig Lange and his wife Adelheide Blume. He studied mathematics, physics, and also psychology, epistemology, ethics at the University of Leipzig and the University of Gießen from 1882-1885. He was an assistant of Wilhelm Wundt from 1885-1887 and attained his Ph.D. in 1886. He worked for many years as a Privatdozent, and in the field of photography. From 1887, he exhibited growing symptoms of a nervous disease. In 1936 he died in a psychiatric hospital (Klinikum am Weissenhof) in Weinsberg.

== Legacy ==
Lange is known for inventing terms like inertial frame of reference and inertial time (1885), which were used by him instead of Newton's "absolute space and time". This was very important for the development of relativistic mechanics after 1900. DiSalle describes Lange's definition in this way:

An inertial system is a coordinate system with respect to which three free particles, projected from a single point and moving in non-coplanar directions, move in straight lines and travel mutually-proportional distances. The law of inertia then states that relative to any inertial system, any fourth free particle will move uniformly.

== Works ==
- Lange, L. (1885). "Über die wissenschaftliche Fassung des Galileischen Beharrungsgesetzes". Philosophische Studien. 2: 266–297.
- Lange, L. (1885). "Über das Beharrungsgesetz. Berichte über Verhandlungen der Königlich Sächsischen Gesellschaft der Wissenschaften". Mathematisch-physikalische Klasse. Leipzig: 333–351.
- Lange, L. (1886). Die geschichtliche Entwicklung des Bewegungsbegriffs und ihr voraussichtliches Endergebnis. Leipzig: W. Engelmann.
- Lange, L. (1902). "Das Inertialsystem vor dem Forum der Naturforschung". Philosophische Studien. 20: 1–71.

== Sources ==
- von Laue, Max (1948). "Dr. Ludwig Lange (1863-1936). Ein zu Unrecht Vergessener". Die Naturwissenschaften. 35 (7): 193–196. Bibcode:1948NW.....35..224.. doi:10.1007/BF00597616.
- Max von Laue (1982). "Lange, Ludwig". Neue Deutsche Biographie (in German). Vol. 13. Berlin: Duncker & Humblot. pp. 551–552.
- Pfister, Herbert; King, Markus (2015). Inertia and Gravitation. The Fundamental Nature and Structure of Space-Time. Vol. The Lecture Notes in Physics. Volume 897. Heidelberg: Springer. doi:10.1007/978-3-319-15036-9. ISBN 978-3-319-15035-2.
- Robert DiSalle (Summer 2002). "Space and Time: Inertial Frames". In Edward N. Zalta (ed.). The Stanford Encyclopedia of Philosophy. Metaphysics Research Lab, Stanford University.
