= Laing (surname) =

Laing (/læŋ, leɪŋ/) is a Scottish surname, a variant of Lang.

Notable people with the surname include:

- Alex Laing (footballer), New Zealand footballer
- Alexander Gordon Laing (1794–1826), Scottish explorer
- Alexander Laing (architect), Scottish architect
- Andrew Laing (born 1966), New Zealand actor
- Annie Rose Laing (1869–1946), Scottish artist
- Arthur Laing (rugby union) (1892–1927), Scotland international rugby union player
- Arthur Laing (1904–1975), Canadian politician
- Bert Laing, New Zealand rugby player
- Billy Laing (born 1951), Scottish footballer
- Bobby Laing (1925–1985), Scottish footballer
- Bonnie Laing (1937–2016), Canadian politician
- Brent Laing (born 1978), Canadian curler
- C. J. Laing (born 1956), American pornographic actress
- Cassandra Laing (1968–2007), Australian artist
- Catriona Laing, British diplomat
- Corky Laing (born 1948), Canadian musician
- Dave Laing (1947–2019), English music journalist
- David Laing (antiquary) (1793–1878), Scottish antiquary
- David Laing (architect) (1774–1856), British architect
- Davie Laing (1925–2017), Scottish footballer
- Dilys Laing (1906–1960), Welsh-American poet
- Duncan Laing (1933–2008), New Zealand swimming coach
- Ebenezer Laing (1931–2015), Ghanaian botanist and geneticist
- Eleanor Laing (born 1958), British politician
- Gerald Laing (1936–2011), Scottish artist
- Gordon Jennings Laing (1869–1945), Canadian-American academic
- Gordon Laing (musician) (born 1964), British classical bassoonist
- Hannah Laing, Scottish disc jockey and record producer
- Hector Laing, Baron Laing of Dunphail (1923–2010), British businessman
- Hugh Laing (1911–1988), British ballet dancer
- Ivan Laing (1885–1917), Scottish hockey player
- James Laing (doctor) (c. 1749–1831), Scottish doctor and plantation owner in Dominica
- James Laing (footballer), Scottish footballer
- James Laing (shipbuilder), British shipbuilder
- Jamie Laing (born 1988), English television personality
- Jim Laing, Canadian sportscaster and radio station owner
- John Laing (disambiguation), several people
- Kerri Laing (born 1968), South African cricketer
- Kirby Laing (1916–2009), English businessman
- Kirkland Laing (1954–2021), Jamaican-English boxer
- Kojo Laing (1946–2017), Ghanaian novelist and poet
- Lavinia Malcolm née Laing (c. 1847–1920), Scottish suffragist, politician, first Scottish woman female councillor and first female Lord Provost
- Leslie Laing (1925–2021), Jamaican athlete
- Malcolm Laing (1762–1818), Scottish historian
- Marie Laing (1937–2023), Canadian politician
- Martin Laing (1942–2023), English businessman
- Martin Laing (production designer), British film production designer
- Maureen Laing (1920–2013), American journalist and author
- Maurice Laing (1918–2008), English businessman
- Quintin Laing (born 1979), Canadian ice hockey player
- R. D. Laing (1927–1989), Scottish psychiatrist
- Robbie Laing (born 1958), American basketball coach
- Robert W. Laing, British film art director
- Roy Laing (1893–1972), Australian footballer
- Samuel Laing (science writer) (1812–1897), British railway administrator, politician, and writer on science and religion
- Samuel Laing (travel writer) (1780–1868), author of books on Scandinavia and Germany
- Sandra Laing (born 1955), South African apartheid cause célèbre
- Shona Laing (born 1955), New Zealand musician
- Stuart Laing (actor) (born 1969), British actor
- Stuart Laing (diplomat) (born 1948), British diplomat
- Tony Laing (boxer) (born 1957), Jamaican-British boxer
- William Laing (disambiguation), several people

== See also ==
- Laing (disambiguation)
- Lang (surname)
- Lange (surname)
- Layng (surname)
