= Lang (surname) =

Lang is a surname of Germanic origin, closely related to Lange, Laing and Long, all of which mean "tall".

== Surname ==
=== Australian ===
- Gary Lang, choreographer and dancer, director of NT Dance Company
- Jack Lang (1876–1975), politician
- Jeff Lang (born 1969), songwriter, singer and slide guitarist
- John Lang (1816–1864), said to be the first Australian-born novelist
- John Lang (born 1950), Australian rugby player and coach
- John Dunmore Lang (1799–1878), publicist and politician
- Martin Lang (rugby league), Australian rugby player

=== European ===
- Ádám Lang (born 1993), Hungarian footballer
- Adolf Lang (1848–1913), Hungarian-German architect
- Alexander Lang (1941–2024), German actor and stage director
- Andrew Lang (1844–1912), Scottish philologist and translator of folk and fairy tales
- Anton Lang (1875–1938), German potter and actor
- Archibald Lang (fl. 1880), Scottish football player
- Arnold Lang (1855–1914), Swiss naturalist
- Belinda Lang (born 1955), English actress
- Bernhard Lang (born 1957), Austrian composer
- Cosmo Lang (1864–1945), Archbishop of Canterbury
- Craig Sellar Lang (1891–1971), British-domiciled organist, music teacher, and composer
- Czesław Lang (born 1955), Polish road racing cyclist and Tour de Pologne director
- David Marshall Lang (1924–1991), British historian
- Don Lang (musician) (1925–1992), English singer
- Eva Lang (born 1947), German economist
- Franzl Lang (1930–2015), German yodeler and singer
- Friedrich Lang (1894–1937), Austro-Hungarian naval aviator
- Fritz Lang (1890–1976), Austrian film director
- Gerald Lang, British philosopher
- Gerhard Lang (1924–2016), German botanist
- Harold Lang (British actor) (1923–1970), British actor
- Hedi Lang (1931–2004), Swiss politician
- Hermann Lang (1909–1987), German race car driver
- Ian Lang (born 1940), Scottish politician
- István Láng, (1933–2023), Hungarian composer
- István Lang (born 1933), Hungarian cyclist
- Ivana Lang (1912–1982), Croatian composer, pianist and piano teacher
- Jack Lang (born 1939), French politician
- Josephine Lang (1815–1880), German composer
- Júlia Láng (born 2003), Hungarian figure skater
- Julia Lang (actress) (1921–2010), British actress and radio presenter
- Karel Lang, Czech ice hockey player
- Karl Georg Herman Lang (1901–1976), Swedish naturalist
- Karl Nikolaus Lang (1670–1741), Swiss physician and naturalist
- Kirsty Lang (born 1962), British broadcaster and journalist
- Klaus Lang (born 1971), Austrian composer
- Leonora Blanche Lang (1851–1933), English author, editor, and translator
- Maria Lang, pen name of Swedish crime novel writer Dagmar Lange (1914–1991)
- Mirko Lang (born 1978), German actor
- Noa Lang, Dutch soccer player
- Peter Lang, Swiss publisher; see Peter Lang (publishing company)
- Peter Redford Scott Lang (1850–1926) Scottish mathematician
- Rein Lang (born 1957), Estonian politician
- Ricarda Lang (born 1994), German politician
- Rikard Lang (1913–1994), Croatian lawyer and economist
- Robert Lang (actor) (1934–2004), English actor
- Robert Lang (ice hockey) (born 1970), ice hockey player
- Sebastian Lang (born 1979), German road cyclist
- Serge Lang (1927–2005), mathematician and activist
- Serge Lang (skiing) (1920–1999), French journalist who founded the alpine skiing World Cup
- Slobodan Lang (1945–2016), Croatian physician and politician
- Steven Lang (footballer) (born 1987), Swiss football player
- Thomas Lang (born 1969), musician and drummer
- Thomas Lang (singer), English singer and songwriter
- Thomas Kaan Önol Lang (born 2007), Turkish alpine ski racer
- Valérie Lang (1966–2013), French actress
- Valter Lang (born 1958), Estonian archaeologist
- Werner Lang (1922–2013), German engineer
- Zsolt Láng (born 1973), Hungarian politician

=== North American ===
- Amanda Lang (born 1970), Canadian journalist
- Andrew Lang (born 1966), American basketball player
- Annie Traquair Lang (1885–1918), American impressionist painter
- Anton Lang (1913–1996), American natural scientist
- Archie Lang, Canadian politician
- Ben Lang (1870–1960), American politician
- Benjamin Johnson Lang (1837–1909), American conductor and pianist
- Berel Lang, American historian and author
- Christa Lang (1943–2026), German-American actress and screenwriter
- Cody Lang (born 1993), American soccer player
- D. L. Lang (born 1983), American poet
- David Lang (1838–1917), Confederate States Army officer during the American Civil War
- David Lang (born 1957), American composer, Pulitzer Prize winner
- David Lang (1967–2005), American football player
- Eddie Lang (1902–1933), American jazz guitarist
- Eric M. Lang, Canadian game designer
- Eugene Lang (1919–2017), American businessman and philanthropist
- Glen Lang, American businessman and politician
- Harold Lang (dancer) (1920–1985), American ballet dancer
- Harry E. Lang (1894–1953), American actor
- John Lang (1839–1921), Canadian politician and farmer in Ontario
- John Lang (1794–?), United States Navy sailor
- John H. Lang (1899–1970), United States Navy officer
- Jonny Lang (born 1981), American blues guitarist
- Kara Lang (born 1986), Canadian soccer player
- Karen Lang, American mayor
- Katherine Kelly Lang (born 1961), American actress
- k.d. lang (born 1961), Canadian singer-songwriter
- Kris Lang (born 1979), American basketball player
- Lex Lang (born 1965), American voice actor
- Lorraine Lang (born 1956), Canadian curler
- Lucy Robins Lang (1884–1962), American labor activist
- Margaret Ruthven Lang (1867–1972), American composer
- Margie Lang (1924–2007), American baseball player
- Martin Lang (born 1949), American fencer
- Michael Lang (musician) (1941–2022), American pianist and composer
- Michelle Lang (1975–2009), Canadian journalist
- Otto Lang (born 1932), Canadian politician
- Pearl Lang (1921–2009), American dancer and choreographer
- Perry Lang (born 1959), American director, writer, and actor
- Phil Lang (1929–2024), American politician from Oregon=
- Rick Lang (born 1953), Canadian curler
- Robert J. Lang (born 1961), American origami artist and theorist
- Sonja Lang (born 1978), Canadian linguist and inventor of Toki Pona
- Stephen Lang (born 1952), American film and theater actor
- Steve Lang (1949–2017), Canadian rock bassist
- Violet Ranney Lang (1924–1956), American poet and playwright
- Will Lang Jr. (1914–1968), American journalist
- W. Patrick Lang (1940–2023), United States Army officer

== Given name ==
- Lang Hancock (1909–1992), Australian iron ore magnate
- Dao Lang, Chinese musician
- Shi Lang (1621–1696), Chinese admiral

== Fictional characters ==
- Adam Lang, a character in Robert Harris's novel The Ghost and its film adaptation.
- Cassandra Lang, Marvel Comics superheroine daughter of Scott Lang; member of the Young Avengers
- Charlie Lang, character in the film It Could Happen to You (1994 film)
- Clubber Lang, antagonist in the movie Rocky III
- Lana Lang, a DC Comics character
- San Lang (aka Hua Cheng), main character from the Chinese novel Heaven Official's Blessing
- Scott Lang, Marvel Comics superhero known as Ant-Man who was a member of the Avengers
- Shi-Long Lang, a character from Ace Attorney Investigations: Miles Edgeworth
- Sophie Lang, character in the films The Notorious Sophie Lang (1934), The Return of Sophie Lang (1936), and Sophie Lang Goes West (1937)
- Steven Lang (character), Marvel Comics supervillain
- Penelope and Charles "Chaz" Lang, characters on TV show Atomic Betty

== See also ==
- Lange (surname)
- Langer
- Long (Western surname) (English form)
- Laing (surname)
- Liang, surname
