= Johann Lange =

Johann Lange may refer to:

- Johann Joachim Lange (1670–1744), German theologian
- Johann Peter Lange (1802–1884), German theologian
- Johann de Lange (born 1959), South African writer

== See also ==
- Johan Lange (1818–1898), Danish botanist
- Johann Lang, or John Lange, friend of Martin Luther
- John Lange (disambiguation)
