= Alexander Laing =

Alexander or Alex Laing may refer to:

- Alexander Laing (antiquary) (1778–1838), Scottish antiquarian.
- Alexander Laing (Scottish poet) (1787–1857), Scottish verse writer
- Alexander Gordon Laing (1794–1826), Scottish explorer
- Alexander Laing (architect) (1752–1823), Scottish architect
- Alexander Laing (American writer) (1903–1976), American poet and writer of sea stories
- Alex Laing (footballer), New Zealand football goalkeeper
- Alex Laing (rugby union) (1865–?), Scottish rugby union player
