= John Lang =

John Lang may refer to:

== Sports ==
- John Lang (footballer, born 1881) (1881–1934), Scottish footballer
- John Lang (footballer, born 1908), Scottish footballer
- John Lang (Australian rugby league) (born 1950), Australian rugby league player and coach
- John Lang (New Zealand rugby league) (1896–1971), New Zealand rugby league player

== Musicians ==
- John Lang (American musician) (born 1952), lyric writer for Mr. Mister and member of the band Djinn
- John Lang (Rough Trade), Canadian musician with the band Rough Trade
- Jonny Lang (born 1981), American blues and gospel musician

== Clergy ==
- John Dunmore Lang (1799–1878), Presbyterian clergyman and early advocate of Australian republicanism
- John Marshall Lang CVO (1834–1909), Church of Scotland minister and author
- John Lang (priest) (1927–2012), Anglican Dean of Lichfield

== Writers ==
- John Marshall Lang CVO (1834–1909), Church of Scotland minister and author
- John Lang (writer) (1816–1864), said to be the first Australian-born novelist
- John Lang (1972-Now), French writer, author of The Dungeon of Naheulbeuk
- John Lang (American musician) (born 1952), lyric writer for Mr. Mister and member of the band Djinn

== Military ==
- John Lang (sailor) (1794–?), sailor in the United States Navy
- John H. Lang (1899–1970), American who served with the Canadian Army and the United States Navy
- Sir John Lang (1896–1984), British civil servant and Royal Artilleryman

== Others ==
- John Lang (Canadian politician) (1839–1921), former member of the Canadian House of Commons
- Johnny Lang, historic Joshua Tree National Park cattle rancher and gold miner

== See also ==
- Jack Lang (disambiguation)
- John Lange (disambiguation)
- John Laing (disambiguation)
