= James Laing =

James Laing may refer to:

- James Laing (doctor) (c. 1749–1831), Scottish medical man and plantation owner in Dominica
- James Laing (footballer) (1897–1917), Scottish footballer
- Jim Laing, Canadian sportscaster and radio station owner
- James Laing (archer), participated in Archery at the 2010 Commonwealth Games – Men's recurve individual
- James Laing (shipbuilder) (1823–1901), British shipbuilder

== See also ==
- James Lang (disambiguation)
- Jamie Laing (born 1988), English presenter
