= James Lang =

James Lang may refer to:

== Sportsmen ==
- James Lang (basketball) (born 1983), American basketball player
- Jimmy Lang (1851–?), Scottish footballer
- James Lang (cricketer) (1900–1973), English cricketer
- Jim Lang (rugby union) (1909–1991), Welsh international rugby union player
- James Lang (rugby union) (born 1995), Scottish international rugby union player

== Others ==
- Chris Lang (politician) (James Christian Lang, 1910–2002), Australian politician
- Clubber Lang, James "Clubber" Lang, fictional boxer in Rocky III portrayed by Mr. T
- Jim Lang (composer), American composer
- Jim Lang (broadcaster) (born 1965), Canadian broadcaster and sportscaster

== See also ==
- Jim Laing, Canadian play-by-play sportscaster for the Boston Bruins
- Jim Lange (1932–2014), disc jockey, TV game show host & TV personality
- Jimmy Lange (born 1975), boxer
- James Laing (disambiguation)
