= William Laing =

William Laing may refer to:

- William Laing (bookseller) (1764–1832), Scottish bookseller
- William Laing (Medal of Honor) (c. 1831 – 1864), soldier in the Union Army and a Medal of Honor recipient
- William Laing (athlete) (1929–1997), Ghanaian athlete
- William Laing (artist) (born 1944), Scottish/Canadian artist
- William Kirby Laing, British civil engineer
- William Roy Laing, Australian rules footballer

== See also ==
- Bill Laing, Canadian ice hockey player
- Billy Laing, Scottish footballer
