= USS Lang (FF-1060) =

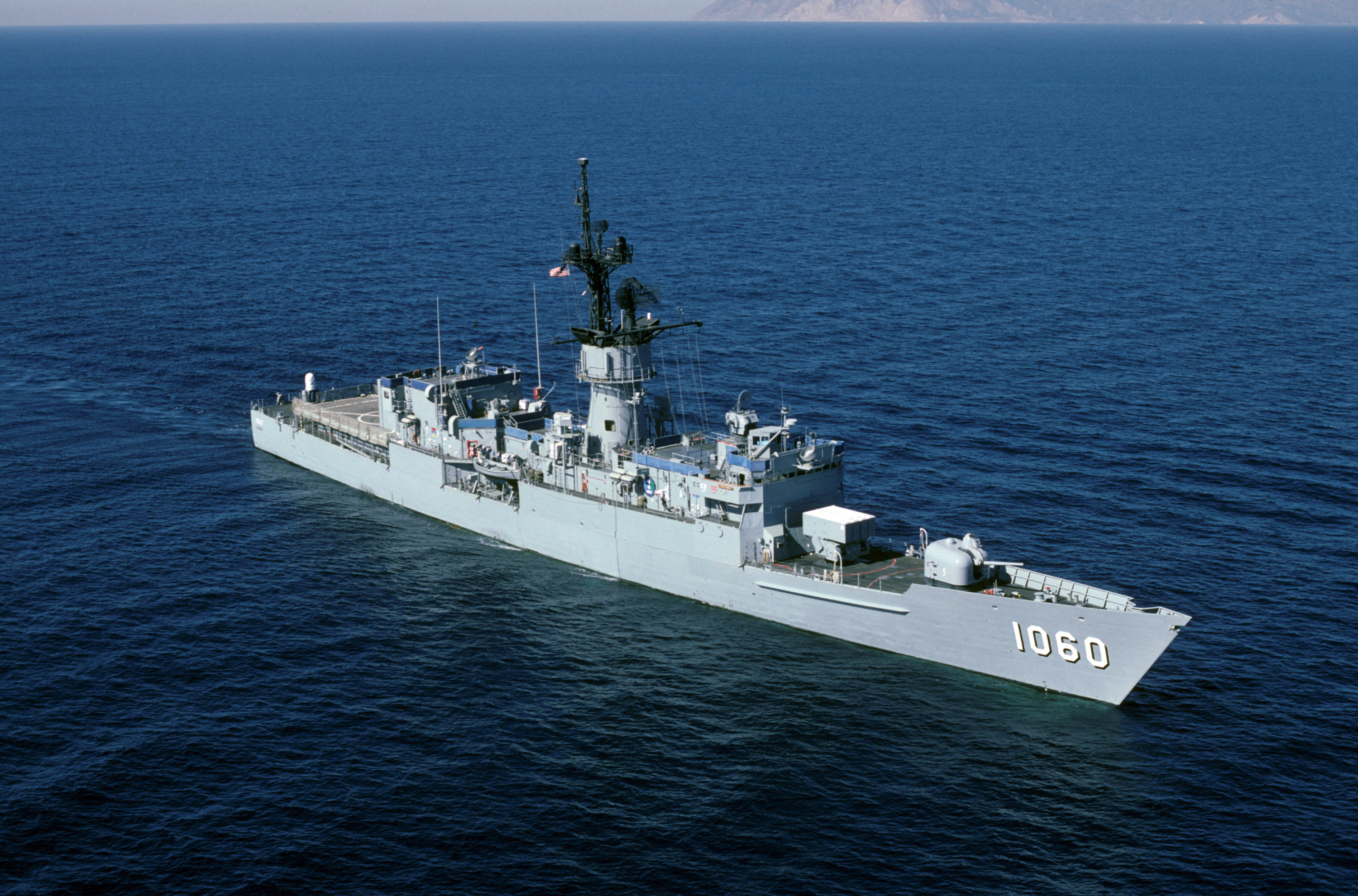
- USS Lang (FF-1060)

History

United States
- Name: Lang
- Namesake: John Lang
- Ordered: 22 July 1964
- Builder: Todd Shipyards, Los Angeles Division, San Pedro, California
- Laid down: 25 March 1967
- Launched: 17 February 1968
- Sponsored by: Mrs. Ephraim P. Holmes
- Acquired: 20 March 1970
- Commissioned: 28 March 1970
- Decommissioned: 12 December 1991
- Stricken: 11 January 1995
- Identification: FF-1060
- Motto: 1812–1970
- Fate: Sold for scrapping, 15 December 2001

General characteristics
- Class & type: Knox-class frigate
- Displacement: 3,250 tons (4,246 full load)
- Length: 438 ft (134 m)
- Beam: 46 ft 9 in (14.25 m)
- Draft: 24 ft 9 in (7.54 m)
- Propulsion: 2 × CE 1200psi boilers; 1 Westinghouse geared turbine; 1 shaft, 35,000 shp (26 MW)
- Speed: over 27 knots (31 mph; 50 km/h)
- Range: 4,500 nautical miles (8,330 km) at 20 knots (23 mph; 37 km/h)
- Complement: 18 officers, 267 enlisted
- Sensors & processing systems: AN/SPS-40 Air Search Radar; AN/SPS-67 Surface Search Radar; AN/SQS-26 Sonar; AN/SQR-18 Towed array sonar system; Mk68 Gun Fire Control System
- Electronic warfare & decoys: AN/SLQ-32 Electronics Warfare System
- Armament: one Mk-16 8 cell missile launcher for RUR-5 ASROC and Harpoon missiles; one Mk-42 5-inch/54 caliber gun; Mark 46 torpedoes from four single tube launchers); one Mk-25 BPDMS launcher for Sea Sparrow missiles later replaced by one Phalanx CIWS
- Aircraft carried: one SH-2 Seasprite (LAMPS I) helicopter

USS Lang (FF-1060) was a Knox-class frigate of the United States Navy, in service from 1970 to 1991. She was sold for scrapping in 2001. The ship was named for John Lang, the first man on USS Wasp to board HMS Frolic in the closing stage of action 18 October 1812, and his ardor and impetuosity carried the remainder of the boarding party with him.

== Construction ==
Lang was laid down by Todd Shipyards, Los Angeles Division, San Pedro, California, 25 March 1967; launched 17 February 1968; sponsored by Mrs. Ephraim P. Holmes, wife of Admiral Holmes, Commander in Chief, Atlantic Fleet, and Supreme Allied Commander, Atlantic Fleet. Lang was delivered 20 March 1970 and commissioned 28 March 1970.

== Design and description ==
The Knox-class design was derived from the Brooke-class frigate modified to extend range and without a long-range missile system. The ships had an overall length of 438 feet (133.5 m), a beam of 47 feet (14.3 m) and a draft of 25 feet (7.6 m). They displaced 4,066 long tons (4,131 t) at full load. Their crew consisted of 13 officers and 211 enlisted men.

The ships were equipped with one Westinghouse geared steam turbine that drove the single propeller shaft. The turbine was designed to produce 35,000 shaft horsepower (26,000 kW), using steam provided by 2 C-E boilers, to reach the designed speed of 27 knots (50 km/h; 31 mph). The Knox class had a range of 4,500 nautical miles (8,300 km; 5,200 mi) at a speed of 20 knots (37 km/h; 23 mph).

The Knox-class ships were armed with a 5"/54 caliber Mark 42 gun forward and a single 3-inch/50-caliber gun aft. They mounted an eight-round RUR-5 ASROC launcher between the 5-inch (127 mm) gun and the bridge. Close-range anti-submarine defense was provided by two twin 12.75-inch (324 mm) Mk 32 torpedo tubes. The ships were equipped with a torpedo-carrying DASH drone helicopter; its telescoping hangar and landing pad were positioned amidships aft of the mack. Beginning in the 1970s, the DASH was replaced by a SH-2 Seasprite LAMPS I helicopter and the hangar and landing deck were accordingly enlarged. Most ships also had the 3-inch (76 mm) gun replaced by an eight-cell BPDMS missile launcher in the early 1970s.

== Service history ==
On 17 October 1989, hours after the Loma Prieta earthquake, Lang left Treasure Island for Hunters Point, where she provided wet steam to the Pacific Gas and Electric Company. Through this effort, PG&E was able to quickly re-establish electrical services to San Francisco. For this effort Lang and her crew were awarded the Humanitarian Service Medal, which was later expanded to include all military members in the San Francisco Bay area at the time.

Lang was decommissioned 12 December 1991, stricken from the Naval Vessel Register 11 January 1995, and sold for scrapping on 15 December 2001.
