= Peter F. Silbernagel =

American politician (born 1950)

Member of the North Dakota House of Representatives from the 22nd district
- In office 2013–2016
- Succeeded by: Brandy Pyle

Personal details
- Born: May 9, 1950 (age 76) Linton, North Dakota
- Party: Republican
- Spouse: Cathy
- Children: three
- Profession: businessman/executive

Peter F. Silbernagel (born May 9, 1950) is an American politician. He has served as a Republican member for the 22nd district in the North Dakota House of Representatives since 2013.
