= Brandy Pyle =

American politician (born 1980)

Member of the North Dakota House of Representatives from the 22nd district
- Incumbent
- Assumed office December 1, 2016 Serving with Jonathan Warrey
- Preceded by: Peter F. Silbernagel

Personal details
- Born: September 11, 1980 (age 46)
- Party: Republican
- Spouse: Nicolas
- Children: 4
- Education: University of Minnesota (BS)

Brandy L. Pyle (born September 11, 1980) is an American politician who has served in the North Dakota House of Representatives from the 22nd district since 2016.

== Education and Career ==
Pyle graduated from the University of Minnesota with a bachelor’s in Finance and served on the Cass County Park Board before her election. She also served in the Minnesota National Guard for 6 years. Pyle is also a volunteer for the Fargo National Cemetery.

Pyle was interviewed in 2013 after two BNSF trains collided and their oil cars caught fire a few miles out from her family farm near Casselton, North Dakota.

== North Dakota House of Representatives ==
Pyle ran in 2016 for the open state house seat for district 22. Pyle and fellow Republican Michael Howe were elected in both the primary and general elections, defeating democrats Marijo and Allan Peterson. She would later be re-elected in 2020 and 2024.

Throughout her tenure, Pyle has voted against and been a vocal opponent to most culture war legislation, including book banning and funding cuts to Prairie Public Broadcasting In 2025, Pyle stated she felt regret for voting in favour of a bill that would call on the Supreme Court to overturn the decision that legalised gay marriage nationwide.

In 2021, Pyle was a leading voice in the effort to expel fellow representative Luke Simons of Dickinson over sexual harassment and misconduct allegations, Pyle being on the receiving end of some harassment alongside other legislators and capital interns. Pyle was interviewed frequently, specifically expressing frustration that Simons was doing fundraising work in the midst of the allegations reaching the public. On May 4, 2021, the house voted to expel Simons from the legislature 69-25.

Shortly after the 2026 North Dakota elections, house republicans nominated Pyle to serve as the next Speaker of the North Dakota House of Representatives.

== Personal life ==
Pyle is married to her husband, Nicolas, who she has 4 kids with. She is a member of the Westminster Presbyterian church.
