= USS Lang (DD-399) =

Benham-class destroyer

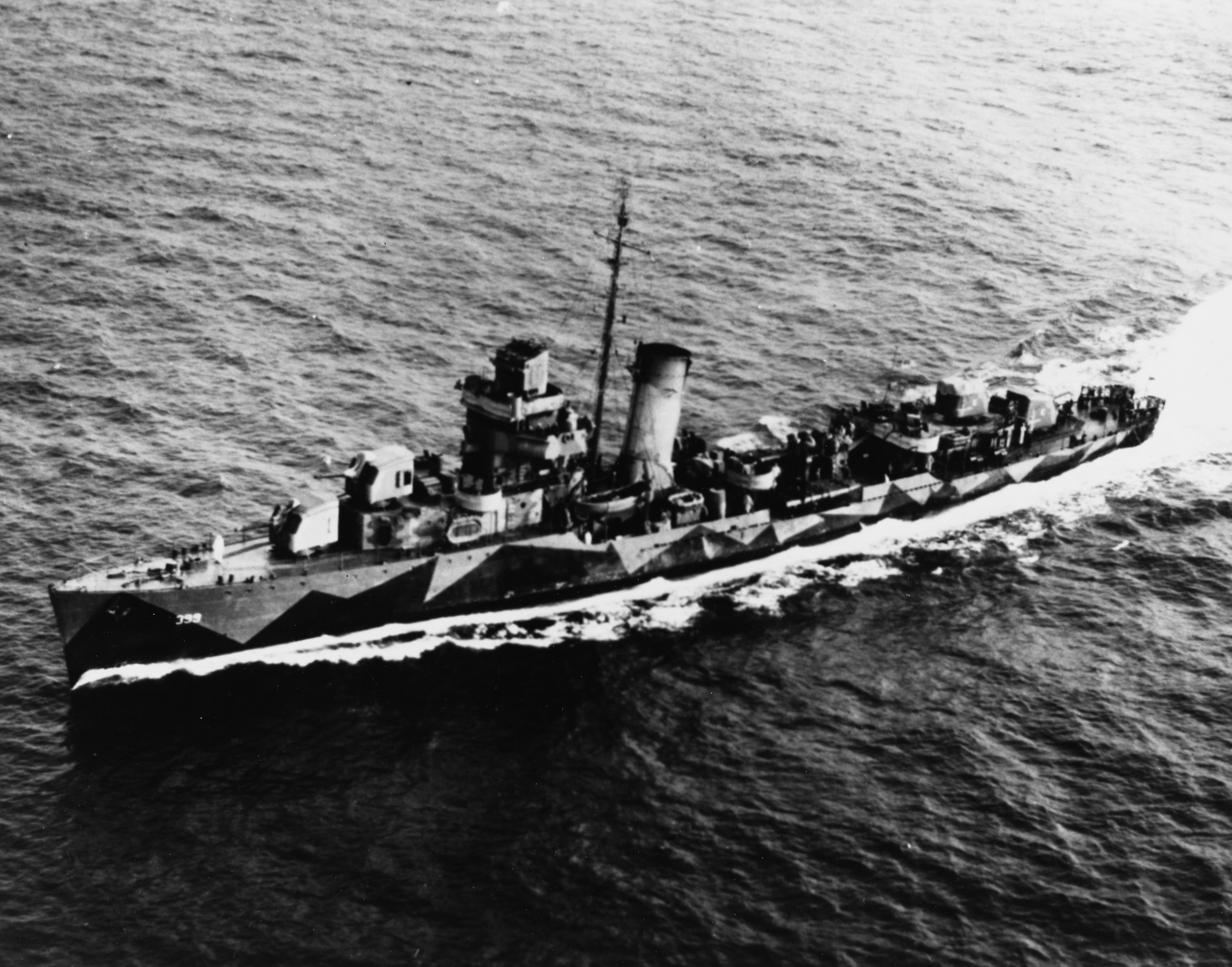

History

United States
- Namesake: John Lang
- Builder: Federal Shipbuilding & Dry Dock Company
- Laid down: 5 April 1937
- Launched: 27 August 1938
- Commissioned: 30 March 1939
- Decommissioned: 16 October 1945
- Fate: Scrapped, 31 October 1947

General characteristics
- Class & type: Benham-class destroyer
- Displacement: 1,725 tons
- Length: 341 ft 1 in
- Beam: 35 ft 6 in
- Draft: 10 ft 9 in
- Speed: 38.5
- Complement: 184 officers and enlisted
- Armament: 4 5-inch 38 caliber, 6 20 mm., 7 .50 cal (12.7 mm) guns. AA, 8 21" torpedo tubes, 2 depth charge racks

The first USS Lang (DD-399) was a Benham-class destroyer in the United States Navy during World War II. She was named after John Lang, a sailor in the United States Navy.

== History ==
Lang was laid down by the Federal Shipbuilding & Dry Dock Company, Kearny, New Jersey, 5 April 1937, launched 27 August 1938, sponsored by Mrs William D. Leahy, wife of Admiral William D. Leahy, Chief of Naval Operations and commissioned 30 March 1939.

Lang departed New York 12 August 1939 guarding President Franklin D. Roosevelt's passage to Campobello, Newfoundland and Nova Scotia. In November, the destroyer left Newport, Rhode Island, for Galveston, Texas and duty on the Gulf Patrol. Transferred to the Pacific, she reached San Diego 18 March 1940 and Pearl Harbor 2 April, where she participated in fleet training exercises. She voyaged between the West Coast and Hawaii for the remainder of 1940 and early 1941 engaged in escort duties and training.

In June 1941 she returned to the Caribbean and Atlantic coast for carrier and antisubmarine training. In December she acted as screen and aircraft guard during flight operations for Yorktown and Ranger off the Maine coast and Bermuda.

=== 1942 ===
She sailed to Annapolis Royal, Nova Scotia, for patrols with ships of the Royal Navy, then sailed for the British West Indies in January 1942. In transit, she answered a distress call from torpedoed SS Empire Wildebeeste and rescued 21 survivors. She left Bermuda on 18 March for Casco Bay, Maine and sailed 26 March escorting TF 39 which included carrier Wasp. The force rendezvoused with three British ships on 3 April and entered Scapa Flow, Scotland, the next day. The destroyer then became a part of Force "W", sailing between England and the Mediterranean to deliver Spitfires to the besieged island of Malta (see Operations Calendar and Bowery). Lang returned to Norfolk on 28 May and transferred to San Diego a month later.

As flagship for DesDiv 15, part of TF 18, Lang departed San Diego 1 July to join shore bombardment exercises off Tonga in preparation for the Guadalcanal-Tulagi landings. Three weeks later she screened Wasp as the carrier launched her aircraft in the first American land offensive of the Pacific war.

=== 1943 ===
Operating from the New Hebrides, Lang carried out patrol and escort missions in the effort to reconquer the Solomons. On 22 and 24 January 1943, she shelled Japanese positions near Kokumbona, Guadalcanal. In July, Lang and four other destroyers sailed for Kula Gulf escorting six APDs to the New Georgia landings. Early on the 18th, the American force sighted and attacked three Japanese destroyers forcing them to retire behind smokescreens. The ships completed their mission and sailed for Purvis Bay, located in the Nggela Islands, part of the Solomon Islands from which Lang and two other destroyers escorted five LCIs to the landings at Onaiavisi, New Georgia, on 31 July, where during an enemy air attack Lang claimed an aircraft shot down.

Lang', in company with five other destroyers, was tasked to intercept enemy forces in Vella Gulf, part of the “Tokyo Express” route. On the nights of 6 August and 7 August the task group sank three Japanese destroyers, Kawakaze, Arashi and Hagikaze, which had been attempting to reinforce Kolombangara. Two nights later they drove off groups of Japanese troop transports. After 3 months of escort duty. Lang joined TF 50 for the invasion of the Gilberts 23 to 30 November, bombarded Nauru on 9 December and early in the new year bombarded Roi, Namur.

=== 1944 ===
Then she joined TF 58 for the occupation of Kwajalein, returning to escort duties 15 March 1944. During the summer she operated with TF 58 during the Marianas campaign, screening the fast carrier force, returning to Tulagi on 17 August after the victory in the Marianas.

Lang next sailed to Wewak, New Guinea, 31 August to lay a minefield and shelled shore positions. She then escorted two reinforcement convoys bound for Morotai from 16 September to 3 October through heavy enemy air attacks. On 8 October she took the torpedoed Shelton (DE-407) in tow but she capsized and sank.

Lang departed Hollandia 10 October for the Leyte Gulf operation. Though she came under kamikaze attacks, she suffered no damage and claimed an enemy aircraft shot down. She departed the battle area for Manus on 31 October and on Christmas Day sailed with TF 78 for the Lingayen Gulf landings, where she was attacked by kamikazes and claimed another aircraft destroyed.

=== 1945 ===
She returned to Leyte Gulf on 16 January 1945 to escort a resupply echelon to Lingayen, patrolled the entrance to Lingayen until 28 January, then sailed to train in the Solomons for the Okinawa assault.

Departing Ulithi 27 March as flagship for ComDesDiv 4, Lang screened the transports of TF 53 to Okinawa. Under air attack from 12 to 29 April, Lang again incurred no damage and claimed another kamikaze. From 29 April to 17 May she screened three escort carriers providing air support for the Okinawa operations and then screened other flight operations near Okinawa till 11 June.

Lang departed the Pacific area of operations in June and arrived in San Francisco 3 July for repairs. On 25 August while En route to New York, she rescued two downed pilots. Lang decommissioned on 16 October 1945, was sold to George Nutman, Inc., Brooklyn, New York, 20 December and scrapped 31 October 1947.

== Honors ==
Lang received 11 battle stars for World War II service.
