= Jonathan Warrey =

American politician

Member of the North Dakota House of Representatives from the 22nd district
- Incumbent
- Assumed office November 11, 2022 Serving with Brandy Pyle
- Preceded by: Michael Howe

Personal details
- Party: Republican
- Spouse: Amy
- Children: 2
- Education: University of North Dakota (BS)

Jonathan Warrey is an American politician and businessman. He has served as a member of the North Dakota House of Representatives from the 22nd district since 2022, alongside Brandy Pyle. He is a member of the Republican Party.

== Career ==
Warrey graduated from the University of North Dakota with a bachelor's in marketing.

Warrey has worked in IT for most of his career, working specifically for Marco Technologies since 1996. He was promoted to Regional Sales Director in 2009 and later became Vice President of Sales in 2012 before becoming Chief Operating Officer in 2020.

He previously served on the Casselton Park Board.

== North Dakota House of Representatives ==
Warrey was appointed to the North Dakota House of Representatives on November 11, 2022, after representative Michael Howe was elected North Dakota Secretary of State. He would later run for and win re-election in 2024.

In his first elected term alone, Warrey serves as the chairman of the house Industry, Business, and Labor committee and as a member of the political subdivisions committee.

In 2025, Warrey would sponsor a bill to overhaul the health insurance plan for state employees, stating that it would provide more flexibility for the state and allow for more benefits to recipients. It would pass the house and the senate before being vetoed by governor Kelly Armstrong. Warrey would also submit a bill to establish a state Office of Entrepreneurship.

== Personal life ==
Warrey and his wife, Amy, have 2 children.
