= Dwayne A. King =

American politician

Dwayne A. King (born September 18, 1939) is an American politician.

King was born in Casselton, Cass County, North Dakota and was raised on a farm. He graduated from Lincoln High School, in Casselton, North Dakota, in 1957. He served in the United States Army in 1963 and 1964. He earned a bachelor's degree in mathematics from the University of North Dakota in 1961, followed by a bachelor's degree in civil engineering in 1965. King lived in Golden Valley, Minnesota with his wife and family. He worked for IBM as a staff instructor and as a system data processing engineer. He also served in the Minnesota House of Representatives in 1977 and 1978 and was a Democrat.
