= Layng =

Layng (/læŋ, leɪŋ/) is a variant of the surname Laing.

Notable people with the surname include:

- Henry Layng (died 1726), English Anglican priest
- Kathryn Layng (born 1960), American actress
- Mabel Frances Layng (1881–1937), British artist
- Thomas Layng (1892–1958), British soldier and clergyman

Notable people who have it as a first or middle name:

Layng Martine Jr., American songwriter
