= John Laing =

John Laing may refer to:

== People ==
- John Laing (bishop) (died 1483), bishop of Glasgow
- John Laing (bibliographer) (1809–1880), minister of the Free Church of Scotland
- Sir John Laing (businessman) (1879–1978), British entrepreneur and 2nd president of the John Laing Group
- John Laing (footballer) (1884–1944), Australian rules footballer
- John Laing (director) (fl. 1977– ), New Zealand film and television director
- Sir John Maurice Laing (1918–2008), senior executive of John Laing plc

== Other uses ==
- John Laing Group, a British infrastructure company

== See also ==
- John Lang (disambiguation)
- John Lange (disambiguation)
