= Jack Lang =

Jack Lang may refer to:

- Jack Lang (Australian politician) (1876–1975), premier of New South Wales from 1930 to 1932 and 1925 to 1927
- Jack Lang (American football) (1875–1923), American football player
- Jack Lang (French politician) (born 1939), French social democratic politician
- Jack Lang (sportswriter) (1921–2007), American sportswriter
- Jack Lang, co-founder of the Raspberry Pi Foundation

== See also ==
- John Lang (disambiguation)
