= John Lange =

John Lange may refer to:

- John Lange, a pen name of Michael Crichton
- John E. Lange, US Ambassador
- Johnny Lange, American songwriter, author and publisher
- John Frederick Lange, Jr, American author of the Gor novel series under the pen name John Norman
- Robert John "Mutt" Lange, South African record producer and songwriter
- Johann Peter Lange, a German Calvinist theologian and Bible commentator

== See also ==
- John Lang (disambiguation)
- John Laing (disambiguation)
