= James Lang (cricketer) =

English cricketer

James Neil Lang
Cricket information
- Batting: Left-handed
- Bowling: Slow left arm orthodox

Career statistics
Competition	First-class
Matches	8
Runs scored	27
Batting average	4.50
100s/50s	0/0
Top score	9*
Balls bowled	870
Wickets	8
Bowling average	51.50
5 wickets in innings	0
10 wickets in match	0
Best bowling	2/21
Catches/stumpings	4/0
- Source: Cricinfo, 16 August 2022

James Neil Lang (2 May 1900 – 1973) was an English first-class cricketer who played eight matches for Worcestershire in the early 1920s. He was born in Ludlow, Shropshire and died at Birmingham, Warwickshire.

Lang was not particularly successful, averaging over 50 with his left-arm spin and never reaching double figures with the bat. His first victim was Hampshire's Harold Gilligan, while his most successful game was his last, against Nottinghamshire, when he took three wickets including that of Wally Hammond.
