= W. Patrick Lang =

American novelist

Walter Patrick Lang Jr
- Born: Walter Patrick Lang Jr. May 31, 1940
- Died: April 5, 2023 (aged 83)
- Education: Virginia Military Institute
- Occupations: U.S. Army officer and intelligence analyst
- Relatives: John H. Lang (Uncle) Lt. Col Walter P. Lang (Father) Rollande B. Lang (Mother) John W. Lang (Brother) Maureen A. Lang (Sister)
- Military Service
- Allegiance: United States
- Branch: U.S. Army
- Rank: Colonel

Walter Patrick Lang Jr. (May 31, 1940 - April 5, 2023) was a commentator on the Middle East, a retired U.S. Army officer and private intelligence analyst, and an author. After leaving uniformed military service as a colonel, he held high-level posts in military intelligence as a civilian. He led intelligence analysis of the Middle East and South Asia for the Defense Department and world-wide HUMINT activities in a high-level equivalent to the rank of a lieutenant general.

== Background ==
Lang graduated from the Virginia Military Institute with a BA in English and from the University of Utah with an MA in Middle East studies. He was a member of Phi Kappa Phi.

== Personal life ==
He is married to the former Marguerite Lessard. They reside in Alexandria, Virginia.

His uncle is John H. Lang, who served in both World Wars and during the interwar period, with Canadian and U.S. military forces. He received military honors for his actions and bravery from the United Kingdom, United States and Japan.

== Military service ==
While serving in the U.S. Army, Lang graduated from the U.S. Army War College, the U.S. Army Command and General Staff College and the Armed Forces Staff College. He is a decorated veteran of several of the United States' overseas conflicts. During the Vietnam War, he served in the U.S. Army Special Forces and Military Intelligence.

He was trained and educated as a specialist in the Middle East and served in that region for many years. He was the first professor of Arabic at the United States Military Academy, where he was twice selected as best classroom teacher of the year.

As reported by The Chicago Tribune, he wrote that intercepted radio transcripts that showed the Israel Defense Forces knew they were attacking an American ship during the 1967 USS Liberty incident were used as “course material” in an advanced class for intelligence officers on the clandestine interception of voice transmissions: “The flight leader spoke to his base to report that he had the ship in view, that it was the same ship that he had been briefed on and that it was clearly marked with the U.S. flag.” He said the same thing in a later interview: “The flight commander was reluctant. That was very clear. He didn’t want to do this. He asked them a couple of times, ‘Do you really want me to do this?’ I’ve remembered it ever since. It was very striking. I’ve been harboring this memory for all these years.”

At the Defense Intelligence Agency, he was the defense intelligence officer (DIO) for the Middle East, South Asia and counter-terrorism, and later, the first director of the Defense Humint Service. At the DIA, he was a member of the Defense Senior Executive Service. He participated in the drafting of National Intelligence Estimates. From 1992 to 1994, all the U.S. military attachés worldwide reported to him.

He was also the head of intelligence analysis for the Middle East for seven or eight years at that institution. He was the head of all the Middle East and South Asia analysis in DIA for counter-terrorism for seven years. For his service in the DIA, Lang received the Presidential Rank Award of Distinguished Executive.

== Post-retirement activities ==
After leaving government service, he joined Veteran Intelligence Professionals for Sanity, but left that group over policy differences. For a period prior to and during the Iraq War, he registered under the U.S. Department of Justice's Foreign Agents Registration Act, for his work on behalf of a Lebanese politician and industrialist. He promoted the peace process, vocational training for the building trades, English and French-language instruction, and extending microcredit. He registered on advice of counsel and has since deregistered.

Continuing his work on the peace process, he participated in work of the Harry Frank Guggenheim Foundation. As an example: Imagining the Next War. The foundation sponsors individuals for "scholarly research on violence, aggression, and dominance." In 2006, Lang was appointed to the foundation's board of directors. Lang edited a personal blog Sic Semper Tyrannis on the subjects of intelligence gathering and analysis, military affairs, and war and peace.

== Selected writings ==
During his retirement from the U.S. Army, Lang has published many articles on intelligence, special operations and the Islamic World.

- "Drinking the Koolaid", Middle East Policy Journal, August 2004. In 2004, he wrote that members of the Bush Administration manipulated intelligence analysis to strengthen the case for the invasion of Iraq in 2003

Lang has written and discussed the 2006 Lebanon War, in which he described the Hezbollah defense as a defensive belt which he called the "Tabouleh Line". In an interview with Helena Cobban, he said:

A basic lesson of history is that one must win on the battlefield to dictate the peace. A proof of winning on the battlefield has always been possession of that battlefield when the shooting stops. Those who remain on the field are just about always believed to have been victorious. Those who leave the field are believed to be the defeated.

=== Iraq and the Middle East ===
In 2006, Lang said that he thought an American attack on Iran would have deadly repercussions on U.S. occupation troops in Iraq. He noted that "troops all over central and northern Iraq are supplied with fuel, food, and ammunition by truck convoy from a supply base hundreds of miles away in Kuwait. All but a small amount of our soldiers' supplies come into the country over roads that pass through the Shiite-dominated south of Iraq." Iraqi Shiia could easily interdict these supplies, not easily replaced by air, once hostilities start.

=== Conflict with Iran ===
In an interview in 2007, he stated that "the U.S. has no plans to bomb Iran," to mean that intensive planning is at an advanced stage but no final decision has been made to push the button. He said the forces are largely in place. The bombing could be carried out by naval air from the aircraft carriers in place, missiles from the screening ships of the carrier groups, and air force assets. He said there is dissent in the U.S. administration at high levels whether to bomb Iran, and it is possible for high level resignations to occur even in the uniformed services. He said the concentration of forces has a dual purpose, to prod Iran toward serious negotiations and to be there as a resort if negotiations fail.

=== Memoir ===
In December 2020, Lang published his memoir under the title TATTOO—A Memoir of Becoming. It was published by I-Universe. The 406-page autobiography offers a first-hand account of some of the most important events of the 20th century, starting with his uncle John Lang's Navy service in China during the pre-World War II period, his father's Army service in the Philippines and Germany, and Lang's own lengthy career after graduating from Virginia Military Institute, first in Army Special Forces, later in Military Intelligence and the Defense Intelligence Agency. Lang's account of his two tours of duty in Vietnam are vivid and capture the agony of that conflict from both a personal and strategic standpoint. His accounts of his service in the Middle East as a special advisor to the Iraqi Armed Forces during the Iran-Iraq War, as Military Attache in Yemen and Saudi Arabia, and his other special missions in the region is equally gripping and full of personal insights into U.S. policy.

=== 2nd edition of The Human Factor ===
In 2021 Lang published an updated book-length version of an earlier work under the title "The Human Factor: The Phenomena of Espionage." It was published by iUniverse. The book is a primer on the art of human intelligence, drawing on Lang's extensive experience recruiting agents while in the U.S. Army in Vietnam, and later as head of the Humint section of the Defense Intelligence Agency. The book draws upon the history of successful spy recruitment, including a critical review of the Cambridge Five spy network.

The original edition, Intelligence: The Human Factor, was published by Chelsea House, Philadelphia (2004) as a social sciences textbook on Human Intelligence Collection Operations.

=== The Portable Pat Lang ===
In December 2022, Lang released an anthology of his writings on intelligence, the Iraq War, Islam, the Middle East, and other critical topics. The volume, published by iUniverse, featured previously unpublished historical fiction, as well as his most important writings and speeches. The book is titled "The Portable Pat Lang."

=== Historical fiction ===
Based on his experience in the military and military intelligence and a lifelong interest in the American Civil War, Patrick Lang wrote three novels set in the American Civil War. The trilogy is called: "Strike The Tent: A Tale Of The Confederate Secret Services". His main character is Confederate agent Claude Devereux around whom the historical events unfold.

The first volume, The Butchers Cleaver, was published in 2007. In this book Claude Devereux, who like his whole family in Alexandria does neither support slavery nor secession, is forced by events into his role as Confederate agent.

The second volume, Death Piled Hard, was published in 2009. Devereux's brother Patrick is killed at Gettysburg. But there is not much time to mourn for Claude Devereux, who is slowly finding his way into command circles behind enemy lines.

The third volume, Down the Skies', was published in 2012. Confederate spy Devereux, by now Brigadier General of the Volunteer Union Forces, not only gained the confidence of president Lincoln but is also getting deeper and deeper insights into the whole administration. But he is suspected of disloyalty, and the Union's Counter-intelligence is on high alert.

== Legacy and honors ==
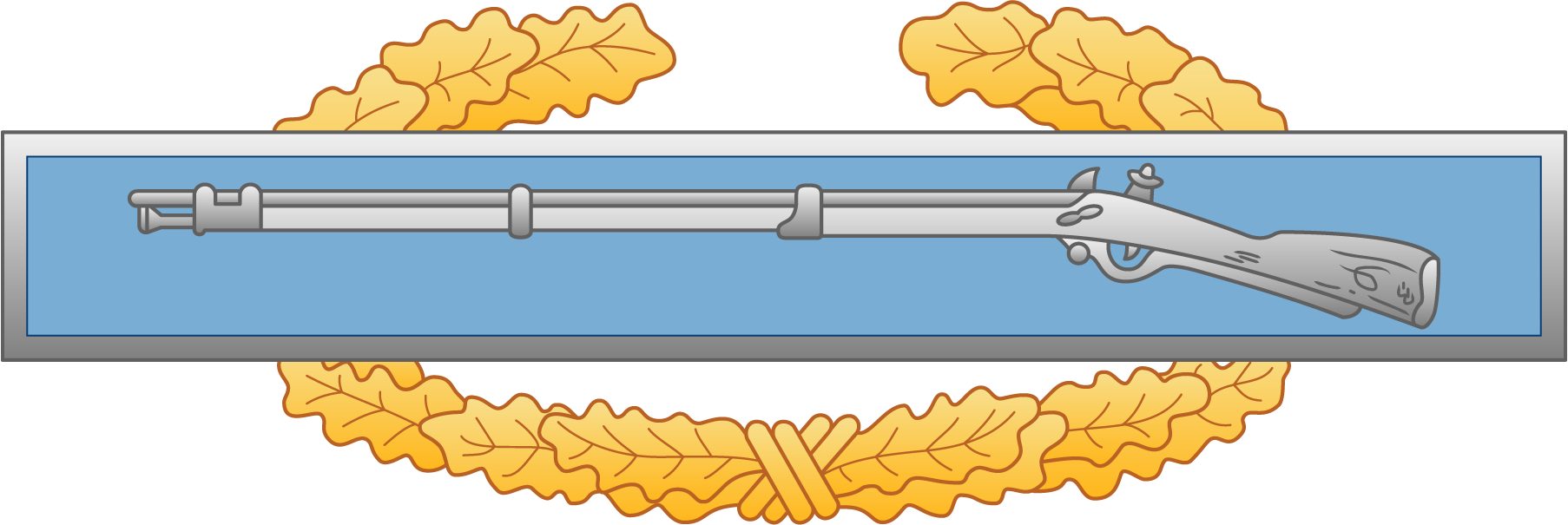
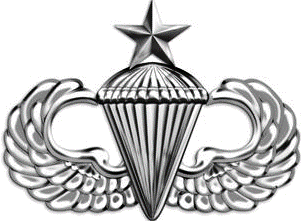
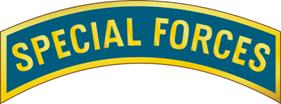
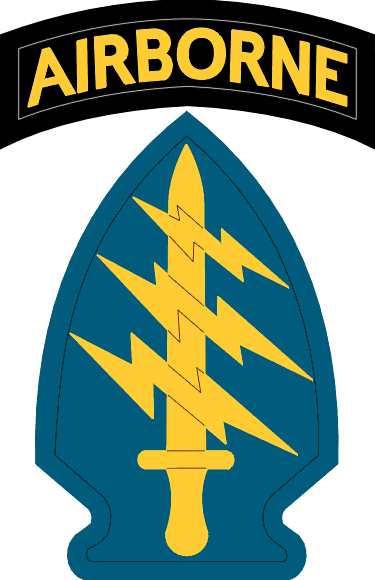
| Master Combat Infantryman Badge |
| Combat Infantryman Badge |
| Expert Infantryman Badge |
| Senior Parachutist Badge |
| U.S Army Special Forces Distinctive unit insignia |
| Special Forces Tab |
| United States Army Special Forces CSIB |
| Defense Superior Service Medal with 1 Oak Leaf Cluster |
| Legion of Merit with 1 silver Oak leaf cluster (5 awards) |
| Bronze Star with 1 Oak Leaf Cluster |
| Meritorious Service Medal with 2 Oak Leaf Clusters |
| Joint Service Commendation Medal |
| Army Commendation Medal with "V" device |
| National Defense Service Medal with 1 Service star |
| Armed Forces Expeditionary Medal |
| Vietnam Service Medal with 3 Campaign stars |
| Army Service Ribbon |
| Army Overseas Service Ribbon |
| Vietnam Campaign Medal with "60-" clasp |

== Books ==
- Intelligence: The Human Factor, Chelsea House Publishers, Philadelphia, PA, 2004 – a social sciences textbook on Human Intelligence Collection Operations (HUMINT)
- Memoir: Tattoo, A Memoir of Becoming, iUniverse Books, Bloomington, IN 12/30/2020- a military autobiography ISBN 9781663207685
- The Portable Pat Lang: Essential Writings on History, War, Religion, Strategy, iUniverse Books, Bloomington, IN 12/15/2022 ISBN 978-1-6632-4842-8
- Riebling, Mark. The Soldier Spy: The Covert Wars of an Army Colonel and the Tragedy of American Power, Knopf, New York, NY, 2026

Fiction:

- The Butcher's Cleaver (Volume One of the "Strike the Tent" trilogy), Rosemont Books, 2007, ISBN 978-0-595-47476-9
- Death Piled Hard (Volume Two of the "Strike the Tent" trilogy). iUniverse, 2009 ISBN 978-1-4401-2388-7
- Down The Sky (Volume Three of the "Strike the Tent" trilogy). iUniverse, 2012 ISBN 978-1-4697-7179-3
