= Alexander Laing (antiquary) =

Scottish antiquarian

- Born: 1778; Coull, Aberdeenshire
- Died: 20 April 1838
- Occupation: Antiquarian

Alexander Laing (1778 – 20 April 1838) was a Scottish antiquarian.

== Biography ==
Laing was the illegitimate son of an Aberdeen advocate named Michie. He was born at Coull, Aberdeenshire, in 1778. He was tolerably well educated and possessed good natural abilities, but his erratic temperament precluded his advancement. For some years previous to his death he was employed as a book canvasser and flying stationer, in allusion to which he was commonly known in the country as ‘Stashie Laing.’ The first of Laing's antiquarian writings, ‘The Caledonian Itinerary, or a Tour on the Banks of the Dee, with Historical Notes from the best Authorities,’ appeared at Aberdeen in 1819. During the three subsequent years Laing edited an annual, the first two issues of which were entitled ‘The Eccentric Magazine,’ and the third ‘The Lounger's Commonplace Book,’ being a collection of anecdotes, apophthegms, and literary and historical curiosities. In 1822, he published ‘Scarce Ancient Ballads never before published, with Notes,’ Aberdeen, 12mo, and in the following year a similar collection under the title ‘The Thistle of Scotland’ (Advocates' Library Cat.) In 1828, appeared his chief work, ‘The Donean Tourist, interspersed with Anecdotes and Ancient National Ballads,’ Aberdeen, 1828, 8vo, a volume on the history and traditions of the river Don, which, though somewhat loosely compiled, constitutes a rich mine of Scottish historical lore, and ‘exhibits,’ says Jervise, ‘an incredible amount of patience’ and labour (Epitaphs and Inscriptions, i. 284). This is the only work by Laing in the British Museum Library. His last work was ‘An Cluaran Albannach, a Repository of Ballads, many never before published, to which are appended copious Notes, Historical, Biographical, Illustrative, and Critical,’ Aberdeen, 1834, 12mo. Laing died on 20 April 1838 at Boltingstone, a roadside inn between Tarland and Strathdon, and was buried in the churchyard of Coldstone, Aberdeenshire.

All his works are now scarce and coveted by Scottish bibliophiles. ‘Not a ruin or a battlefield by Dee or Don, which history or tradition gave name to, but Laing visited and viewed with a devotion almost sacred in its intensity. Ballads, family histories and genealogies, in all the unmethodical delightfulness of a tinker's wallet, lay jumbled up in his capacious brain, to be reproduced in various books with a confusing prolixity’ (Walker, Bards of Bonaccord, p. 650).
