= Karl Nikolaus Lang =

Swiss physician and naturalist

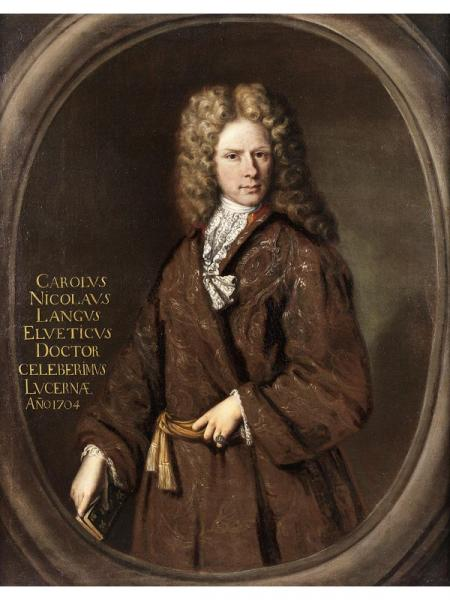
Portrait of Karl Nikolaus Lang.

Karl Nikolaus Lang (18 February 1670 – 2 May 1741) was a Swiss physician and naturalist who collected fossils and questioned explanations based on the Biblical floods but came up with his own hypothesis that fossils were formed from seeds into the ground.

== Life and work ==
Lang was born in Lucerne to Johann Jakob and Maria Barbara Meyer. Johann Paul Carl von Moll was his uncle. He studied philosophy and theology at Freiburg im Bresigau, graduating in 1687 after which he studied in Bologna and Rome, receiving a doctorate in 1692. He then served a military doctor and in 1699 became physician for Waldshut. He became a physician to Austrian officials and in 1708, he moved back to Lucerne. He served in the city council.

Lang began to collect rocks, minerals and fossils and established a museum in Lucerne. He published a book Idea Historiae naturalis Lapidum figuratorum Helvetiae on his collection in 1705 with several later editions. He influenced Voltaire with his idea that fossils were not caused by Biblical floods but suggested, like the ideas of Edward Lhuyd, that they were germs scattered through the air, planted into the ground and grown in the heat of the earth. His membership to the Royal Society of London was opposed by the diluvianist John Woodward. He also studied rinderpest and ergotism.
