= William Laing (bookseller) =

Scottish bookseller

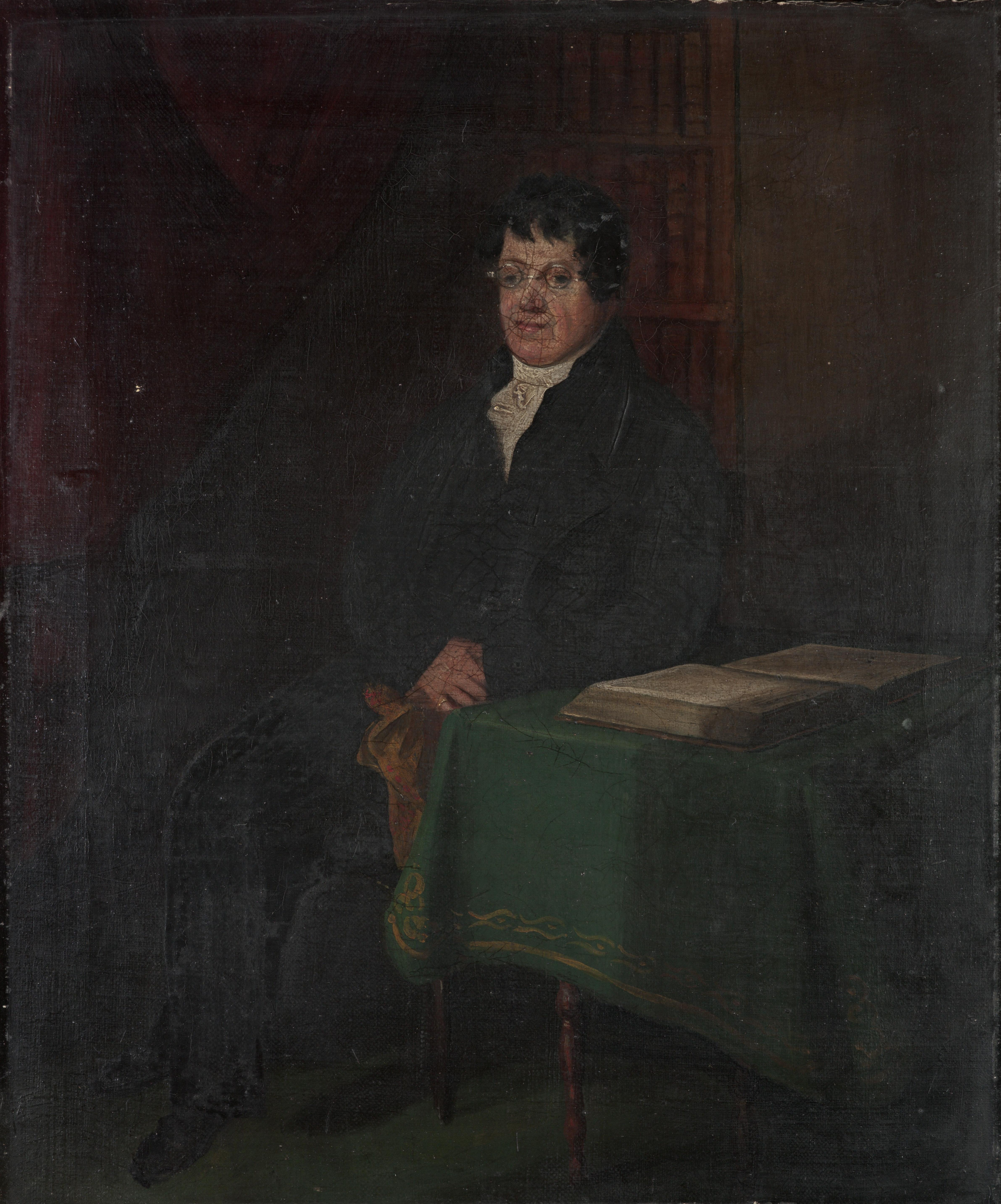
- Laing by Alexander Carse
- Born: 20 July 1764; Edinburgh, Scotland
- Died: 10 April 1832 (aged 67); Lauriston, Edinburgh, Scotland
- Occupation: Bookseller

William Laing (20 July 1764 – 10 April 1832) was a Scottish bookseller.

== Biography ==
Laing was born in Edinburgh on 20 July 1764, was educated at the grammar school in the Canongate. Leaving school in 1779 he was apprenticed to a printer, but left that employment in consequence of defective eyesight, and set up in 1785 as a bookseller in the Canongate. He subsequently removed lower down the street to Chessel's Buildings, where he remained until 1803, when he removed to South Bridge. From 1786 he began to issue annual catalogues, and his reputation as a collector of and authority on best editions and valuable books generally, both English and foreign, steadily increased. That as a collector he was not only indefatigable, but also intrepid, is shown by his visit to revolutionary Paris in 1793. Learning in 1799 that Christian VII of Denmark had been advised to dispose of the numerous duplicates in the Royal Library at Copenhagen, and being instigated by Barthold Georg Niebuhr the historian, then a student at Edinburgh University, Laing promptly journeyed to Denmark and negotiated the purchase of the duplicates from the king's librarian, Dr. Daniel Gotthilf Moldenhawer. He made a rapid tour in search of book rarities in France and Holland during the breathing space afforded by the peace of Amiens. When the war recommenced he devoted his attention to the production in Edinburgh of a worthy edition of the Greek classics. He commenced this attempt in 1804 by the publication of "Thucydides, Græce et Latine; accedunt indices: ex editione Wassii et Dukeri," in 6 vols. sm. 8vo. This was followed by editions of Herodotus and Xenophon, to which Laing contemplated adding the works of Plato and Demosthenes, but was prevented by the difficulty of procuring competent editors. Towards the close of his life Laing, who had acquired considerable wealth, and whose shop had become a "veritable Herculaneum of the treasures of past ages," became one of the original directors of the Commercial Bank of Scotland. He died at his house, Ramsay Lodge, Lauriston, Edinburgh, on 10 April 1832, leaving a widow and nine children. His second son, David Laing the antiquary (1793–1878), is separately noticed.
