= William Laing (artist) =

Canadian artist (born 1994)

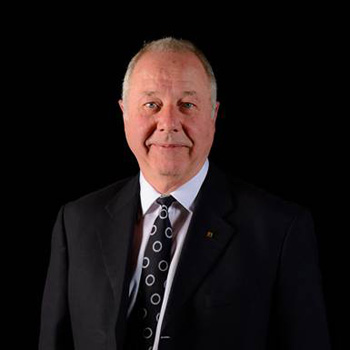
William Laing

William (Bill) Laing (born 1944) is a Scottish/Canadian artist based in Calgary, Alberta. He is known for his printmaking and sculpture.

== Early life and education ==
Laing was born in Glasgow, Scotland and immigrated to Canada in 1960. He studied at the Vancouver School of Art from 1967 - 1971 graduating with an honours diploma in Photography and Printmaking. He studied printmaking at the Brighton Polytechnic in England, and received his master's degree from the Royal College of Art in London, England in 1974. He then took teacher training at the Southern Alberta Institute of Technology in Calgary, Alberta. During his education he taught art classes part-time at several institutions.

== Career ==
Laing participated in his first art exhibition in 1970, British Columbia's Young Contemporary Exhibition, and was presented with the Canada Packers Award for Printmaking. His work was included in three graphics and print shows in 1971, including one in New York. During the next three years, before graduating from college, he participated in more than thirty group exhibitions in England, Canada, the United States, Sweden, Poland and Switzerland. His first solo exhibition was at the Vancouver Community Arts Council Gallery, and in 1973 he exhibited at the Die Treppe Gallery in Lahr, West Germany.

Laing taught printmaking, photography and design at the Alberta College of Art and Design from 1974 until 1977, when he was hired to teach at the University of Calgary. He taught there for 39 years, becoming a professor in 1989 and retiring at the end of 2015. During that time he was a visiting artist and lecturer at a number of colleges and art institutions throughout Canada, acted as a juror at art shows and a panelist at several conferences. He was awarded the University of Calgary Student Union Teaching Excellence Award in 2006, 2011, 2012 and 2013 and was also the University of Calgary Student Union Teaching Excellence "Hall of Fame Award" in 2013.

Laing has exhibited in over 500 group shows and 50 solo shows across Canada and around the world. In 1997 a retrospective of his work, William Laing, a Journey, was exhibited in Kelowna, BC. As of 2016, his most recent group exhibitions have been the 8th Douro Biennial in Alijo, Portugal and the Kyoto Hanga in Japan. Since 2010 he has mounted five solo exhibitions in the Edge Gallery, Canmore and the Herringer Kiss Gallery in Calgary, Alberta.

Throughout his career Laing has been the recipient of many travel, project and research grants, including several from the Canada Council for the Arts and the Alberta Foundation for the Arts. His artwork is included in the collections of more than one hundred public and private institutions, including the National Gallery of Canada, the University of Alberta, the Museum of Art in Strasbourg, France, the Saidye Bronfman Centre in Montreal, the National Gallery of Australia, the J. Paul Getty Museum, the Los Angeles County Museum, the Kyoto Museum of Art in Japan, the Guangdong Museum of Art in Shanghai, China and the Ashmolean Museum in Oxford, England.

Laing has been commissioned to create steel sculptures in Vancouver, British Columbia, for the Wilkinson Steel Company of Canada, the Pacific National Exhibition, and Wallace Neon. He has also been commissioned to design prints for Steel Case Canada, a wine label for J. Webb Wine Store, a one dollar stamp for Canada Post illustrating Canada's National Parks, a mural for the Arts 17 Society in Calgary, Alberta, and a C.D. cover for the "Verismo" Jazz Group.

== Associations ==
Laing was an executive member of the British Printmakers Council and the Print and Drawing Council of Canada. He was an associate of the Royal College of Art in London, England. He was a past chairman of the Calgary Review Committee of Alberta Art Foundation and a director of the Alberta Printmakers Society. He was appointed to the Royal Canadian Academy of Arts and was elected an honorary fellow of the Royal Society of Painters and Printmakers and a member of the Order of The University of Calgary.

== Publications ==
- Bill Laing' by Bradford Collins, Vie Des Arts, September 1974 (Montreal, Quebec)
- Current Energies' by Geoffrey James, Arts Canada, June 1975 (Ottawa, Ontario)
- Recent Drawings, Bill Laing and Dennis Evans at Glenbow' by Andrew Oko, Catalogue April 1977 (Calgary, Alberta)
- Bill Laing at the Mendal' by George Moppett, Catalogue, Mendal Art Gallery, March 1977 (Saskatoon, Saskatchewan)
- About Line and Face: Recent Work by Bill Laing' by Elizabeth Kidd, Catalogue Essay Museum of the Canadian Rockies
- Tables Turned' Catalogue Essay by Franklyn Heisler, Guest Curator, White Museum of Canadian Rockies, Banff, Alberta
- Victoria's Sense of Place', Arts B.C., Spring 87, Vol. II, Number 2
- Alberta Printmakers ' Society Exhibition', Muttart Gallery Newsletter, 1990 Volume III, Issue10.
- Still Lives", by Richard Whyte, Muttart Gallery Magazine, 1992, Volume 4, Issue 7, 1992.
- La Sugerentey Doble Mirada', de Bill Laing by. Derek Besant, Lo Epoco 26 January 1995, Santiago, Chile.
- Grabado a Dos Tiempos', en el Instituto Cultural de Providencia, 18 January 1995, Santiago, Chile.
- Artistas Canadienses Exponen En Providencia, Santiago, Chile, 22 January 19 95.
- "Wandering" by Paul Woodrow, Catalogue Essay, "William Laing: A Journey", 1996. ISBN 0889532206
- "The Journey" by Tim Mara, Catalogue Essay. "William Laing: A Journey" 1996. ISBN 0889532206
- "Millennium Portfolio" by Ann Severenson for F.F.W.D. Calgary, Alberta, September 23, 1999
- "34 at 54" by Mark Walton for F.F.W.D. Calgary, Alberta September 2, 1999
- Catalogue Essay for Exhibition "Out of Print: the New Wave of Printmaking in Alberta" by Deborah Herringer, Triangle Art Gallery of Visual Arts, Calgary, Alberta
- Catalogue Essay for exhibition "Troi Sieme Biennale de la Gravure d'lle de France" by Frank Borota presented by Orangerie due Domaine de Madame Elizabeth, Versailles, France June 1, 2001
- Catalogue essay for exhibition "Extension Maxi Graphica" by Hideki Kimura, presented by Kyoto Municipal Museum, November 22, 2001, Japan
