= John Laing (footballer) =

Australian rules footballer (1884–1944)

Personal information
- Full name: John Albert Laing
- Born: 5 July 1884; Golden Square, Victoria
- Died: 29 October 1944 (aged 60); Malvern, Victoria
- Original team: Scotch College

Playing career^{1}
Years	Club	Games (Goals)
1908, 1912	University	8 (1)
- ^{1} Playing statistics correct to the end of 1912.

John Albert Laing (5 July 1884 – 29 October 1944) was an Australian rules footballer who played with University in the Victorian Football League (VFL).

After his football career, Laing became a highly successful engineer and served as president of the Institute of Engineers (Victoria) in 1935.

== Sources ==
- Holmesby, Russell & Main, Jim (2007). The Encyclopedia of AFL Footballers. 7th ed. Melbourne: Bas Publishing.
- John Laing's playing statistics from AFL Tables
