= Gerald Lang =

British philosopher

Education
- Education: University of Bristol (BSc), University of Oxford (BPhil, DPhil)

Philosophical work
- Era: 21st-century philosophy
- Region: Western philosophy
- Institutions: University of Leeds
- Main interests: political philosophy, ethics

Gerald Lang is a British philosopher and Professor at the University of Leeds. He is known for his works on ethics and political philosophy.

== Books ==
- Strokes of Luck: A Study in Moral and Political Philosophy. Oxford: Oxford University Press, 2021
- Helen Frowe and Gerald Lang (eds.), How We Fight: Ethics in War, Oxford University Press, 2014
- Ulrike Heuer and Gerald Lang (eds.), Luck, Value, and Commitment: Themes From the Ethics of Bernard Williams, Oxford University Press, 2012
