= David Laing (antiquary) =

Scottish antiquary

David Laing LLD (20 April 1793 – 18 October 1878) was a Scottish antiquary.

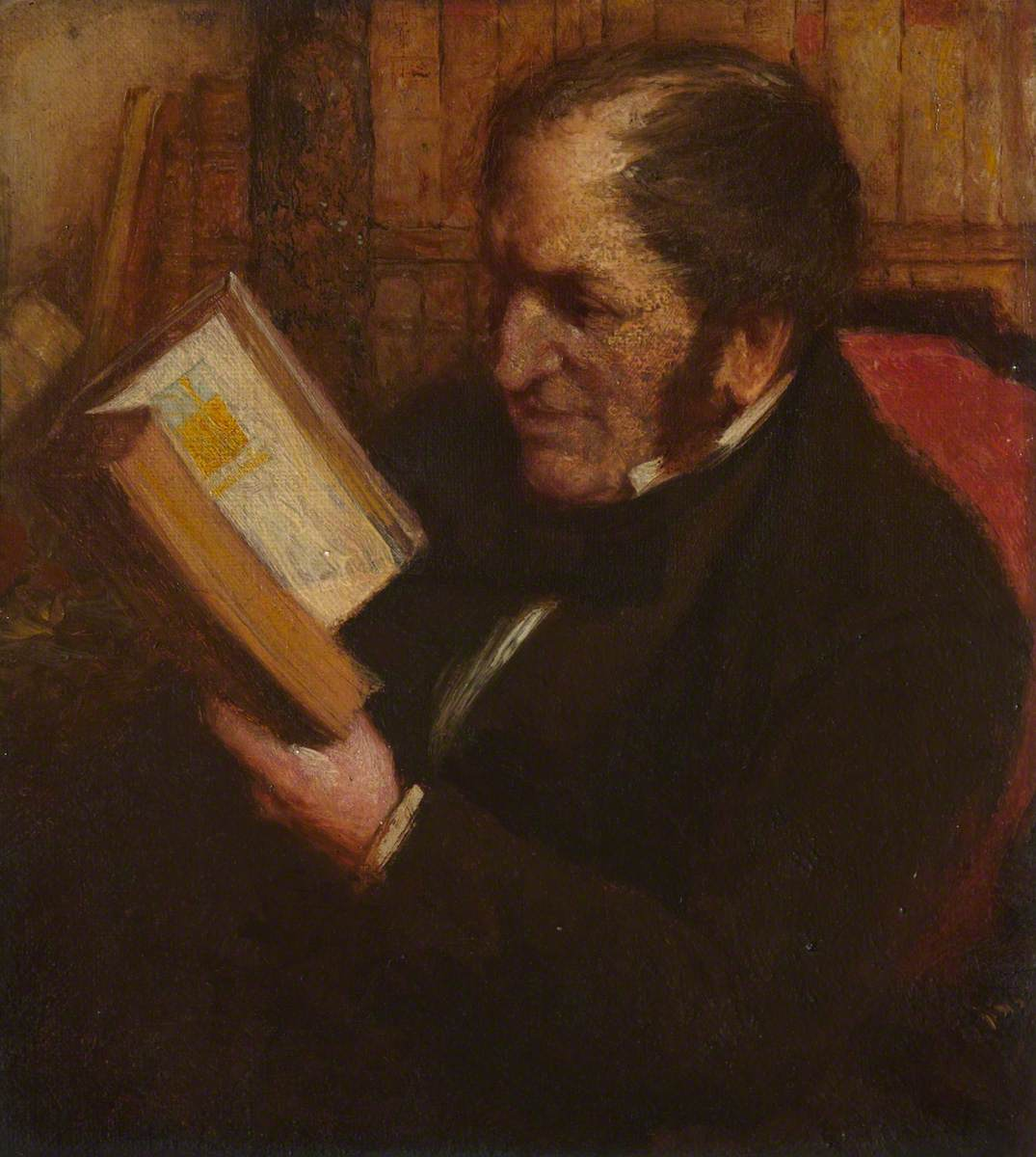
David Laing

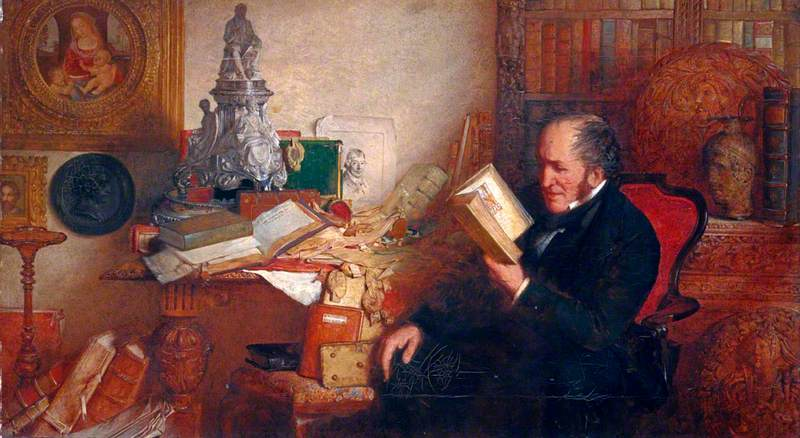
Sir William Fettes Douglas

== Life ==
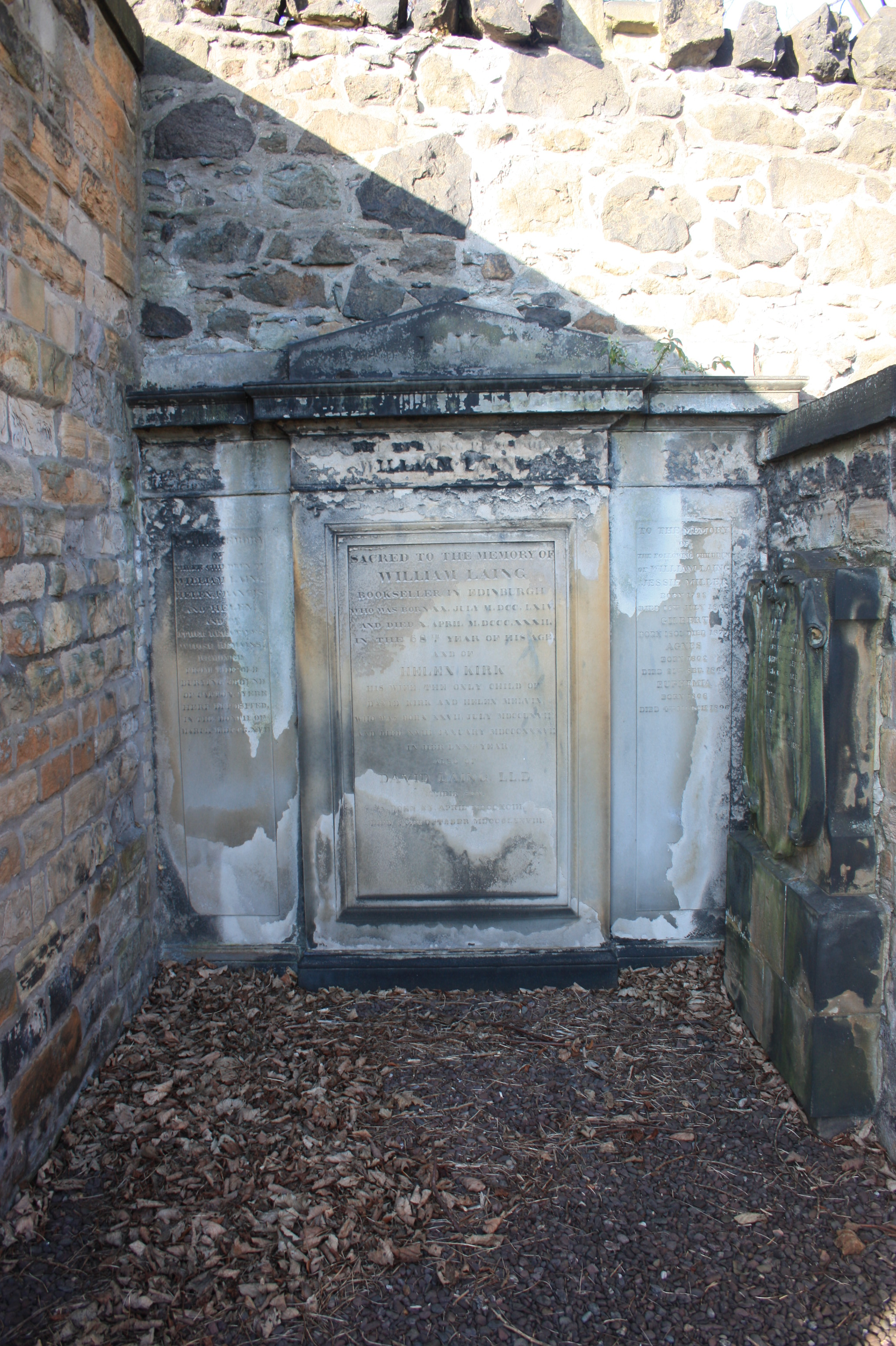
The grave of David Laing, New Calton Burial Ground, Edinburgh

Laing was born on 20 April 1793, the son of William Laing (1761–1831), a bookseller in Edinburgh, and his wife Helen Kirk. They lived and worked from the head of Chessels Court on the Canongate.

He was educated at Canongate Grammar School and then attended the University of Edinburgh. At the age of 14 he was apprenticed to his father. They formed W & D Laing Booksellers at 49 South Bridge, living at Ramsay Lodge at 66 Lauriston in 1830. Shortly after the death of his father in 1837, Laing was elected to be Librarian of the Signet Library replacing Macvey Napier, a post he retained until his death. Apart from general bibliographical knowledge, Laing was best known as a student of the literary and artistic history of Scotland.

In 1864 he was awarded an honorary doctorate (LLD) by the University of Edinburgh.

Laing was struck with paralysis in October 1878 while in the Signet Library, and it is said that, on recovering consciousness, he looked about and asked if a proof of Wyntoun had been sent from the printers. He died a few days afterwards, aged 85, at his home, 68 Promenade in Portobello. He is buried in New Calton Burial Ground in east Edinburgh. The grave lies on the north wall near the northeast corner.

His library was sold at auction by Sotheby, Wilkinson & Hodge over a period of 31 days, and realised £16,137. He bequeathed his collection of manuscripts to the University of Edinburgh.

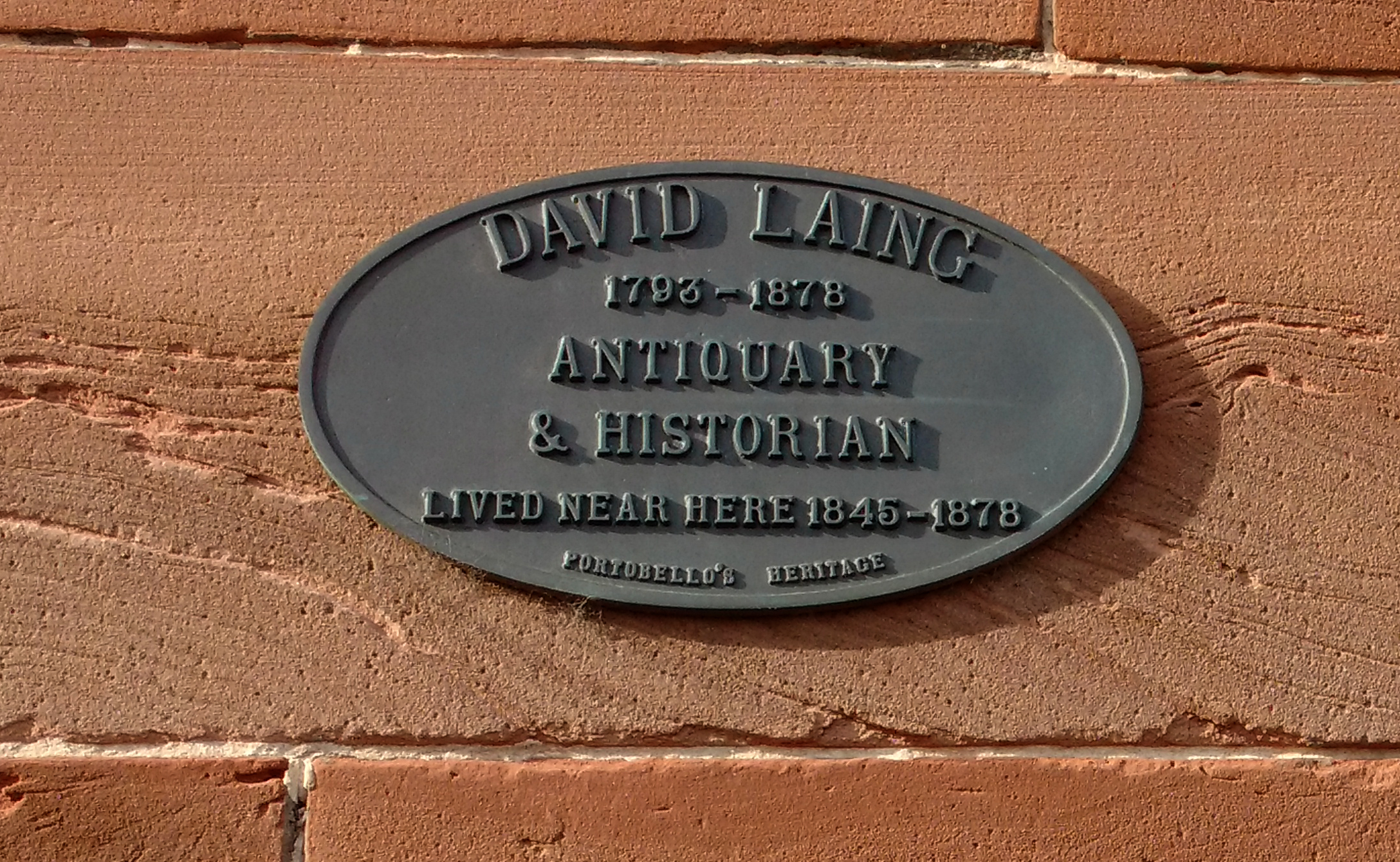
Plaque in James Street in Portobello

== Works ==
Laing published no original books but edited the works of others. Of these, the major ones are: William Dunbar's Works (2 vols., 1834), with a supplement added in 1865; Robert Baillie's Letters and Journals (3 vols.; 1841–42); John Knox's Works (6 vols.; 1846–64); Poems and Fables of Robert Henryson (1865); Andrew of Wyntoun's Orygynale Cronykil of Scotland (3 vols.; 1872–79); and Sir David Lyndsay's Poetical Works (3 vols.; 1879).

For over 50 years, Laing was a member of the Society of Antiquaries of Scotland, and contributed over 100 papers to its Proceedings. He was an original member of and the long-standing secretary to the Bannatyne Club, many of whose publications were edited by him.
