= Johann Peter Lange =

German Protestant theologian (1802–1884)

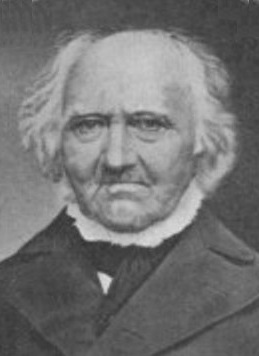
Johann Peter Lange

Johann Peter Lange (German: [ˈlaŋə]; 10 April 1802 in Sonnborn (now a part of Wuppertal) – 9 July 1884, Bonn) was a German Calvinist theologian of peasant origin.

== Biography ==
He was born at Sonnborn near Elberfeld, and studied theology at Bonn (from 1822) under K. I. Nitzsch and G. C. F. Lücke, held several pastorates, and eventually (1854) settled at Bonn as professor of theology in succession to Isaac August Dorner, becoming also in 1860 counsellor to the Coblence Consistory of the old-Prussian Rhenish Ecclesiastical Province.

== Theology ==
"Lange has been called the poetical theologian par excellence: “It has been said of him that his thoughts succeed each other in such rapid and agitated waves that all calm reflection and all rational distinction become, in a manner, drowned” (F. Lichtenberger).

As a dogmatic writer, he belonged to the school of Schleiermacher. His Christliche Dogmatik (5 volumes, 1849–1852; new edition, 1870) “contains many fruitful and suggestive thoughts, which, however, are hidden under such a mass of bold figures and strange fancies and suffer so much from want of clearness of presentation, that they did not produce any lasting effect” (Otto Pfleiderer)."

== Writings ==
His other works include Das Leben Jesu (3 volumes, 1844–1847; Eng. trans. 1864 and 1872), Das apostolische Zeitalter (2 volumes, 1853–1854), Grundriss der theologischen Encyklopädie (1877), Grundriss der christlichen Ethik (1878), and Grundriss der Bibelkunde (1881). In 1857 he undertook with other scholars a Theologisch-homiletisches Bibelwerk, to which he contributed commentaries on the first four books of the Pentateuch, Haggai, Zechariah, Malachi, Matthew, Mark, Revelation. The Bibelwerk was translated into English, enlarged and revised under the general editorship of Philip Schaff, with assistance of other scholars from the United States of various denominations, under the title A Commentary on the Holy Scriptures, Critical, Doctrinal, and Homiletical (25 volumes, New York: Charles Scribner's Sons, 1865–80).
