= John H. Lang =

American soldier and sailor (1899–1970)

John Lang
- Lang immediately after the sinking of USS Panay, 1937
- Born: 1899; Casselton, North Dakota, United States
- Died: 1970 (aged 70–71)
- Burial place: Ashes scattered in the Pacific Ocean
- Military career
- Allegiance: Canada; United States
- Branch: Canadian Army, United States Navy
- Service years: 1917 (Canada); 1937 (United States)
- Units: Black Watch (Royal Highland Regiment); USS Panay (PR-5)
- Conflicts: World War 1 World War 2
- Awards: Distinguished Service Medal (United Kingdom); Navy Cross

John Henry Lang (1899–1970) was an American, who served with the Canadian Army in World War I and the United States Navy through World War II at the end of his career. He earned military awards and honors for heroic service from the United Kingdom, the United States, and Japan in the first half of the twentieth century.

== Early life and education ==
John H. Lang was born in Casselton, North Dakota, in 1899. He attended local schools in Felton, Minnesota, and started working there.

== Military career ==
In 1916, with the beginning of World War 1, at the age of 17, Lang left North Dakota to enlist in the Canadian Army at Milwaukee, Wisconsin. After service in England and France in the Canadian Engineers, Lang transferred to the Canadian Black Watch Infantry. He was seconded to the Royal Highland Regiment (the British Black Watch), with whom he participated in the Third Battle of Ypres in 1917, during World War 1. He was awarded the British Distinguished Service Medal (DSM) for his actions in that engagement.

Upon his return from Europe at the end of the First World War, Lang enlisted in the United States Navy. Lang served for most of his navy career in the China Fleet, where he was quartermaster in the ship's company of several gunboats. In the 1920s, he was awarded the US Navy Cross and the Japanese Order of the Chrysanthemum for his heroism during a combined Japanese/US naval operation on the Yangtze River against Chinese warlord forces. The Chinese had besieged the foreign diplomatic legations on the river.

For his actions during and after the bombing of the USS Panay by Imperial Japanese forces in 1937, during Japan's conquest of China, Lang was awarded the Navy Cross for the second time. As Chief Quartermaster, he helped ensure wounded survivors were put aboard lifeboats and was one of the last men on the sinking ship. The Japanese planes strafed the marshes where survivors of the sinking had taken cover. Lang was wounded several times in this encounter.

During World War 2, Lang served with the commissioning crew of the battleship USS Massachusetts and participated in the naval landings in Morocco. He commanded a Landing Ship Tank (LST) until she was sunk in the invasion of the Admiralty Islands.

He next served as executive officer of the Underwater Demolition Team (UDT) Number 2. He was directing the "Frogman" unit to remove a moored Japanese mine on a reef off Saipan when another mine nearby detonated. It killed several comrades and wounded Lang severely. After two years' recuperation, he was retired from the US Navy in the grade of Chief Warrant Officer.

After his death, at his request, his ashes were scattered in the Pacific Ocean.

He is the uncle of W. Patrick Lang, a retired military officer, private intelligence analyst, and author.
