= John Lang (sailor) =

United States Navy seaman

John Lang (17 June 1794 – 1850) was a sailor in the United States Navy.

Born in Curaçao, Dutch West Indies, Lang was a resident of New Brunswick, New Jersey. Lang was a seaman on board Wasp during her engagement with HMS Frolic 18 October 1812. He was the first man to board the British ship in the closing stage of the action, and his ardor and impetuosity carried the remainder of the boarding party with him.

USS Lang (DD-399) and USS Lang (FF-1060) were named for him.
