= Alex Laing (footballer) =

New Zealand footballer

Personal information
- Full name: Alex Laing
- Place of birth: New Zealand
- Position: Goalkeeper

Senior career*
Years	Team	Apps	(Gls)
- Western

International career
1948	New Zealand	1	(0)
- * Club domestic league appearances and goals

Alex Laing is a former association football goalkeeper who represented New Zealand at international level.

Laing made a solitary official international appearance for New Zealand in a 0–4 loss to Australia on 4 September 1948.
