= James Laing (footballer) =

Scottish footballer

Personal information
- Full name: James Higgins Laing
- Date of birth: 1897
- Place of birth: Kilsyth, Scotland
- Date of death: 23 April 1917 (aged 19)
- Place of death: near Rœux, France
- Position: Inside right

Senior career*
Years	Team	Apps	(Gls)
- East Stirlingshire
1916–1917	Falkirk	1	(0)
- * Club domestic league appearances and goals

James Higgins Laing (1897 – 23 April 1917) was a Scottish footballer who made one appearance in the Scottish League for Falkirk as an inside right.

== Personal life ==
Prior to his service in the First World War, Laing worked as an engineer for Carron Company. He attested in the Army on 8 December 1915 and was called up to the Argyll and Sutherland Highlanders in September 1916. Serving as a private, Laing was posted to the Western Front in January 1917 and was hospitalised the following month, suffering from frostbite. He returned to his battalion in April and ten days later, on 23 April 1917, he was killed in an attack on Rœux during the Battle of the Scarpe. Laing was buried in Rœux British Cemetery.

== Career statistics ==
Appearances and goals by club, season and competition
Club	Season	League			Scottish Cup		Total	
Club	Season	Division	Apps	Goals	Apps	Goals	Apps	Goals
Falkirk	1916–17	Scottish First Division	1	0	―		1	0
Career total			1	0	0	0	1	0
