= National Register of Historic Places listings in Pasadena, California =

Location of Pasadena in Los Angeles County, California

This is intended to be a complete list of the properties and districts on the National Register of Historic Places in the city of Pasadena, California, United States. The locations of National Register properties and districts for which the latitude and longitude coordinates are included below, may be seen in an online map.

There are more than 500 properties and districts listed on the National Register in the county, including 21 National Historic Landmarks. Pasadena is the location of 130 of these properties and districts, including five National Historic Landmarks; they are listed here. The other properties and districts elsewhere in the county, including five National Historic Landmarks, are listed separately. A single district, the Arroyo Seco Parkway Historic District, is split between Pasadena and other parts of the county.

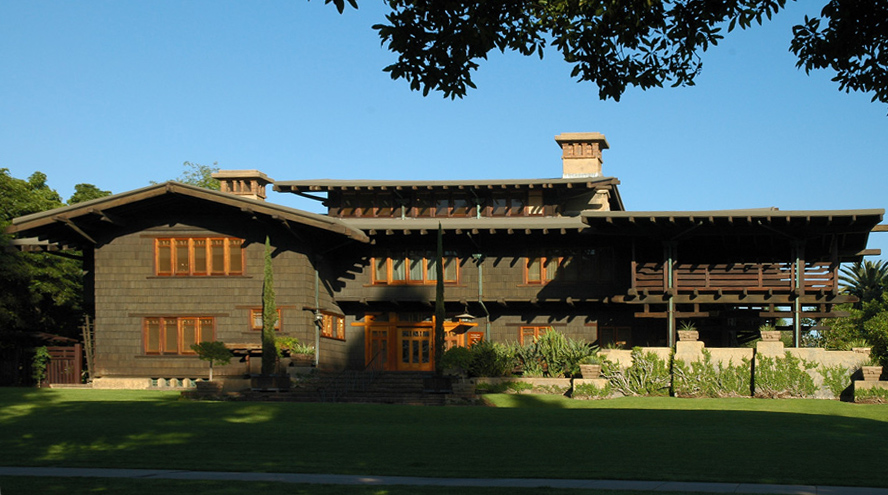
Greene and Greene's Gamble House

The first sites in Pasadena to be listed on the Register were Greene and Greene's American Craftsman masterpiece, the Gamble House (built from 1908 to 1909), the Pasadena Playhouse (built in 1924) and Frank Lloyd Wright's textile block structure, the Millard House (built in 1923). Greene and Greene also built the Robert R. Blacker House, Dr. W. T. Bolton House and Cordelia A. Culbertson House, all examples of their innovative Craftsman-style bungalow houses and larger-scale ultimate bungalows. Other architects of note who have designed buildings in Pasadena include Myron Hunt (the Rose Bowl and California Institute of Technology) and Welton Beckett (Bullock's Pasadena).

Pasadena is the home of many leading scientific and cultural institutions, including the California Institute of Technology (Caltech), the Jet Propulsion Laboratory, the Pasadena Playhouse and the Norton Simon Museum of Art. Several sites relate to Pasadena's long connection with astronomy and space exploration, including the Space Flight Operations Facility, the Twenty-Five-Foot Space Simulator, and Hale Solar Laboratory. Also, the Edwin Hubble House, home to famed astronomer Edwin Hubble, is located in the adjacent community of San Marino.

Two of Pasadena's historic bridges, the Colorado Street Bridge, built in 1913 and known for its distinctive Beaux Arts arches, light standards, and railings, and the La Loma Bridge, built in 1914, are among the sites listed on the Register.

Thirty-one of Pasadena's listings are historic districts, which include multiple contributing properties. Among these historic districts is Old Town Pasadena, a thriving historic district of shops, bars and restaurants in well-preserved turn-of-the-century buildings with its center at Fair Oaks Avenue and Colorado Boulevard. Other historic districts include the Pasadena Playhouse Historic District, the Pasadena Civic Center District, the Bungalow Heaven Landmark District, the Civic Center Financial District, the Lower Arroyo Seco Historic District, the Orange Heights-Barnhart Tracts Historic District, the Park Place-Arroyo Terrace Historic District, the Prospect Historic District and the South Marengo Historic District.

This National Park Service list is complete through NPS recent listings posted October 23, 2026.

== Current listings ==
	Name on the Register	Image	Date listed	Location	Description
1	Arroyo Seco Parkway Historic District	Arroyo Seco Parkway Historic District	February 4, 2011 (#10001198)	CA 110 from Four Level Interchange in Los Angeles to East Glenarm St. in Pasadena; 34°07′39″N 118°08′50″W	Runs from Downtown Los Angeles to Pasadena
2	Kenneth Newell Avery Studio		September 5, 2024 (#100010825)	377 Arroyo Terrace; 34°09′04″N 118°09′44″W	
3	Batchelder House	Batchelder House	December 14, 1978 (#78000695)	626 S. Arroyo Blvd. 34°08′06″N 118°09′54″W	
4	Bekins Storage Co. Roof Sign	Bekins Storage Co. Roof Sign	October 15, 1997 (#97001212)	511 S. Fair Oaks Ave. 34°08′14″N 118°09′00″W	A rooftop sign, which now promotes Public Storage Co.
5	Louise C. Bentz House	Louise C. Bentz House	December 2, 1977 (#77000299)	657 Prospect Blvd. 34°09′21″N 118°09′38″W	
6	Robert R. Blacker House	Robert R. Blacker House	February 6, 1986 (#86000147)	1177 Hillcrest Ave. 34°07′37″N 118°07′58″W	
7	Edmund Blinn House	Edmund Blinn House	April 5, 2001 (#01000329)	160 N. Oakland Ave. 34°08′55″N 118°08′19″W	
8	Dr. W. T. Bolton House	Dr. W. T. Bolton House	July 9, 1980 (#80004491)	370 W. Del Mar Blvd. 34°08′26″N 118°09′27″W	
9	Bonnie Court	Bonnie Court	November 15, 1994 (#94001325)	140 S. Bonnie Ave. 34°08′35″N 118°06′52″W	
10	Bowen Court	Bowen Court	June 17, 1982 (#82002194)	539 E. Villa St. 34°09′20″N 118°08′18″W	
11	Bristol-Cypress Historic District	Bristol-Cypress Historic District	August 9, 2011 (#11000489)	438-516 Cypress Ave. 34°09′13″N 118°09′15″W	
12	Bryan Court	Bryan Court	April 16, 1986 (#86000790)	427 S. Marengo Ave. 34°08′18″N 118°08′46″W	
13	Bullock's Pasadena	Bullock's Pasadena	July 12, 1996 (#96000776)	401 S. Lake Ave. 34°08′15″N 118°07′58″W	
14	Bungalow Heaven Historic District	Bungalow Heaven Historic District	April 10, 2008 (#08000260)	Roughly bounded by N. Mentor Ave., E. Orange Grove Blvd., E. Washington Blvd., N. Michigan & N. Chester Aves. 34°09′48″N 118°07′39″W	
15	Case Study House No. 10	Case Study House No. 10	July 24, 2013 (#13000514)	711 S. San Rafael Ave. 34°07′52″N 118°10′13″W	One of the Case Study Houses. While the NPS listing for the property gives its address as in Los Angeles, its nomination form places the property in Pasadena.
16	Civic Center Financial District	Civic Center Financial District	October 29, 1982 (#82000967)	E. Colorado Blvd. and Marengo Ave. 34°08′46″N 118°08′41″W	
17	Colonial Court	Colonial Court	July 11, 1983 (#83001185)	291-301 N. Garfield Ave. 34°09′04″N 118°08′39″W	
18	Colorado Street Bridge	Colorado Street Bridge	February 12, 1981 (#81000156)	Colorado Blvd. 34°08′41″N 118°09′49″W	
19	James Fielding Cosby House	James Fielding Cosby House	August 9, 2011 (#11000490)	510 Locke Haven St. 34°08′17″N 118°09′41″W	
20	Cottage Court	Cottage Court	July 11, 1983 (#83001186)	642-654 S. Marengo Ave. 34°08′04″N 118°08′41″W	
21	Court	Court	July 11, 1983 (#83001188)	744-756½ S. Marengo Ave. 34°07′58″N 118°08′40″W	
22	Court	Court	July 11, 1983 (#83001187)	497–503½ N. Madison Ave. 34°09′17″N 118°08′15″W	
23	Court	Court	July 11, 1983 (#83001189)	732–744 Santa Barbara St. 34°09′19″N 118°08′03″W	
24	Court at 1274-1282 North Raymond Avenue	Court at 1274-1282 North Raymond Avenue	November 15, 1994 (#94001315)	1274-1282 N. Raymond Ave. 34°10′04″N 118°08′56″W	
25	Court at 275 North Chester Avenue	Court at 275 North Chester Avenue	November 15, 1994 (#94001324)	275 N. Chester Ave. 34°09′03″N 118°07′29″W	
26	Court at 533–549 North Lincoln Avenue	Court at 533–549 North Lincoln Avenue	November 15, 1994 (#94001320)	533–549 N. Lincoln Ave. 34°09′15″N 118°09′14″W	
27	Court at 638-650 North Mar Vista Avenue	Court at 638-650 North Mar Vista Avenue	November 15, 1994 (#94001319)	638-650 N. Mar Vista Ave. 34°09′26″N 118°07′35″W	
28	Court at 940-948 North Raymond Avenue	Court at 940-948 North Raymond Avenue	November 15, 1994 (#94001317)	940-948 N. Raymond Ave. 34°09′43″N 118°08′55″W	
29	Cordelia A. Culbertson House	Cordelia A. Culbertson House	September 12, 1985 (#85002198)	1188 Hillcrest Ave. 34°07′40″N 118°07′56″W	
30	Cypress Court	Cypress Court	July 11, 1983 (#83001190)	623-641 N. Madison Ave. 34°09′25″N 118°08′16″W	
31	Mary E. Denham House	Mary E. Denham House	August 9, 2011 (#11000491)	297 S. Orange Grove Blvd. 34°08′26″N 118°09′35″W	
32	Don Carlos Court	Don Carlos Court	July 11, 1983 (#83001191)	374-386 S. Marengo Ave. 34°08′23″N 118°08′40″W	
33	Euclid Court	Euclid Court	July 11, 1983 (#83001193)	545 S. Euclid Ave. 34°08′11″N 118°08′32″W	
34	Evanston Inn	Evanston Inn	September 13, 1984 (#84000787)	385-395 S. Marengo Ave. 34°08′19″N 118°08′43″W	
35	Fenyes Estate	Fenyes Estate	September 5, 1985 (#85001983)	470 W. Walnut St. & 160 N. Orange Grove Blvd. 34°08′56″N 118°09′37″W	
36	First Trust Building and Garage	First Trust Building and Garage	June 12, 1987 (#87000941)	587-611 E. Colorado Blvd. and 30-44 N. Madison Ave. 34°08′46″N 118°08′17″W	
37	Foothill Boulevard Milestone (Mile 11)	Foothill Boulevard Milestone (Mile 11)	April 19, 1996 (#96000421)	South side of E. Colorado Blvd., west of the junction with Holliston Ave. 34°08′45″N 118°07′23″W	
38	Ford Place Historic District	Ford Place Historic District	July 22, 2010 (#10000496)	110-175 N. Oakland Ave.; 450-465 Ford Place; 144 N. Los Robles Ave. 34°08′55″N 118°08′26″W	
39	Richard and Mary Alice Frank House	Richard and Mary Alice Frank House	April 10, 2009 (#09000175)	919 La Loma Road; 34°08′05″N 118°10′10″W	
40	Rose Graham and James Allen Freeman House	Rose Graham and James Allen Freeman House	September 15, 2011 (#11000654)	1330 Hillcrest Ave. 34°07′28″N 118°07′53″W	
41	Friendship Baptist Church	Friendship Baptist Church	November 20, 1978 (#78000696)	80 W. Dayton St. 34°08′36″N 118°09′04″W	
42	Gamble House	Gamble House	September 3, 1971 (#71000155)	4 Westmoreland Pl. 34°09′05″N 118°09′36″W	
43	Gartz Court	Gartz Court	August 25, 1983 (#83001195)	745 N. Pasadena Ave. 34°09′26″N 118°09′36″W	
44	Merwyn C. Gill House	Merwyn C. Gill House	December 23, 2009 (#09000176)	1385 El Mirador Dr. 34°09′56″N 118°10′44″W	
45	Hale Solar Laboratory	Hale Solar Laboratory	January 23, 1986 (#86000103)	740 Holladay Rd. 34°07′59″N 118°07′14″W	
46	Harnetiaux Court	Harnetiaux Court	November 15, 1994 (#94001321)	48 N. Catalina Ave. 34°08′49″N 118°07′45″W	
47	John S. Hartwell House	John S. Hartwell House	August 9, 2011 (#11000492)	423 Lincoln Ave. 34°09′09″N 118°09′10″W	
48	Haskett Court	Haskett Court	February 25, 1982 (#82002195)	824-834 E. California Blvd. 34°08′09″N 118°07′56″W	
49	Hermitage	Hermitage	April 5, 2001 (#01000328)	2121 Monte Vista St. 34°09′20″N 118°06′25″W	
50	Hillmont	Hillmont	August 9, 2011 (#11000493)	1375 E. Mountain St. 34°09′43″N 118°07′19″W	
51	Holly Street Livery Stable	Holly Street Livery Stable	October 25, 1979 (#79000491)	110 E. Holly St; 34°08′49″N 118°08′51″W	
52	Home Laundry	Home Laundry	June 18, 1987 (#87000980)	432 S. Arroyo Pkwy. 34°08′18″N 118°08′49″W	
53	Mrs. J.H. Hood House	Mrs. J.H. Hood House	August 9, 2011 (#11000494)	494 Ellis St. 34°08′27″N 118°09′39″W	
54	Hotel Green	Hotel Green	March 23, 1982 (#82002196)	99 S. Raymond Ave. 34°08′39″N 118°08′55″W	
55	House at 1011 S. Madison Ave.	House at 1011 S. Madison Ave.	August 6, 1998 (#98000959)	1011 S. Madison Ave. 34°07′43″N 118°08′19″W	
56	House at 1015 Prospect Boulevard	House at 1015 Prospect Boulevard	August 20, 2004 (#04000322)	1015 Prospect Blvd. 34°09′37″N 118°09′46″W	
57	House at 1050 S. Madison Ave.	House at 1050 S. Madison Ave.	August 6, 1998 (#98000960)	1050 S. Madison Ave. 34°07′40″N 118°08′17″W	
58	House at 1111 North Los Robles Avenue	House at 1111 North Los Robles Avenue	December 3, 2013 (#13000868)	1111 N. Los Robles Ave. 34°09′54″N 118°08′31″W	
59	House at 1121 North Los Robles Avenue	House at 1121 North Los Robles Avenue	December 3, 2013 (#13000869)	1121-1123 N. Los Robles Ave. 34°09′55″N 118°08′31″W	
60	House at 1141 North Chester Avenue	House at 1141 North Chester Avenue	August 20, 2004 (#04000326)	1141 N. Chester Ave. 34°09′57″N 118°07′29″W	
61	House at 1233 Wentworth Ave.	House at 1233 Wentworth Ave.	August 6, 1998 (#98000962)	1233 Wentworth Ave. 34°07′32″N 118°08′03″W	
62	House at 1240 North Los Robles	House at 1240 North Los Robles	August 20, 2004 (#04000329)	1240 N. Los Robles Ave. 34°10′02″N 118°08′29″W	
63	House at 1360 Lida Street	House at 1360 Lida Street	August 9, 2011 (#11000495)	1360 Lida St. 34°10′17″N 118°10′46″W	
64	House at 1487 Loma Vista Street	House at 1487 Loma Vista Street	August 20, 2004 (#04000323)	1487 Loma Vista St. 34°09′38″N 118°07′11″W	
65	House at 380 W. Del Mar Blvd.	House at 380 W. Del Mar Blvd.	August 6, 1998 (#98000961)	380 W. Del Mar Blvd. 34°08′26″N 118°09′30″W	
66	House at 530 S. Marengo Avenue	House at 530 S. Marengo Avenue	September 13, 1979 (#79000492)	530 S. Marengo Ave. 34°08′12″N 118°08′44″W	
67	House at 574 Bellefontaine St.	House at 574 Bellefontaine St.	August 6, 1998 (#98000958)	574 Bellefontaine St. 34°07′53″N 118°09′45″W	
68	House at 674 Elliot Drive	House at 674 Elliot Drive	August 20, 2004 (#04000325)	674 Elliot Dr. 34°07′31″N 118°08′10″W	
69	Howard Motor Company Building	Howard Motor Company Building	April 18, 1996 (#96000422)	1285 E. Colorado Blvd. 34°08′47″N 118°07′26″W	
70	Benjamin Jarvis House	Benjamin Jarvis House	August 9, 2011 (#11000496)	531 N. Raymond Ave. 34°09′18″N 118°08′58″W	
71	Kindel Building	Kindel Building	April 18, 1996 (#96000423)	1095 E. Colorado Blvd. 34°08′47″N 118°07′40″W	
72	Kosy Knook Court	Kosy Knook Court	November 15, 1994 (#94001322)	830 Brooks Ave. 34°09′35″N 118°09′19″W	
73	La Loma Bridge	La Loma Bridge	July 14, 2004 (#04000680)	Crossing the Arroyo Seco at La Loma Road; 34°08′03″N 118°10′01″W	
74	Friend Lacey House	Friend Lacey House	August 9, 2011 (#11000497)	679 E. Villa St. 34°09′16″N 118°08′11″W	
75	Las Casitas Court	Las Casitas Court	July 11, 1983 (#83001196)	656 N. Summit Ave. 34°09′26″N 118°08′51″W	
76	Longfellow-Hastings House	Longfellow-Hastings House	March 2, 1982 (#82002197)	85 S. Allen Ave. 34°08′40″N 118°06′45″W	
77	Lower Arroyo Seco Historic District	Lower Arroyo Seco Historic District	July 12, 2005 (#04000331)	Roughly Arroyo Blvd., W. California Blvd., La Loma Blvd. 34°08′06″N 118°09′59″W	
78	Theodore Parker Lukens House	Theodore Parker Lukens House	March 29, 1984 (#84000879)	267 N. El Molino Ave. 34°09′02″N 118°08′15″W	
79	W. Parker Lyon House	W. Parker Lyon House	April 23, 2020 (#100005212)	280 California Terrace; 34°08′28″N 118°09′51″W	
80	Marengo Gardens	Marengo Gardens	July 11, 1983 (#83001197)	982, 986, 990 S. Marengo Ave. and 221-241 Ohio St. 34°07′58″N 118°08′40″W	
81	Marguerita Lane Historic District	Marguerita Lane Historic District	April 10, 2009 (#09000177)	Marguerita Lane off South Marengo Avenue; 34°07′26″N 118°08′41″W	
82	Markham Place Historic District	Markham Place Historic District	March 27, 2013 (#13000106)	Roughly bounded by California St., Pasadena Ave., Bellefontaine St. & Orange Grove Blvd. 34°08′02″N 118°09′22″W	
83	Mary Louise Court	Mary Louise Court	November 15, 1994 (#94001318)	583-599 N. Mentor Ave. 34°09′22″N 118°07′53″W	
84	Clarence and Mary Mello House	Clarence and Mary Mello House	April 10, 2009 (#09000178)	541 Fremont Dr. 34°09′16″N 118°09′45″W	
85	Mentor Court	Mentor Court	November 15, 1994 (#94001323)	937 E. California Blvd. 34°08′10″N 118°07′49″W	
86	Samuel Merrill House	Samuel Merrill House	April 5, 2001 (#01000330)	1285 N. Summit Ave. 34°10′05″N 118°08′53″W	
87	Merwin House	Merwin House	January 14, 2013 (#12001164)	267 W. State St. 34°07′34″N 118°09′21″W	
88	Millard House	Millard House	December 12, 1976 (#76000493)	645 Prospect Crescent; 34°09′19″N 118°09′39″W	Textile block house designed by Frank Lloyd Wright
89	Miss Orton's Classical School for Girls (Dormitory)	Miss Orton's Classical School for Girls (Dormitory)	August 4, 1995 (#95000998)	154 S. Euclid Ave. 34°08′36″N 118°08′33″W	
90	Mission Court	Mission Court	July 11, 1983 (#83001198)	567 N. Oakland Ave. 34°09′21″N 118°08′22″W	
91	New Fair Oaks Historic District	New Fair Oaks Historic District	August 9, 2011 (#11000498)	480-512 Lincoln Av. & 57-103 W. Villa St. 34°09′13″N 118°09′11″W	
92	Newcomb House	Newcomb House	September 2, 1982 (#82002198)	675-677 N. El Molino Ave. 34°09′27″N 118°08′10″W	
93	Grace Nicholson Building	Grace Nicholson Building	July 21, 1977 (#77000300)	46 N. Los Robles Ave. 34°08′47″N 118°08′25″W	Home of Pacific Asia Museum
94	John Norton House	John Norton House	April 10, 2009 (#09000179)	820 Burleigh Dr. 34°07′46″N 118°10′24″W	
95	Odd Fellows Temple	Odd Fellows Temple	August 1, 1985 (#85001682)	120 N. El Molino Ave., Pasadena, California; 34°08′53″N 118°08′12″W	Odd Fellows building, moved after NRHP listing from 175 N. Los Robles Ave.
96	Old Pasadena Historic District	Old Pasadena Historic District	September 15, 1983 (#83001200)	Roughly bounded by Pasadena, Fair Oaks, Raymond Aves., Arroyo Pkwy., Del Mar Blvd., and Corson St. 34°08′45″N 118°09′00″W	Boundary increase and decrease (listed March 25, 2008): Fair Oaks & Raymond Aves., Colorado Blvd., Green St.
97	Orange Grove Court	Orange Grove Court	July 11, 1983 (#83001199)	745 E. Orange Grove Blvd. 34°09′28″N 118°08′03″W	
98	Orange Heights-Barnhart Tracts Historic District	Orange Heights-Barnhart Tracts Historic District	September 29, 1995 (#95001128)	Roughly bounded by N. Los Robles Ave. W, N. El Molino Ave. E., Jackson St. N., and E. Mountain St. S. 34°09′47″N 118°08′18″W	
99	Palmetto Court	Palmetto Court	July 11, 1983 (#83001201)	100 Palmetto Dr. 34°08′14″N 118°09′09″W	
100	Park Place-Arroyo Terrace Historic District	Park Place-Arroyo Terrace Historic District	June 29, 2007 (#04000324)	368-440 Arroyo Terrace, 200-240 N. Grand Ave., 201-239 N. Orange Grove Blvd. 34°08′58″N 118°09′44″W	
101	Pasadena Arroyo Parks and Recreation District	Pasadena Arroyo Parks and Recreation District	November 11, 2008 (#08000579)	Roughly bounded by the Foothill Freeway on the north, the city limits on the south, Arroyo Blvd on east, San Rafael Ave on the west 34°09′17″N 118°10′02″W	
102	Pasadena Avenue Historic District		August 10, 2021 (#100006821)	Roughly bounded by South Pasadena Ave., Arlington Dr., Avoca Ave., Columbia St., West Glenarm St., Hurlbut St., Madeline Dr., West State St. and Wigmore Dr. 34°07′33″N 118°09′16″W	
103	Pasadena Civic Center District	Pasadena Civic Center District	July 28, 1980 (#80000813)	Roughly bounded by Walnut and Green Sts., Raymond and Euclid Aves. 34°08′48″N 118°08′40″W	
104	Pasadena Field Archery Range		November 20, 2020 (#100005799)	415 South Arroyo Blvd. 34°08′25″N 118°09′59″W	
105	Pasadena Playhouse	Pasadena Playhouse	November 11, 1975 (#75000435)	39 S. El Molino Ave. 34°08′42″N 118°08′11″W	
106	Pasadena Playhouse Historic District	Pasadena Playhouse Historic District	May 19, 1994 (#94000462)	464-611 E. Colorado Blvd., 550-655 E. Green St., 21-127 S. El Molino Ave., and 150 N.-101 S. Madison Ave.. 34°08′43″N 118°08′19″W	
107	Pegfair Estates Historic District	Pegfair Estates Historic District	January 18, 2010 (#09001223)	1525-1645 Pegfair Estates Dr.; 1335-1345 Carnarvon Dr. 34°10′19″N 118°11′03″W	
108	Robert and Barbara Pike House	Robert and Barbara Pike House	April 10, 2009 (#09000181)	512 Glen Ct. 34°09′14″N 118°10′31″W	
109	Poppy Peak Historic District	Poppy Peak Historic District	December 23, 2009 (#09000182)	Bounded by Ave. 64 on the east, La Loma Rd. on the north including Poppy Peak Dr., Kaweah Dr. and Cresthaven Dr. 34°07′53″N 118°10′52″W	
110	George B. Post House	George B. Post House	August 9, 2011 (#11000499)	360 S. Grand Ave. 34°08′21″N 118°09′41″W	
111	Prospect Historic District	Prospect Historic District	April 7, 1983 (#83001202)	Prospect Blvd., Prospect Square, Prospect Crescent and Prospect Terrace, Rosemont Ave., Armada and Fremont Drs., and La Mesa Pl. 34°09′29″N 118°09′42″W	
112	Raymond-Summit Historic District	Raymond-Summit Historic District	August 9, 2011 (#11000500)	Roughly bounded by N. Raymond Ave., E. Villa St., Summit Ave. & E. Maple St. 34°09′12″N 118°08′54″W	
113	The Rose Bowl	The Rose Bowl	February 27, 1987 (#87000755)	991 Rosemont Ave., Brookside Park; 34°09′41″N 118°10′00″W	
114	Rose Court	Rose Court	July 11, 1983 (#83001203)	449-457 S. Hudson Ave. 34°08′15″N 118°07′59″W	
115	Royal Laundry Complex	Royal Laundry Complex	September 27, 2007 (#07000996)	443 S. Raymond Ave. 34°08′16″N 118°08′59″W	
116	Sara-Thel Court	Sara-Thel Court	July 11, 1983 (#83001192)	618-630 S. Marengo Ave. 34°08′06″N 118°08′41″W	
117	Singer Building	Singer Building	May 16, 1985 (#85001066)	16 S. Oakland Ave. and 520 E. Colorado Blvd. 34°08′44″N 118°08′22″W	
118	Ernest W. Smith House	Ernest W. Smith House	January 14, 1988 (#87002397)	272 S. Los Robles Ave. 34°08′28″N 118°08′27″W	
119	Southern California Sanitarium Historic District	Southern California Sanitarium Historic District	April 17, 2013 (#13000160)	2900 E. Del Mar Blvd. 34°08′30″N 118°05′28″W	
120	South Marengo Historic District	South Marengo Historic District	June 2, 1982 (#82002199)	S. Marengo Ave. 34°08′12″N 118°08′42″W	
121	Space Flight Operations Facility	Space Flight Operations Facility	October 3, 1985 (#85002814)	Jet Propulsion Laboratory; 34°12′04″N 118°10′25″W	
122	Storrier-Stearns Japanese Garden	Storrier-Stearns Japanese Garden	February 15, 2005 (#05000050)	270 Arlington Dr. 34°07′41″N 118°09′21″W	
123	Stoutenburgh House	Stoutenburgh House	November 25, 1980 (#80000814)	255 S. Marengo Ave. 34°08′28″N 118°08′42″W	
124	Stuart Company Plant and Office Building	Stuart Company Plant and Office Building	October 20, 1998 (#94001326)	3360 E. Foothill Blvd. 34°08′57″N 118°04′49″W	Currently a condominium
125	Toad Hall		December 4, 2023 (#100009582)	353 Anita Drive; 34°08′05″N 118°10′41″W	
126	Twenty-Five-Foot Space Simulator	Twenty-Five-Foot Space Simulator	October 3, 1985 (#85002812)	Jet Propulsion Laboratory; 34°12′10″N 118°10′22″W	
127	Villa Verde	Villa Verde	September 13, 1984 (#84000896)	800 S. San Rafael; 34°07′52″N 118°10′06″W	
128	Vista del Arroyo Hotel and Bungalows	Vista del Arroyo Hotel and Bungalows	April 2, 1981 (#81000157)	125 S. Grand Ave. 34°08′38″N 118°09′43″W	Currently the Richard H. Chambers Courthouse, U.S. Court of Appeals for the 9th Circuit
129	Henry A. Ware House	Henry A. Ware House	June 15, 2004 (#04000015)	460 Bellefontaine St. 34°07′53″N 118°09′36″W	
130	Washington Court	Washington Court	November 15, 1994 (#94001316)	475 E. Washington Blvd. 34°10′09″N 118°08′27″W	

== Former listings ==
	Name on the Register	Image	Date listed	Date removed	Location	City or town	Description
1	Neighborhood Church		April 10, 1974 (#74002272)	August 14, 1974	Pasadena Ave. and California Blvd.		Demolished July 27, 1974 for construction of Interstate 710.
2	Pasadena Athletic and Country Club		November 11, 1977 (#77001545)	1978	SE corner of E. Green St. and S. Los Robles Ave.		Demolished in 1977 for construction of the Plaza Pasadena shopping mall, which was demolished in 2000.

== See also ==
- List of National Historic Landmarks in California
- National Register of Historic Places listings in California
- California Historical Landmarks in Los Angeles County, California
