= Stoutenburg (disambiguation) =

Stoutenburg is a village in the Netherlands.

Stoutenburg or Stoutenburgh may also refer to:

== People ==
- Adrien Stoutenburg (1916-1982), American poet
- Isaac Stoutenburgh (1739–1799), New York politician

== Other ==
- Stoutenburgh House, historic house in Pasadena, California
- Bergh–Stoutenburgh House, historic house in Hyde Park, New York
- William Stoutenburgh House, historic house in Hyde Park, New York
