= Bryan Court =

- U.S. National Register of Historic Places
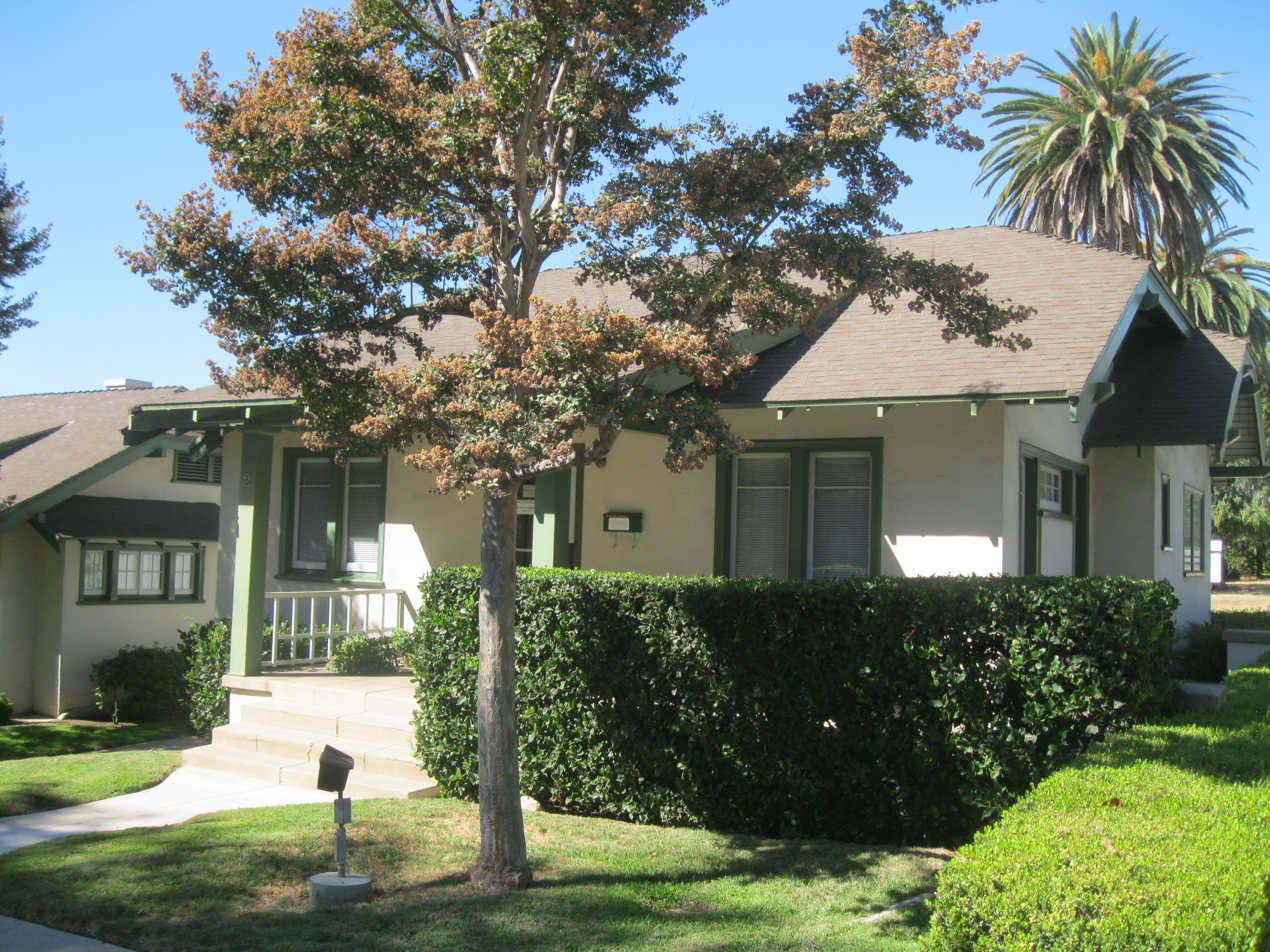
- One of the homes in Bryan Court

- Location within the Los Angeles metropolitan area Location within California Location within the United States
- Location: 427 S. Marengo Ave., Pasadena, California
- Coordinates: 34°8′18″N 118°8′46″W
- Built: 1916
- NRHP reference No.: 86000790
- Added to NRHP: 1986

Bryan Court is a bungalow court located at 427 S. Marengo Ave. in Pasadena, California. The court includes seven Craftsman-style homes surrounding a central courtyard. The stucco houses are designed to resemble English cottages and have porches and jerkinhead roofs. D. M. Renton built the court in 1916.

The court was listed on the National Register of Historic Places in 1986.

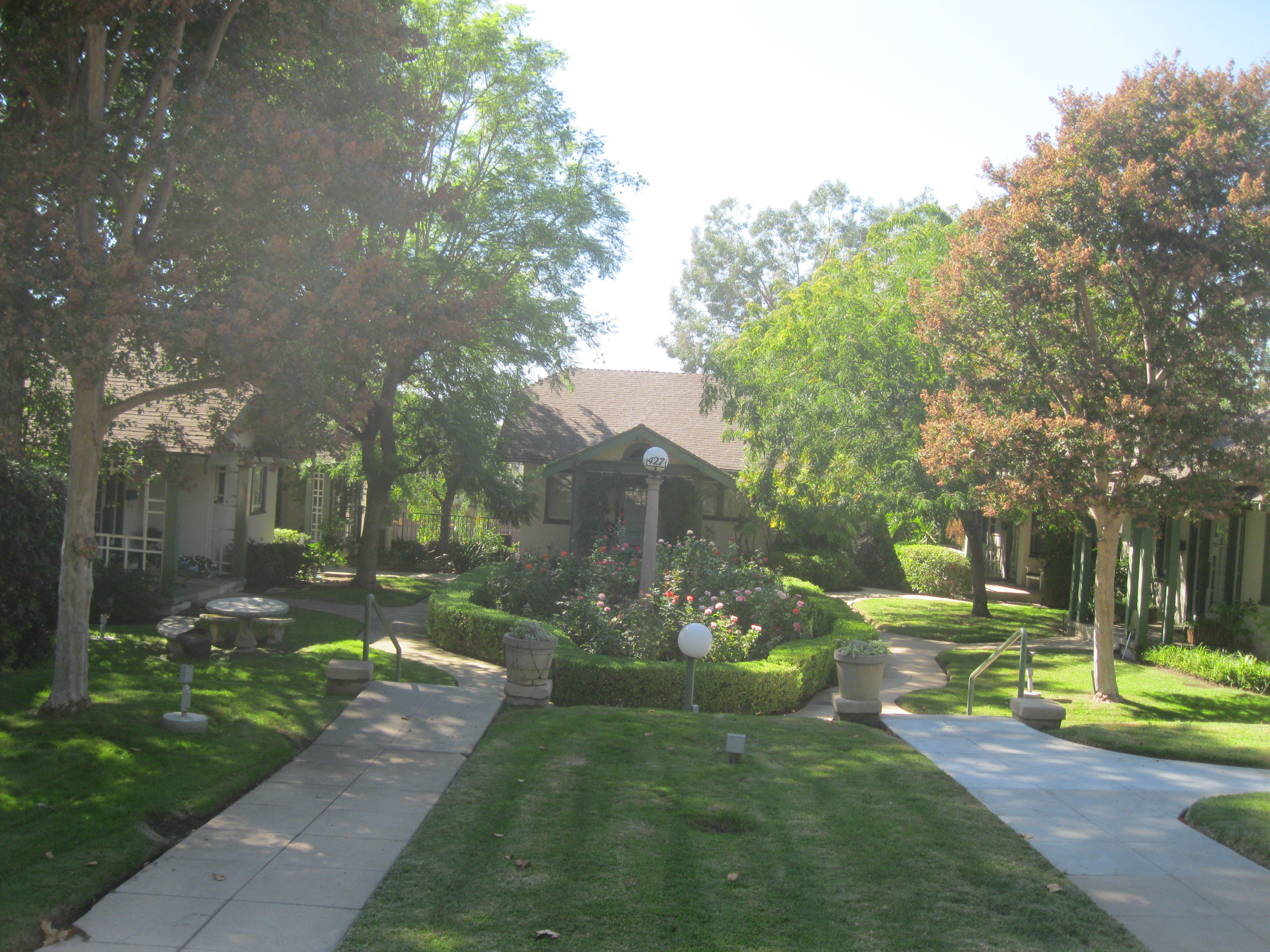
The courtyard in Bryan Court

== See also ==
- National Register of Historic Places listings in Pasadena, California
