= Bonnie Court =

- U.S. National Register of Historic Places
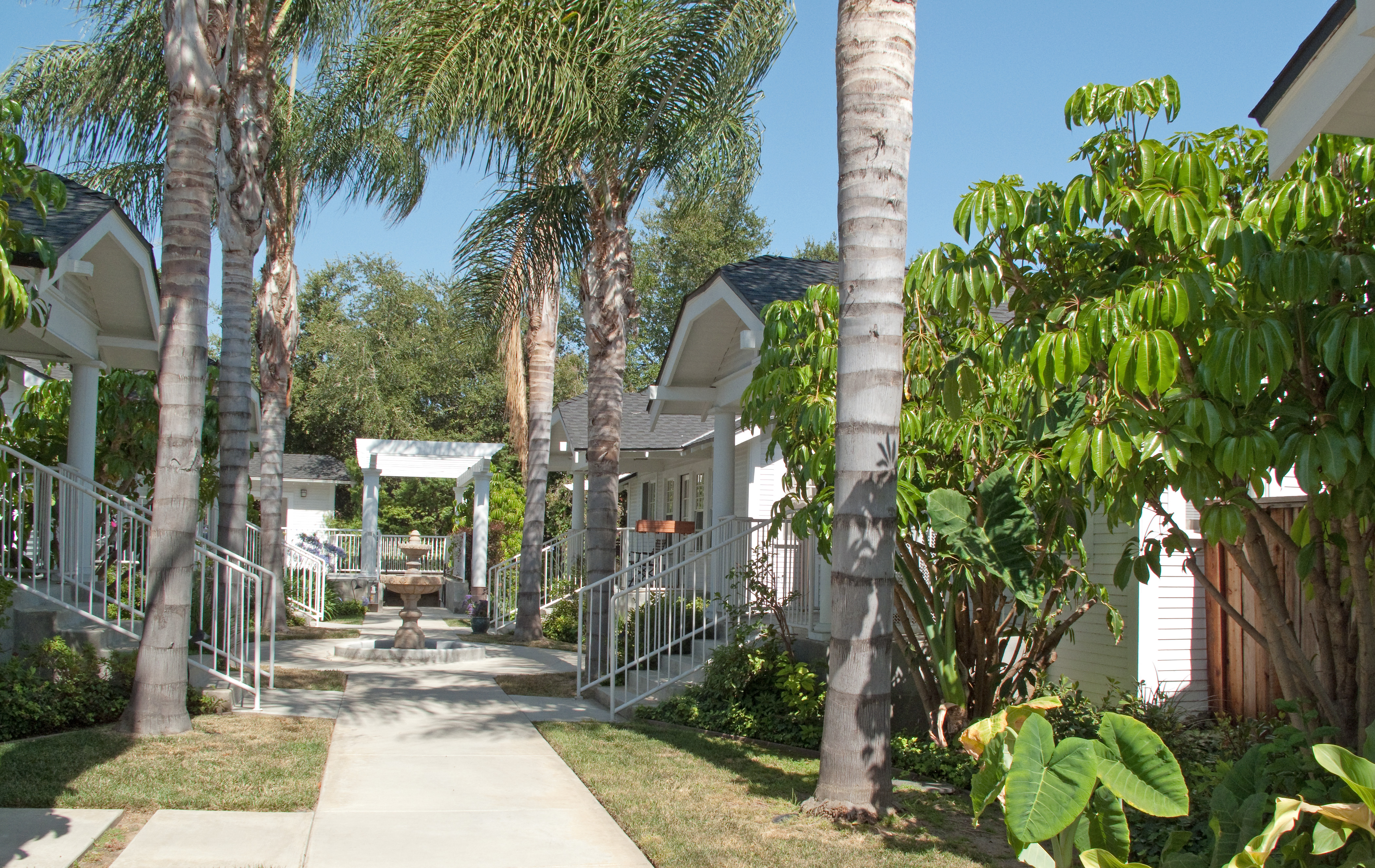

- Location within the Los Angeles metropolitan area Location within California Location within the United States
- Location: 140 S. Bonnie Ave., Pasadena, California
- Coordinates: 34°8′36″N 118°6′56″W
- NRHP reference No.: 94001325
- Added to NRHP: November 15, 1994

Bonnie Court is a bungalow court located at 140 S. Bonnie Ave. in Pasadena, California. The court consists of six identical homes arranged around a central path. The court was built from 1922 to 1924, during a building boom for bungalow courts. The houses within the court were designed in the Colonial Revival style, a popular design for small homes; the design can be seen in the homes' entrance porticos with supporting columns and their jerkinhead roofs. The court is representative of the detached narrow, or open, form of bungalow courts.

The court was listed on the National Register of Historic Places on November 15, 1994.

== See also ==
- National Register of Historic Places listings in Pasadena, California
