= Colonial Court =

- U.S. National Register of Historic Places
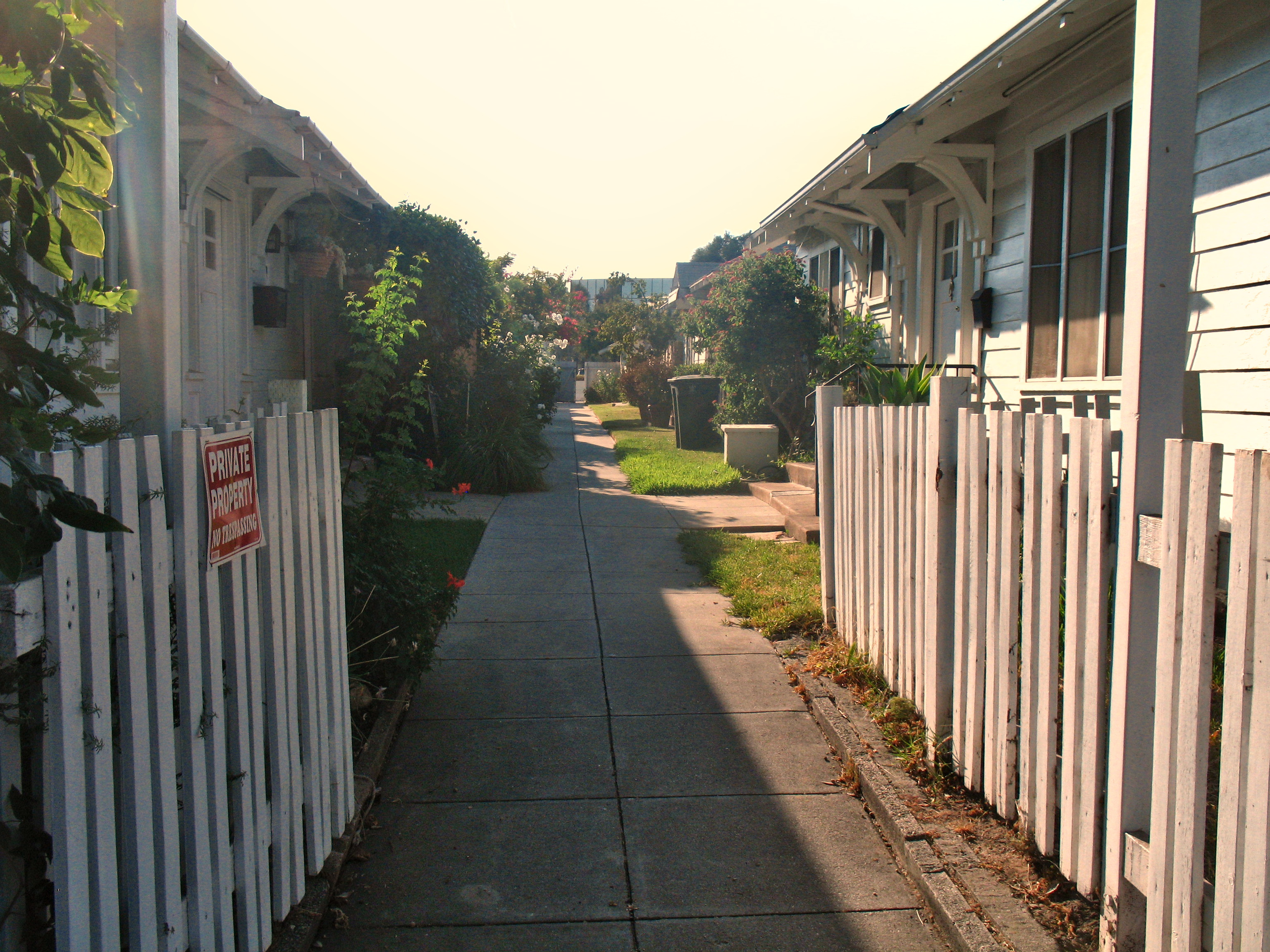

- Location within the Los Angeles metropolitan area Location within California Location within the United States
- Location: 291-301 N. Garfield Ave., Pasadena, California
- Coordinates: 34°9′4″N 118°8′39″W
- Area: 0.2 acres (0.081 ha)
- Built: 1916
- Architect: Bennett, Cyril
- Architectural style: Colonial Revival, Bungalow/craftsman
- MPS: Bungalow Courts of Pasadena TR
- NRHP reference No.: 83001185
- Added to NRHP: July 11, 1983

Colonial Court is a bungalow court located at 291–301 N. Garfield Ave. in Pasadena, California. The court consists of six houses arranged around a narrow courtyard. The houses are designed in the Colonial Revival style and feature clapboard siding and jerkinhead roofs. Built in 1916, the homes were designed by architect Cyril Bennett.

The court was added to the National Register of Historic Places on July 11, 1983.
