= Henry A. Ware House =

Historic house in California, United States

- U.S. National Register of Historic Places
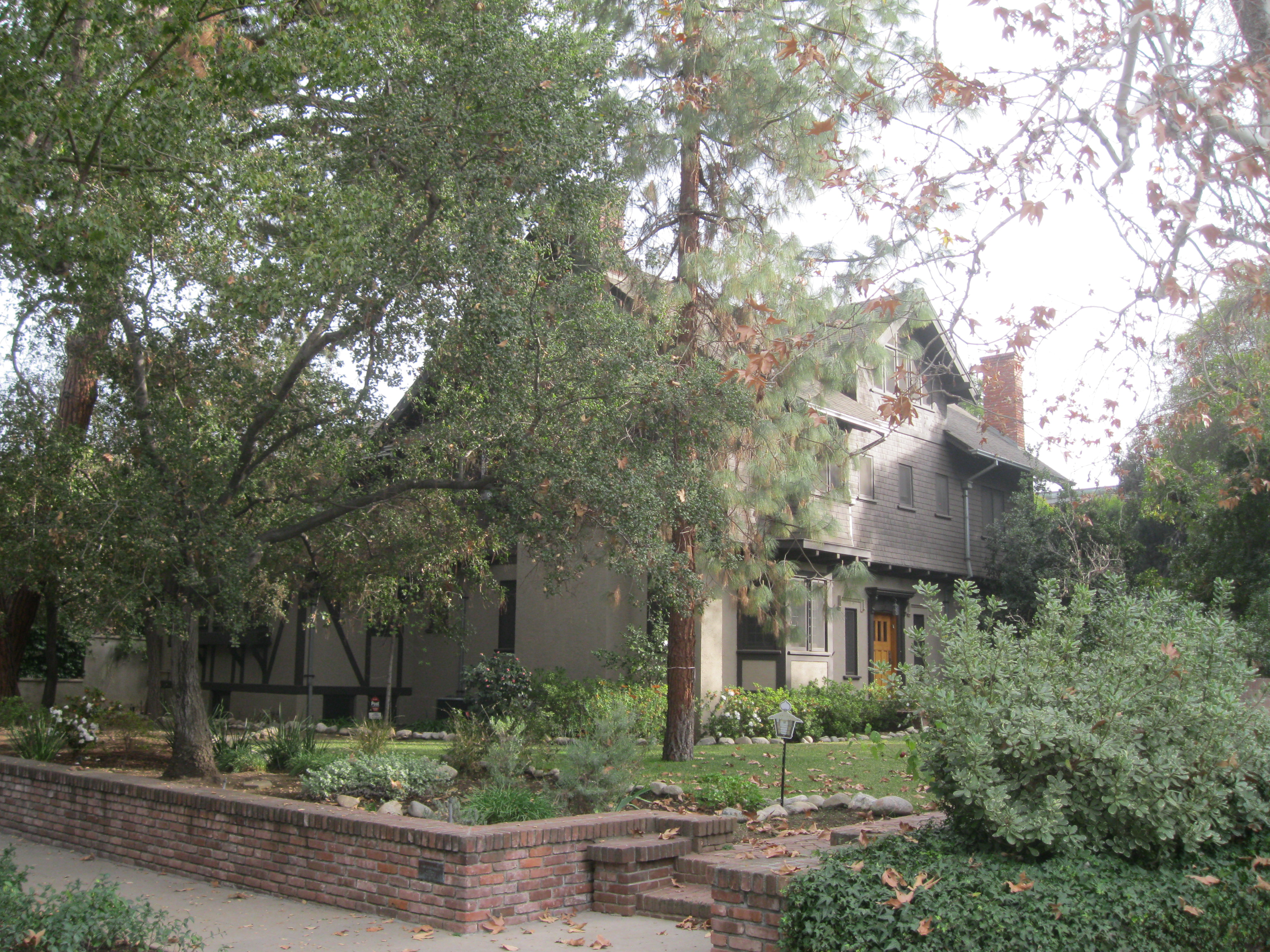

- Location within the Los Angeles metropolitan area Location within California Location within the United States
- Location: 460 Bellefontaine St., Pasadena, California
- Coordinates: 34°7′53″N 118°9′36″W
- Area: 0.5 acres (0.20 ha)
- Built: 1913
- Architect: Greene & Greene
- Architectural style: American Craftsman
- MPS: Residential Architecture of Pasadena: Influence of the Arts and Crafts Movement MPS
- NRHP reference No.: 04000015
- Added to NRHP: June 15, 2004

The Henry A. Ware House is a historic house located at 460 Bellefontaine Street in Pasadena, California. Prominent Pasadena architectural firm Greene & Greene designed the American Craftsman style house, which was built in 1913. The house's roof has a complex gabled form typical of Craftsman designs, and its eaves are overhanging with exposed rafters and beams. A large front-facing gable features a stepped brick chimney, while a one-story bay includes Tudor-inspired half-timbering.

The house was added to the National Register of Historic Places on June 15, 2004.
