= House at 1050 S. Madison Ave. =

Historic house in California, United States

- U.S. National Register of Historic Places
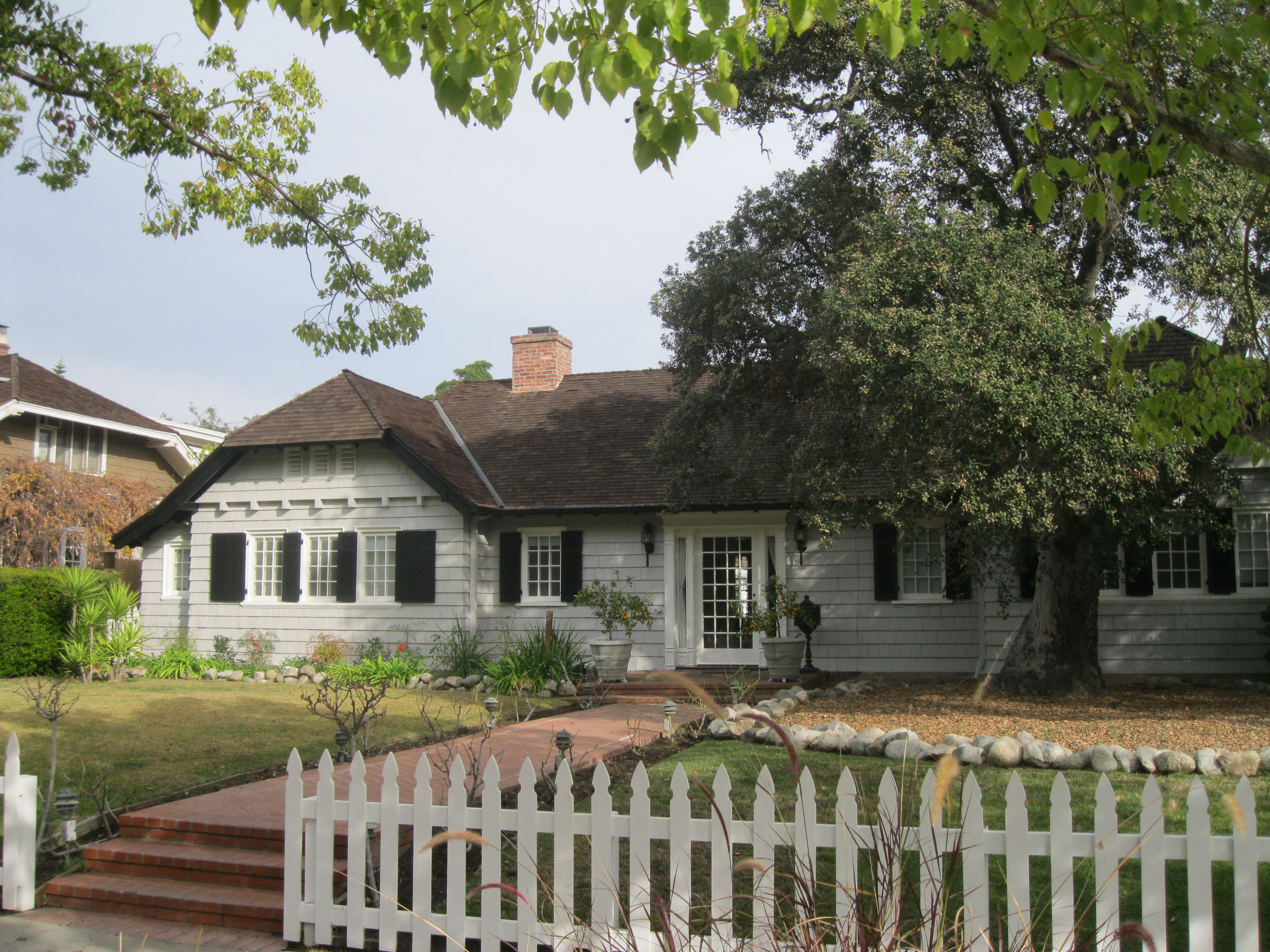

- Location within the Los Angeles metropolitan area Location within California Location within the United States
- Location: 1050 S. Madison Ave., Pasadena, California
- Coordinates: 34°7′40″N 118°8′17″W
- Area: less than one acre
- Built: 1911
- Architect: Johnson, Reginald D.
- Architectural style: Colonial Revival
- MPS: Residential Architecture of Pasadena: Influence of the Arts and Crafts Movement
- NRHP reference No.: 98000960
- Added to NRHP: August 6, 1998

The House at 1050 S. Madison Ave. is a historic house located at 1050 South Madison Avenue in Pasadena, California. Architect Reginald D. Johnson designed the Colonial Revival house for himself in 1911. The one-story house has a U-shaped plan surrounding a brick terrace in the rear. The house's hipped roof features jerkinhead ends at either side of the front facade; the front door and windows are arranged symmetrically between the two ends. Both the roof and the exterior walls are covered with shingles.

The house was added to the National Register of Historic Places on August 6, 1998.
