= Cypress Court =

- U.S. National Register of Historic Places
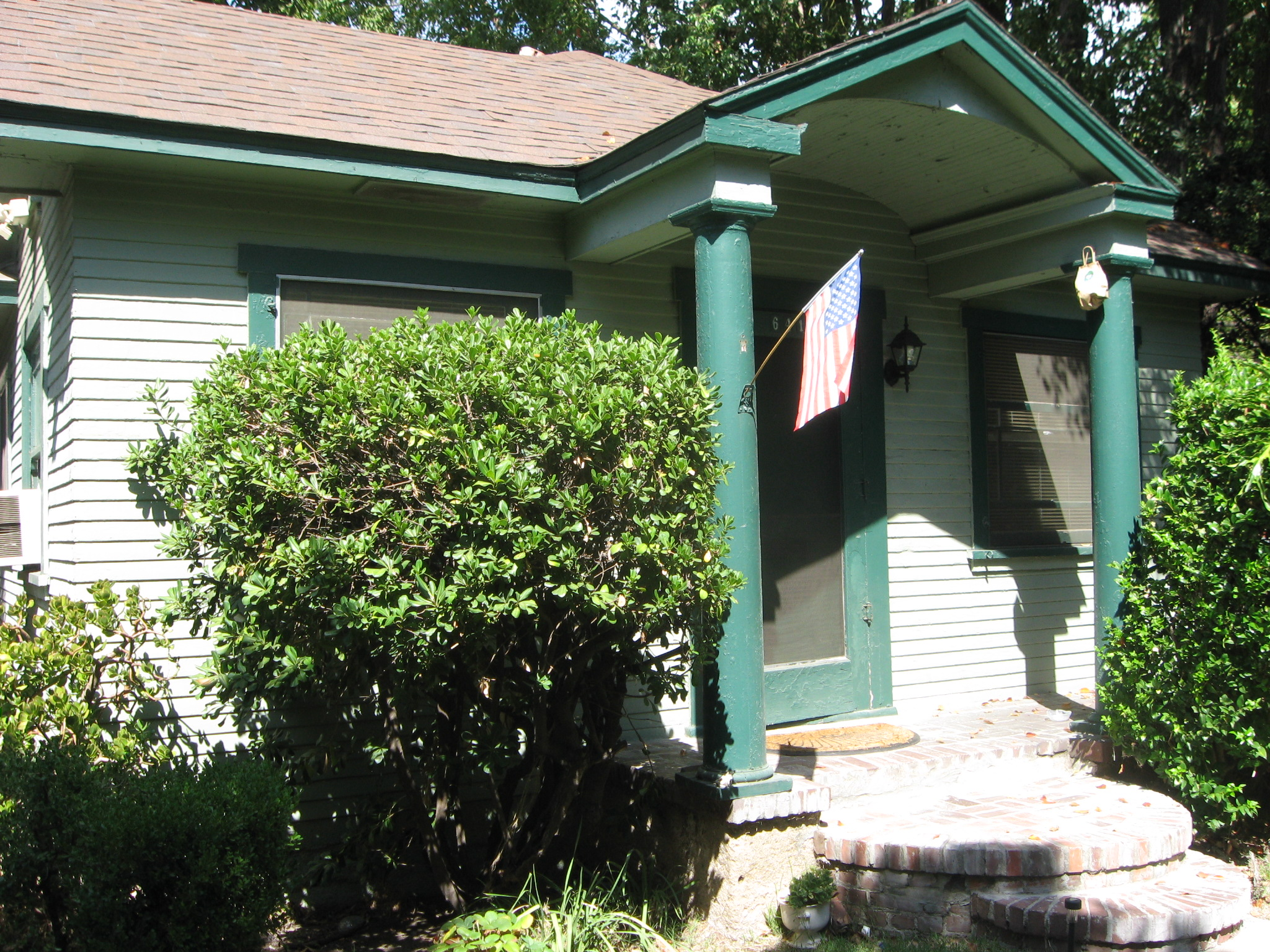

- Location within the Los Angeles metropolitan area Location within California Location within the United States
- Location: 623-641 N. Madison Ave., Pasadena, California
- Coordinates: 34°9′25″N 118°8′16″W
- Area: 0.5 acres (0.20 ha)
- Built: 1928
- Built by: Gehrig, Arthur G.
- Architectural style: Colonial Revival
- MPS: Bungalow Courts of Pasadena TR
- NRHP reference No.: 83001190
- Added to NRHP: July 11, 1983

Cypress Court is a bungalow court located at 623–641 N. Madison Ave. in Pasadena, California. The court consists of eight houses surrounding two central walkways. The homes are designed in the Colonial Revival style and feature gable roofs and gabled porches supported by columns. Contractor Arthur G. Gehrig built the court in 1928.

The court was added to the National Register of Historic Places on July 11, 1983.
