= House at 1487 Loma Vista Street =

Historic house in California, United States

- U.S. National Register of Historic Places
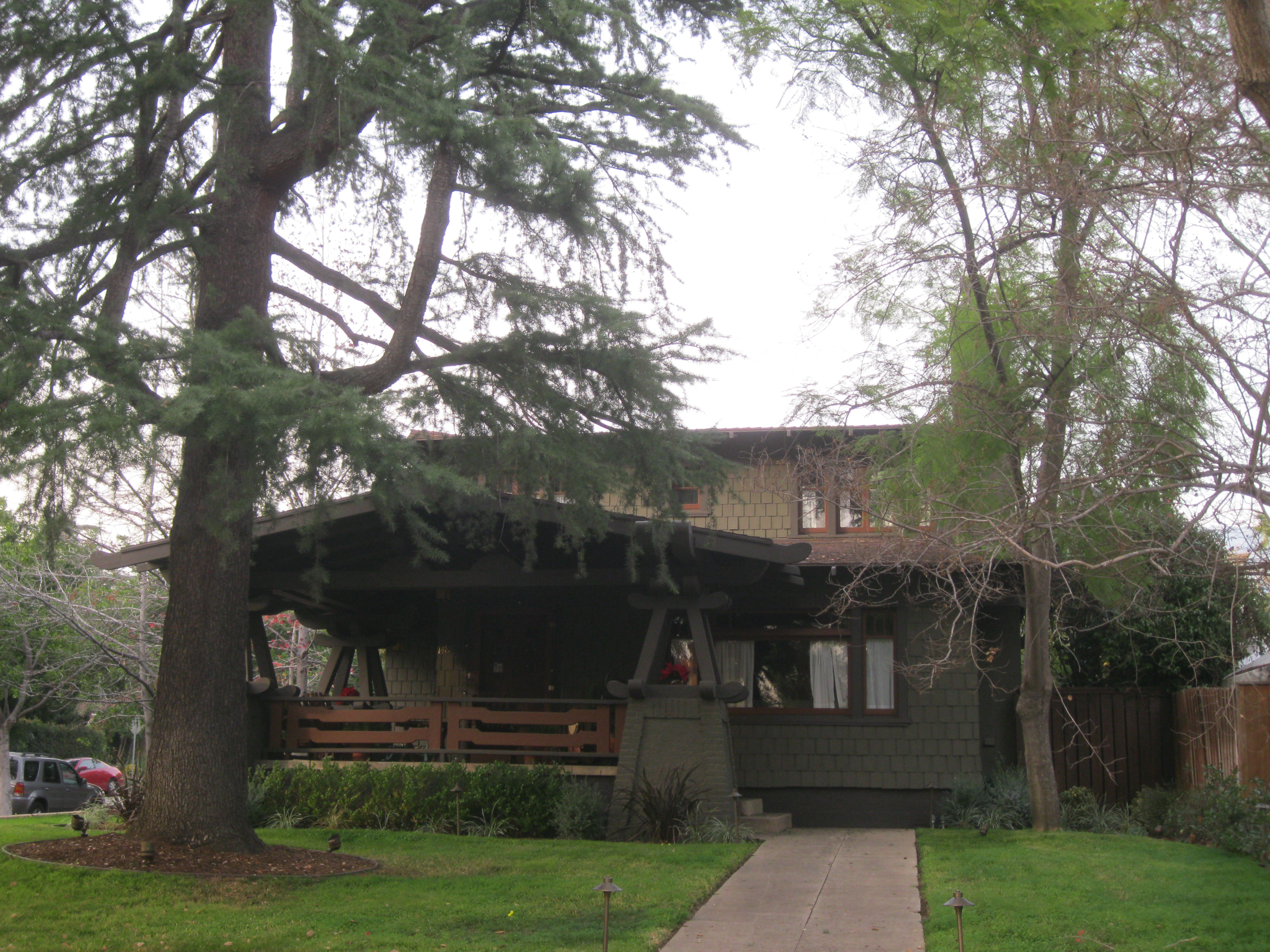

- Location within the Los Angeles metropolitan area Location within California Location within the United States
- Location: 1487 Loma Vista St., Pasadena, California
- Coordinates: 34°9′38″N 118°7′11″W
- Area: less than one acre
- Built: 1913
- Architectural style: American Craftsman
- MPS: Residential Architecture of Pasadena: Influence of the Arts and Crafts Movement MPS
- NRHP reference No.: 04000323
- Added to NRHP: August 20, 2004

The House at 1487 Loma Vista Street is a historic house located at 1487 Loma Vista Street in Pasadena, California. The American Craftsman house was built in 1913 in the city's Pasadena Heights neighborhood. A gable with paired brackets covers the front porch and part of the first story; the gable is supported by three concrete piers topped by decorative lumber uprights. The sides and rear of the house each have gables at both the first and second stories. All of the gables in the house have exaggerated peaks inspired by Asian architecture, wide eaves, and exposed rafter tails. The property includes a similarly designed garage, which also has an exaggerated gable peak and is considered a contributing building.

The house was added to the National Register of Historic Places on August 20, 2004.
