= House at 1011 S. Madison Ave. =

Historic house in California, United States

- U.S. National Register of Historic Places
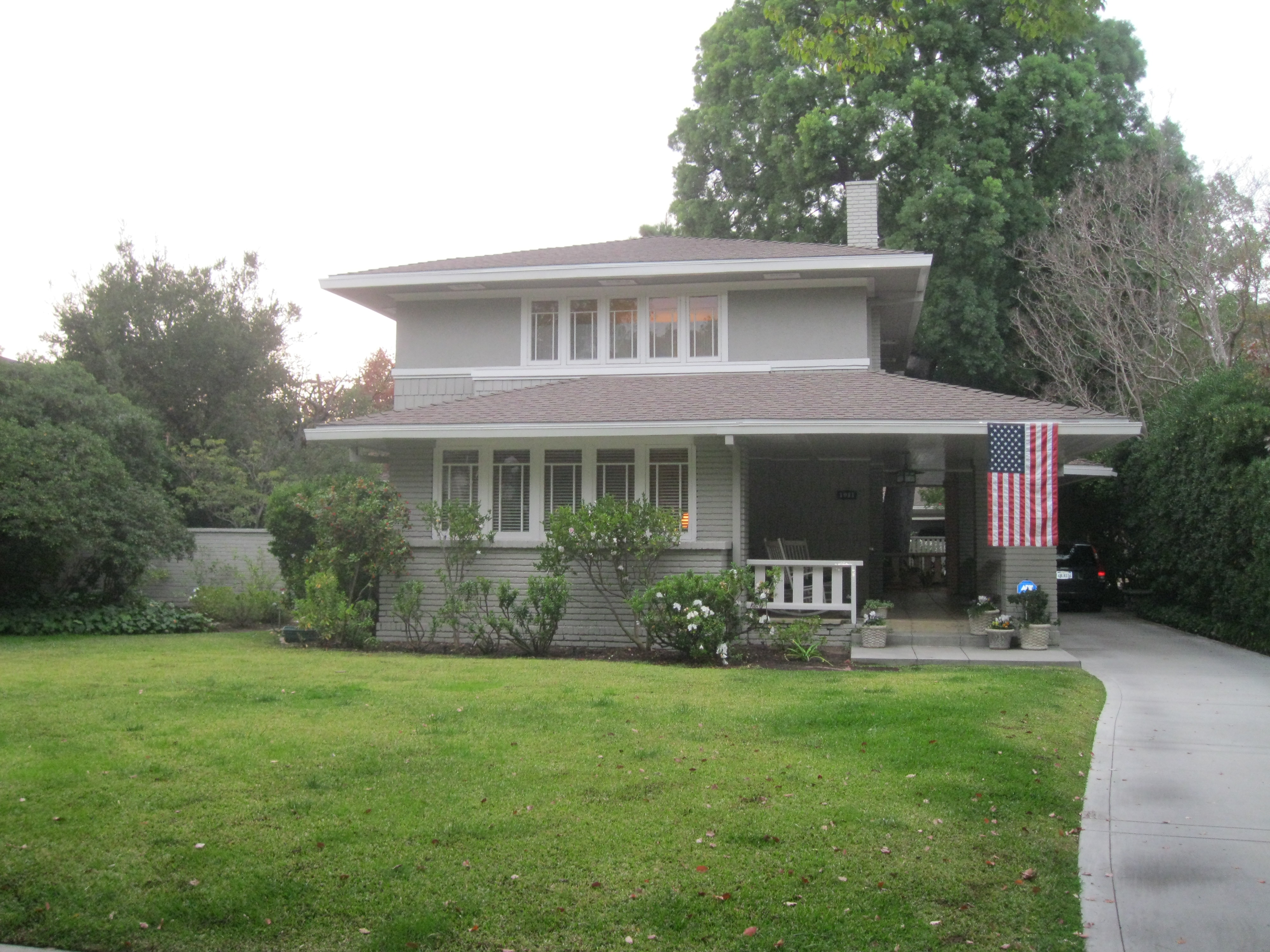

- Location within the Los Angeles metropolitan area Location within California Location within the United States
- Location: 1011 S. Madison Ave., Pasadena, California
- Coordinates: 34°7′43″N 118°8′19″W
- Area: less than one acre
- Built: 1911
- Architect: Marston, Sylvanus B.
- Architectural style: Prairie School
- MPS: Residential Architecture of Pasadena: Influence of the Arts and Crafts Movement
- NRHP reference No.: 98000959
- Added to NRHP: August 6, 1998

The House at 1011 S. Madison Ave. is a historic house located at 1011 South Madison Avenue in Pasadena, California. Architect Sylvanus B. Marston of Marston, Van Pelt & Maybury designed the Prairie School style house, which was built in 1911. The two-story house has a square box plan inspired by a 1907 Frank Lloyd Wright design called "A Fireproof House for $50,000". The house has a horizontal emphasis characteristic of the Prairie School and a low hipped roof. A side porch is located on the north side of the house, which originally also had a front porch that has since been enclosed. Rows of casement windows on the front of each story feature a decorative pattern with three vertical panes and a transom.

The house was added to the National Register of Historic Places on August 6, 1998.
