= Civic Center Financial District =

- U.S. National Register of Historic Places
- U.S. Historic district
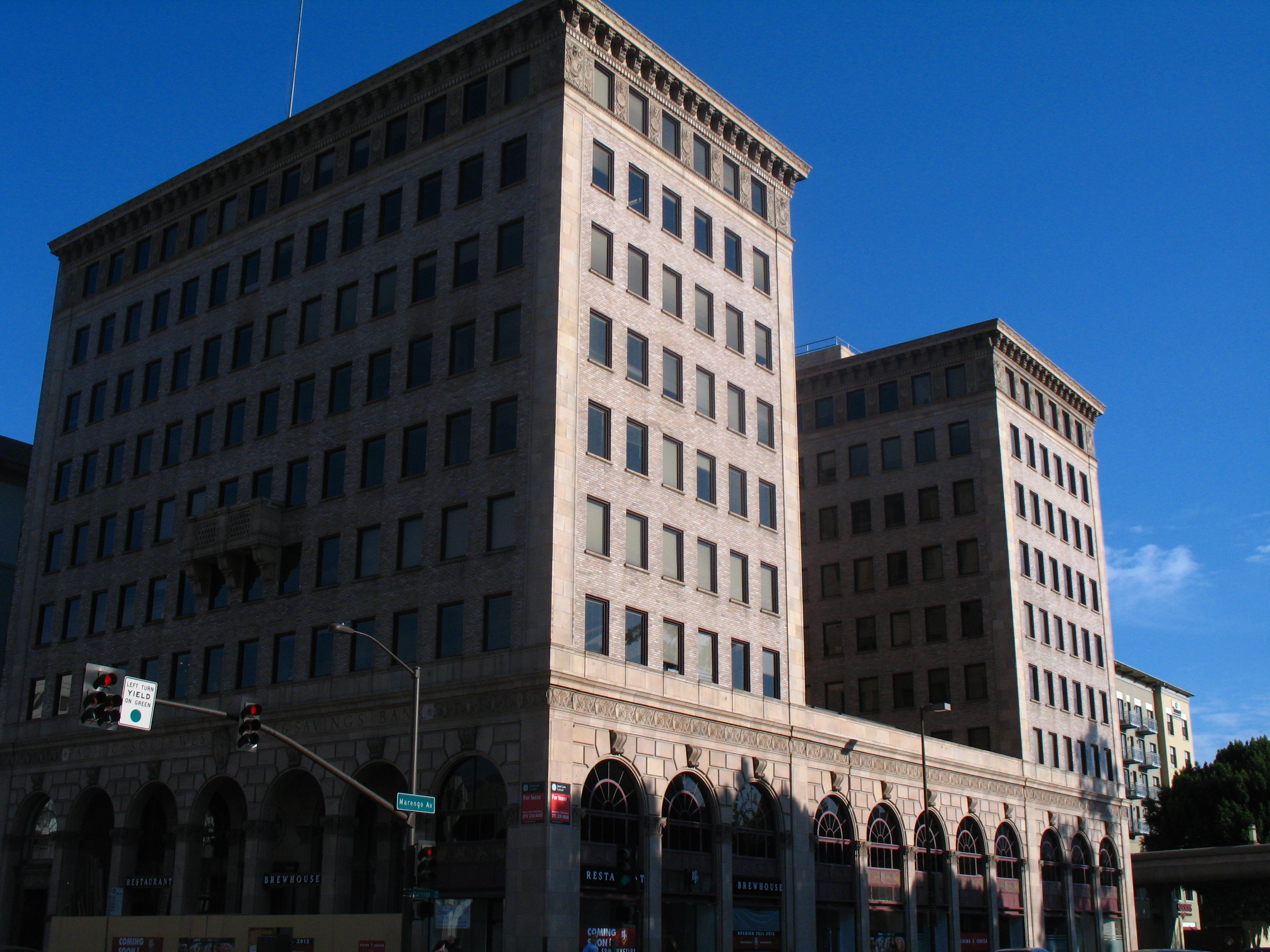
- The Security Pacific Building

- Location within the Los Angeles metropolitan area Location within California Location within the United States
- Location: E. Colorado Blvd. and Marengo Ave., Pasadena, California
- Coordinates: 34°8′46″N 118°8′41″W
- Area: 1.2 acres (0.49 ha)
- Built: 1928
- NRHP reference No.: 82000967
- Added to NRHP: October 29, 1982

The Civic Center Financial District is a historic district composed of five buildings near the intersection of Colorado Boulevard and Marengo Avenue in Pasadena, California. The Security Pacific Building and the Citizens Bank Building are located at the intersection itself and considered the centerpieces of the district, while the MacArthur, Mutual, and Crown Buildings are located on North Marengo. The buildings, which were built between 1905 and 1928, are all architecturally significant buildings used by financial institutions in the early 20th century.

The Security Pacific Building, built in 1924, is an eight-story Second Renaissance Revival building. The building features an arcade loggia at its entrance and a terra cotta first-floor facade imitating pink granite.

The Citizens Bank Building, built in 1914, is a seven-story Neoclassical building. The building's design includes a terra cotta facade on its first floor, Doric pilasters at the entrance and between the first-floor windows, a bracketed cornice, and a metal clock facing the intersection of Colorado and Marengo.

The MacArthur Building, built in 1926, is a two-story brick building with a terra cotta front facade. The building's doorway has a two-story Ionic column on each side, and the front corners feature Doric pilasters.

The Mutual Building, built from 1905 to 1909, is a two-story brick building. The first floor was faced in wood and stucco after the building's construction. The building's wooden double doors feature oval panes of glass. The Mutual Building and the Crown Building are connected by a wooden deck.

The Crown Building, built in 1907, is a two-story brick building. The building's terra cotta facade was added in 1928. The second story of the building has a Beaux-Arts design with pilasters separating the windows, a cornice above the first floor and below the roof, and a parapet roof.

The five buildings were added to the National Register of Historic Places on October 29, 1982.
