= House at 1015 Prospect Boulevard =

Historic house in California, United States

- U.S. National Register of Historic Places
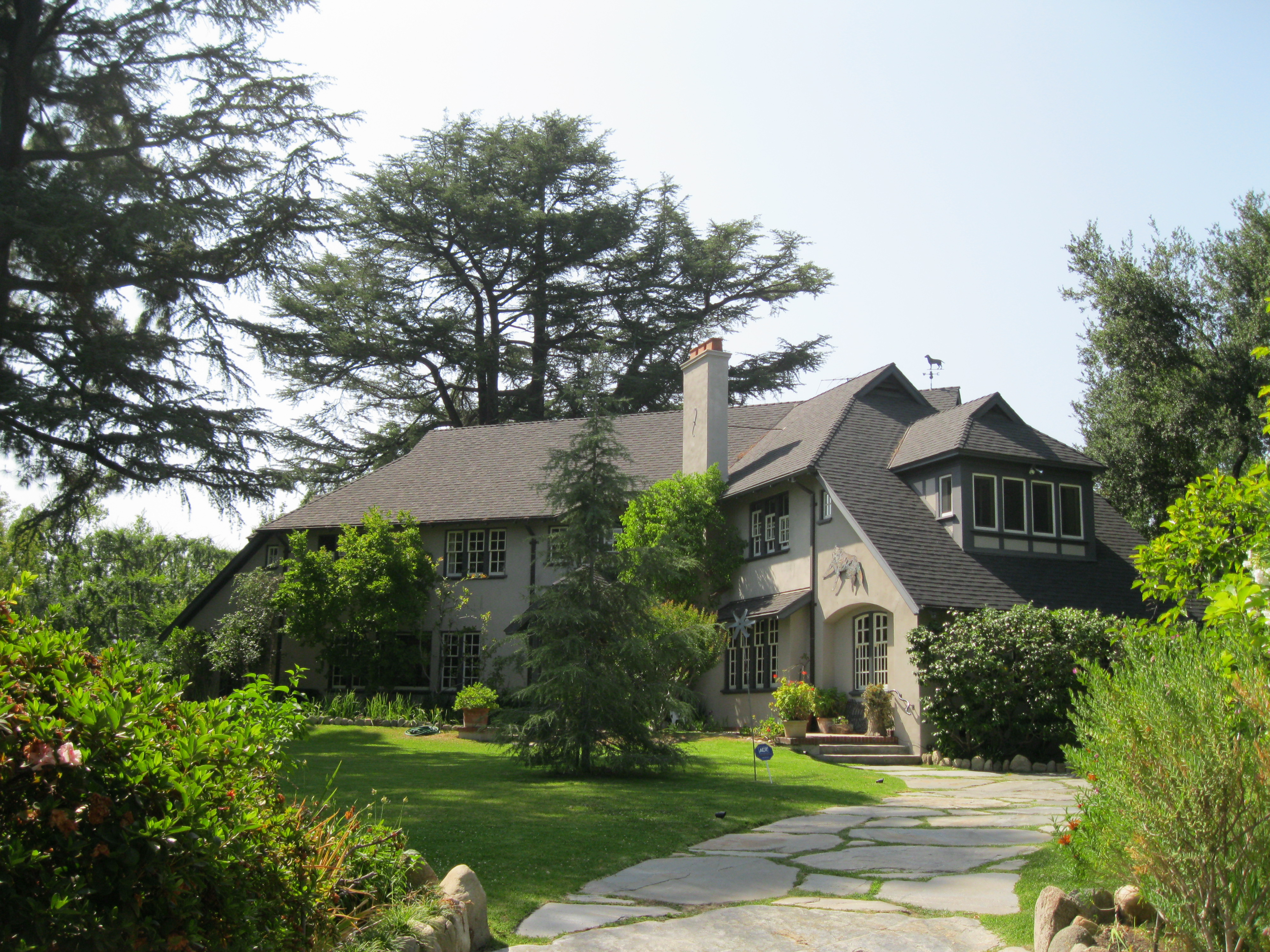

- Location within the Los Angeles metropolitan area Location within California Location within the United States
- Location: 1015 Prospect Blvd., Pasadena, California
- Coordinates: 34°9′37″N 118°9′46″W
- Area: less than one acre
- Built: 1913
- Architect: Marston, Sylvanus
- Architectural style: Arts and Crafts
- MPS: Residential Architecture of Pasadena: Influence of the Arts and Crafts Movement MPS
- NRHP reference No.: 04000322
- Added to NRHP: August 20, 2004

The House at 1015 Prospect Boulevard is a historic house located at 1015 Prospect Boulevard in Pasadena, California. Built in 1913, the house was likely the first built in Pasadena's Arroyo Park Tract. Architect Sylvanus Marston designed the English-inspired Arts and Crafts house. The two-story house has a stucco exterior with several sets of wood-frame, double-hung windows. A gabled portico with Tudor half-timbered ornamentation covers the front entrance. The multi-component roof has a gable-on-hip main section with a cross gable-on-hip section over the east side; two stucco chimney stacks rise from the roof.

The house was added to the National Register of Historic Places on August 20, 2004. It is also part of the Prospect Historic District, which had previously been listed on the National Register.
