= Court at 940–948 North Raymond Avenue =

- Court at 940-948 North Raymond Avenue
- U.S. National Register of Historic Places
- U.S. Historic district
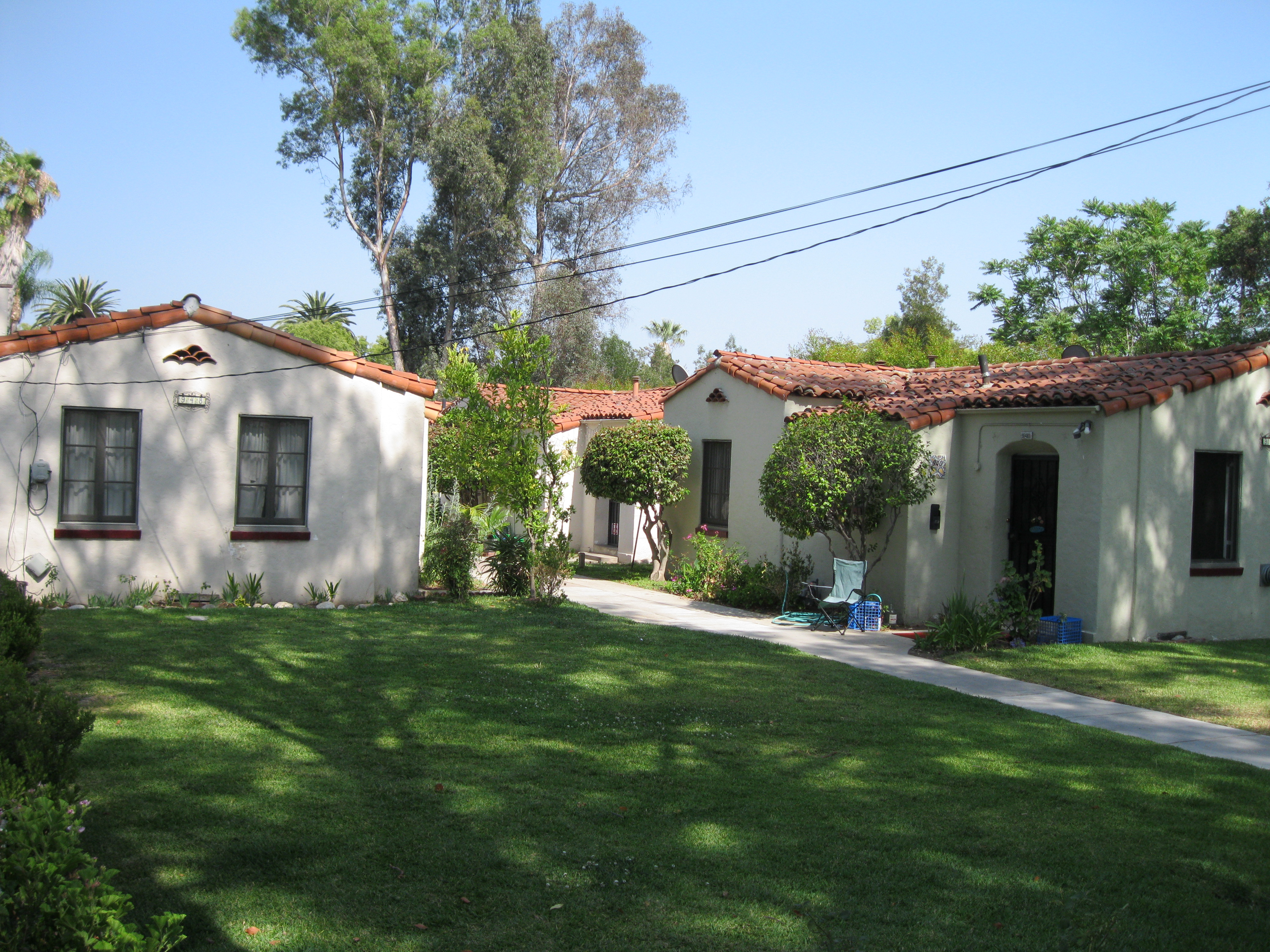

- Location within the Los Angeles metropolitan area Location within California Location within the United States
- Location: 940-948 N. Raymond Ave., Pasadena, California
- Coordinates: 34°9′43″N 118°8′55″W
- Area: less than one acre
- Built: 1929
- Architect: Bungus, N. S.
- Architectural style: Spanish Colonial Revival
- MPS: Bungalow Courts of Pasadena TR
- NRHP reference No.: 94001317
- Added to NRHP: November 15, 1994

The Court at 940-948 North Raymond Avenue is a bungalow court located at 940-948 North Raymond Avenue in Pasadena, California.

Owner H. R. Pompeyon built the court in 1929.

The court consists of five homes arranged on both sides of a narrow courtyard. Architect N. S. Bungus designed the houses in the Spanish Colonial Revival style. The homes feature stucco walls, clay tile roofs, arched entrances, wrought iron light fixtures, and ceramic tilework.

The court was added to the National Register of Historic Places on November 15, 1994.
