= Rose Court =

- U.S. National Register of Historic Places
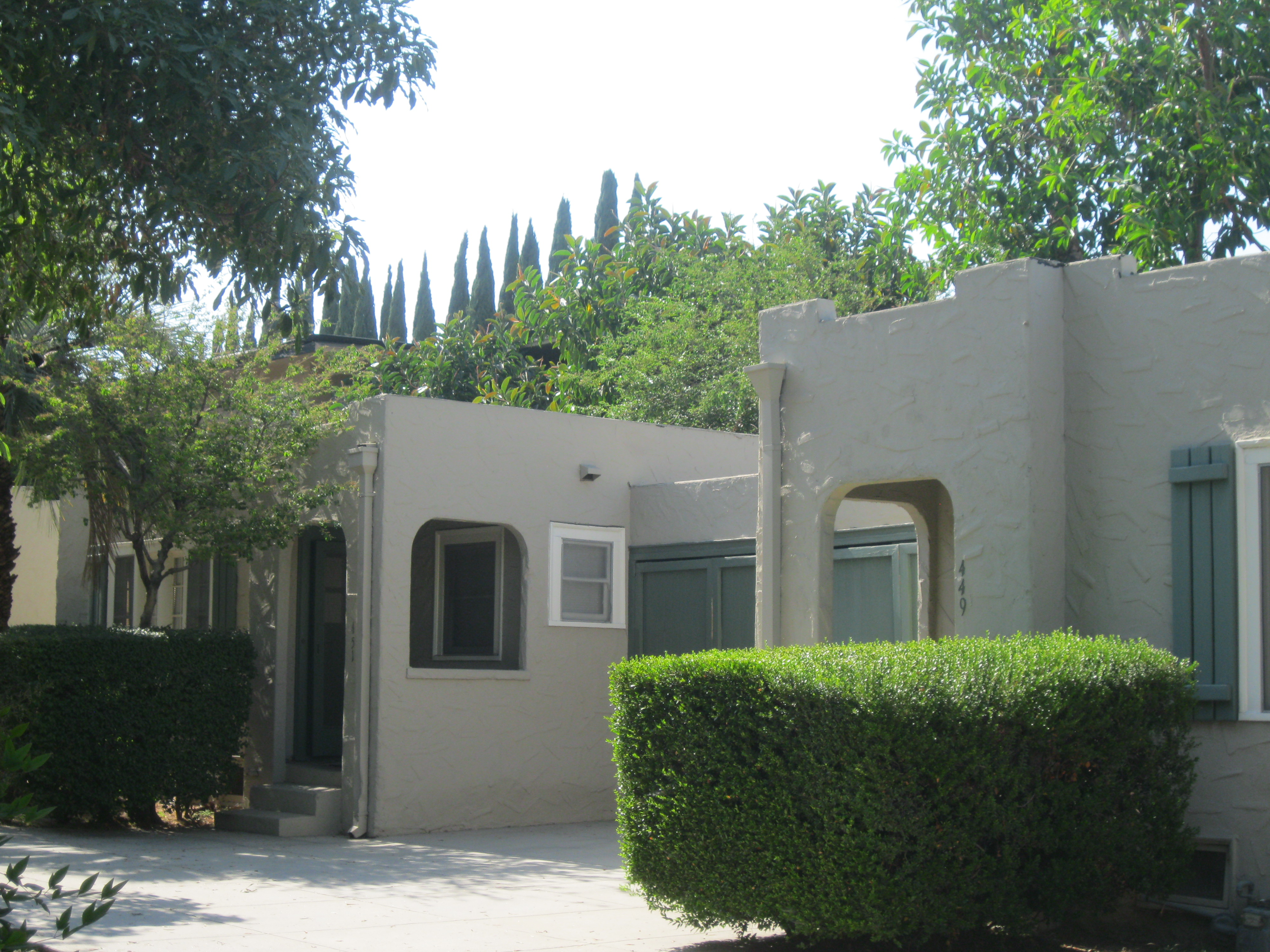

- Location within the Los Angeles metropolitan area Location within California Location within the United States
- Location: 449-457 S. Hudson Ave., Pasadena, California
- Coordinates: 34°8′15″N 118°7′59″W
- Area: 0.3 acres (0.12 ha)
- Built: 1921–22
- Architect: Stewart, Young & Stewart
- Architectural style: Mission Revival
- MPS: Bungalow Courts of Pasadena TR
- NRHP reference No.: 83001203
- Added to NRHP: July 11, 1983

Rose Court is a bungalow court located at 449-457 S. Hudson Ave. in Pasadena, California. The court has a half-court arrangement with three buildings containing five residential units located alongside a driveway. Built from 1921 to 1922, the court was designed by the architectural firm Stewart, Young & Stewart in the Mission Revival style. The homes feature stucco walls, arched porches, and broken parapets along the roof and reflect a simplified interpretation of Mission Revival architecture.

The court was added to the National Register of Historic Places on July 11, 1983.

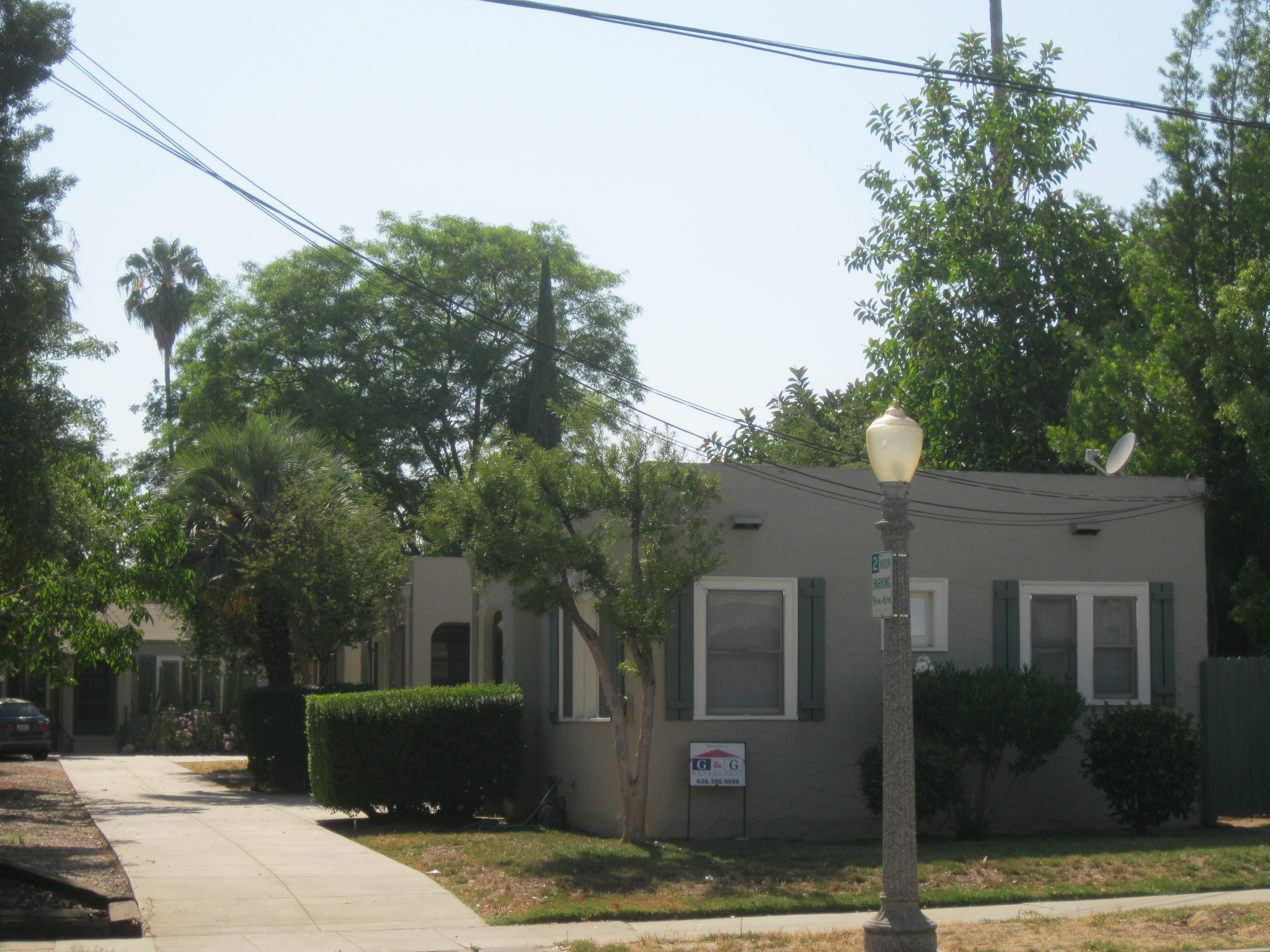
A wider view of the court
