= W. L. Mead House =

Historic house in California, United States

- House at 380 W. Del Mar Blvd.
- U.S. National Register of Historic Places
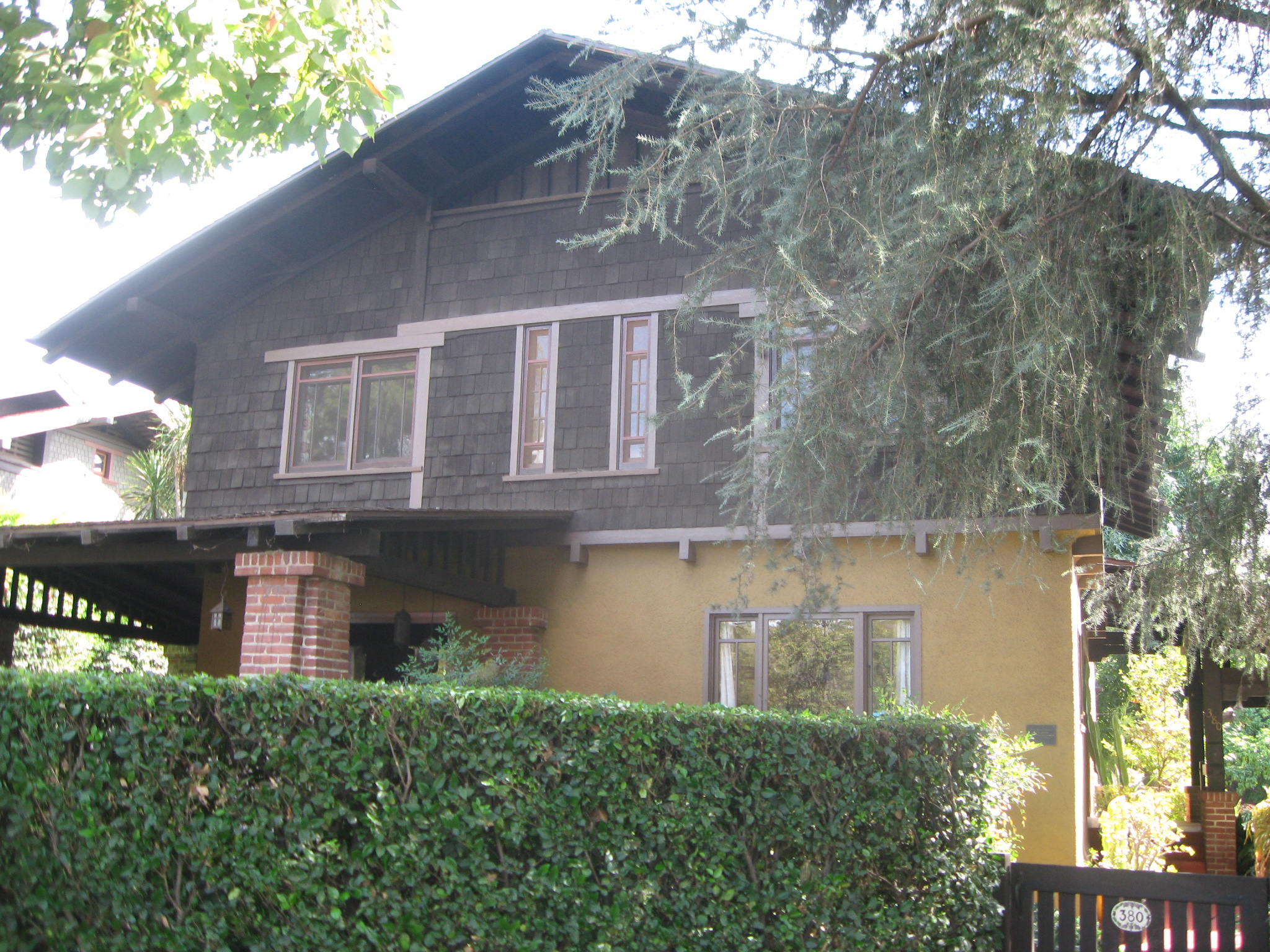

- Location within the Los Angeles metropolitan area Location within California Location within the United States
- Location: 380 W. Del Mar Blvd., Pasadena, California
- Coordinates: 34°8′26″N 118°9′30″W
- Area: less than one acre
- Built: 1910
- Architect: Easton, Louis B.
- Architectural style: American Craftsman
- MPS: Residential Architecture of Pasadena: Influence of the Arts and Crafts Movement
- NRHP reference No.: 98000961
- Added to NRHP: August 6, 1998

The W. L. Mead House is a historic house located at 380 West Del Mar Boulevard in Pasadena, California. Architect Louis B. Easton designed the American Craftsman house, which was built for W. L. Mead in 1910. The house is a two-story wood-frame structure with a brick foundation. The front-facing gable roof has wide eaves inspired by the Swiss chalet style. Both the roof and the second floor of the house are sided with wood shingles, a distinctive Craftsman feature; the first floor has a stucco exterior. The house also features a terrace covered by a wooden shed roof and supported by brick piers.

The house was added to the National Register of Historic Places on August 6, 1998.
