= Sara-Thel Court =

- U.S. National Register of Historic Places
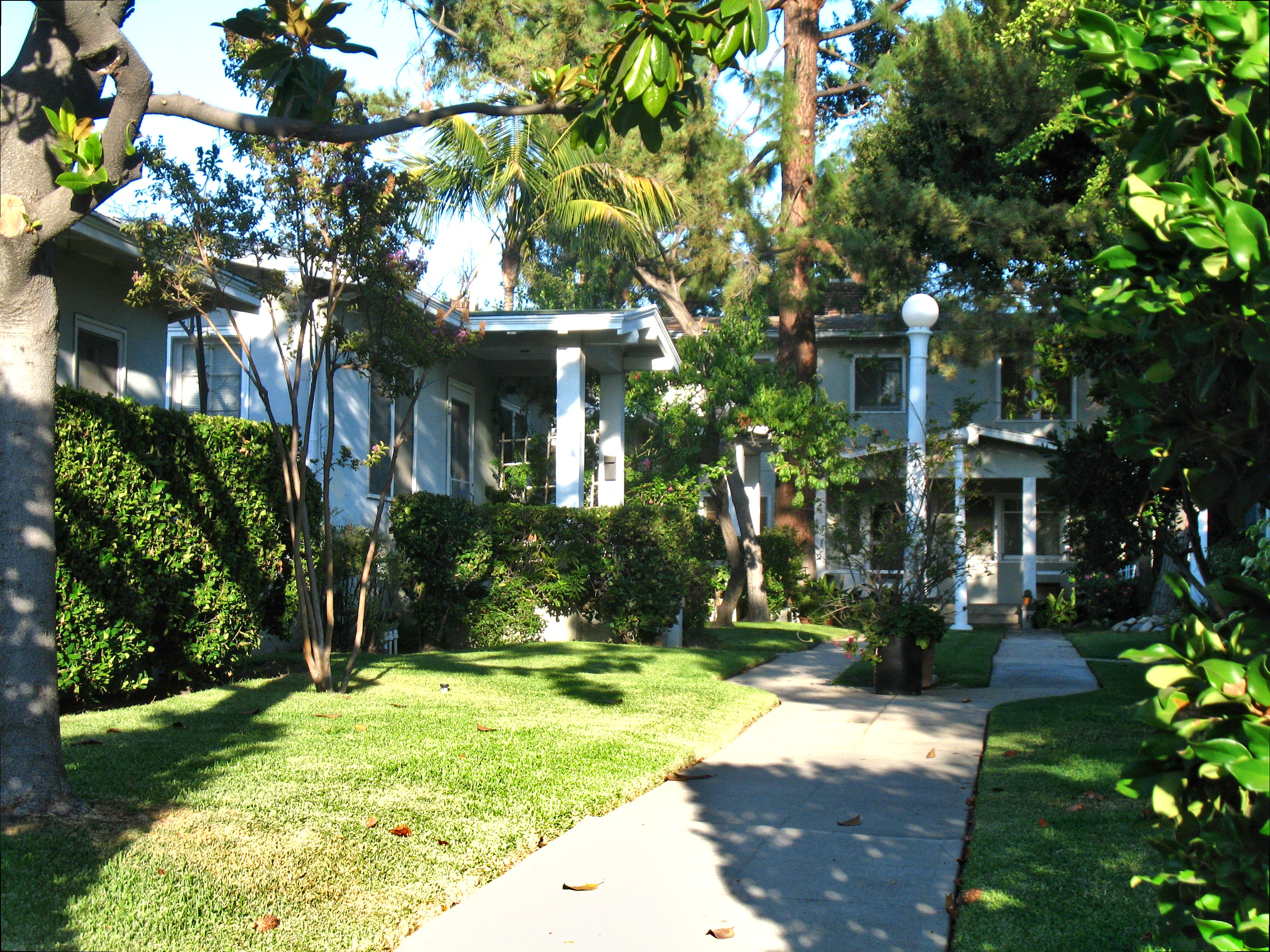

- Location within the Los Angeles metropolitan area Location within California Location within the United States
- Location: 618-630 S. Marengo Ave., Pasadena, California
- Coordinates: 34°8′6″N 118°8′41″W
- Area: 0.5 acres (0.20 ha)
- Built: 1921
- Architect: Humphreys, Jas.
- Architectural style: Colonial Revival, American Craftsman
- MPS: Bungalow Courts of Pasadena TR
- NRHP reference No.: 83001192
- Added to NRHP: July 11, 1983

Sara-Thel Court is a bungalow court located at 618-630 S. Marengo Ave. in Pasadena, California. The court includes seven buildings arranged around a central walkway; six of the buildings are single-family units, while a double unit is located at the end of the walkway. Built in 1921, the court was designed by Jas. Humphreys. The houses were mainly designed in the American Craftsman style and feature gable roofs with shallow slopes and exposed rafters; the moldings on the homes were inspired by the Colonial Revival style.
