= Evanston Inn =

- U.S. National Register of Historic Places
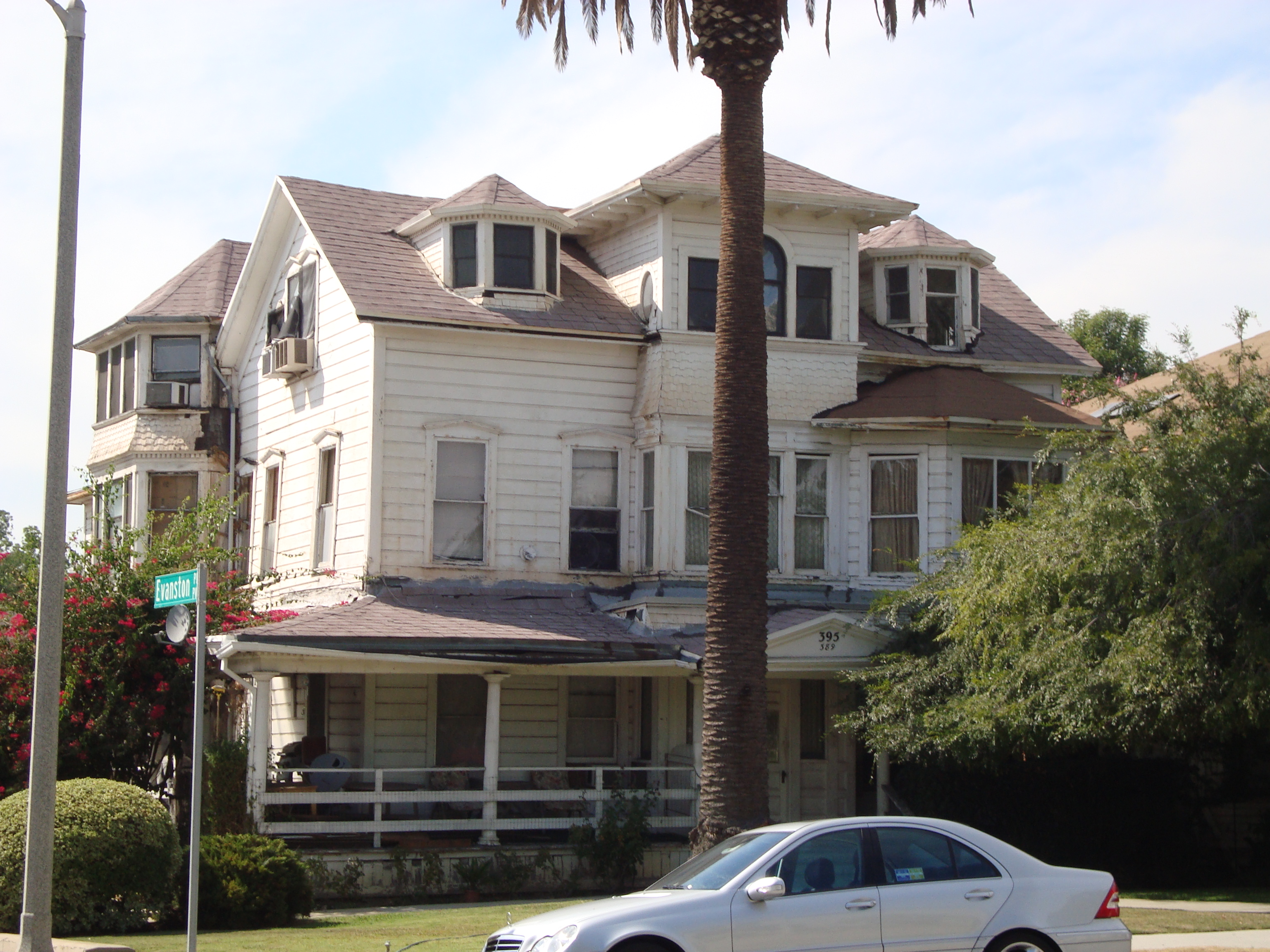

- Location within the Los Angeles metropolitan area Location within California Location within the United States
- Location: 395 S. Marengo Ave., Pasadena, California
- Coordinates: 34°8′19″N 118°8′43″W
- Area: 0.5 acres (0.20 ha)
- Built: 1898
- Architectural style: Colonial Revival, Queen Anne
- NRHP reference No.: 84000787
- Added to NRHP: September 13, 1984

The Evanston Inn is a historic hotel located at 395 S Marengo Ave. in Pasadena, California. The inn was built in 1897 and served as a smaller and less lavish alternative to Pasadena's luxury hotels. The building was designed in a combination of the Queen Anne and Colonial Revival styles, and the original section of the building features decorative shingling. In 1898 and 1905, the inn constructed additional wings due to the growth in Pasadena tourism. The inn is now the only extant wood-frame hotel in Pasadena.

The inn was added to the National Register of Historic Places on September 13, 1984.

In 2017, the inn was restored as part of a new housing development called Evanston Court. The development received preservation awards from the City of Pasadena and the California Preservation Association.
