= Court at 732–744 Santa Barbara Street =

- Court
- U.S. National Register of Historic Places
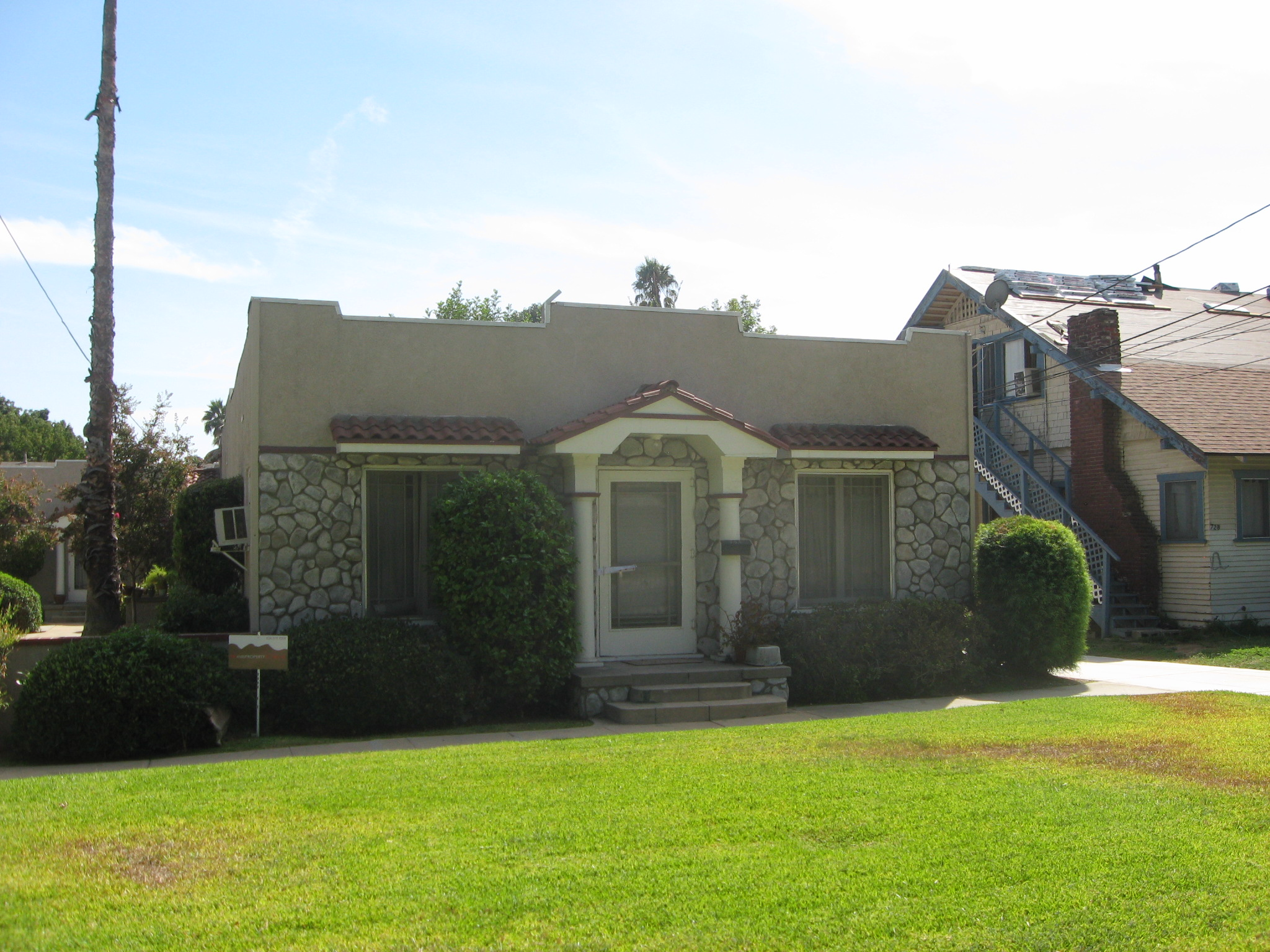

- Location within the Los Angeles metropolitan area Location within California Location within the United States
- Location: 732–744 Santa Barbara St., Pasadena, California
- Coordinates: 34°9′19″N 118°8′3″W
- Area: 0.4 acres (0.16 ha)
- Built: 1922
- Built by: Hoffman, D.
- Architectural style: Spanisn Colonial Revival
- MPS: Bungalow Courts of Pasadena TR
- NRHP reference No.: 83001189
- Added to NRHP: July 11, 1983

The Court at 732–744 Santa Barbara Street is a bungalow court located at 732–744 Santa Barbara St. in Pasadena, California. The original court includes three buildings containing five residential units surrounding a central courtyard. Contractor D. Hoffman built the court in 1922. The homes in the court were designed in the Spanish Colonial Revival style and feature porches with tile roofs atop columns and broken parapets along their roofs. A sixth building at 738 Santa Barbara was added in 1956; this building is not considered part of the historic court.

The court was added to the National Register of Historic Places on July 11, 1983.
