= Marengo Gardens =

- U.S. National Register of Historic Places
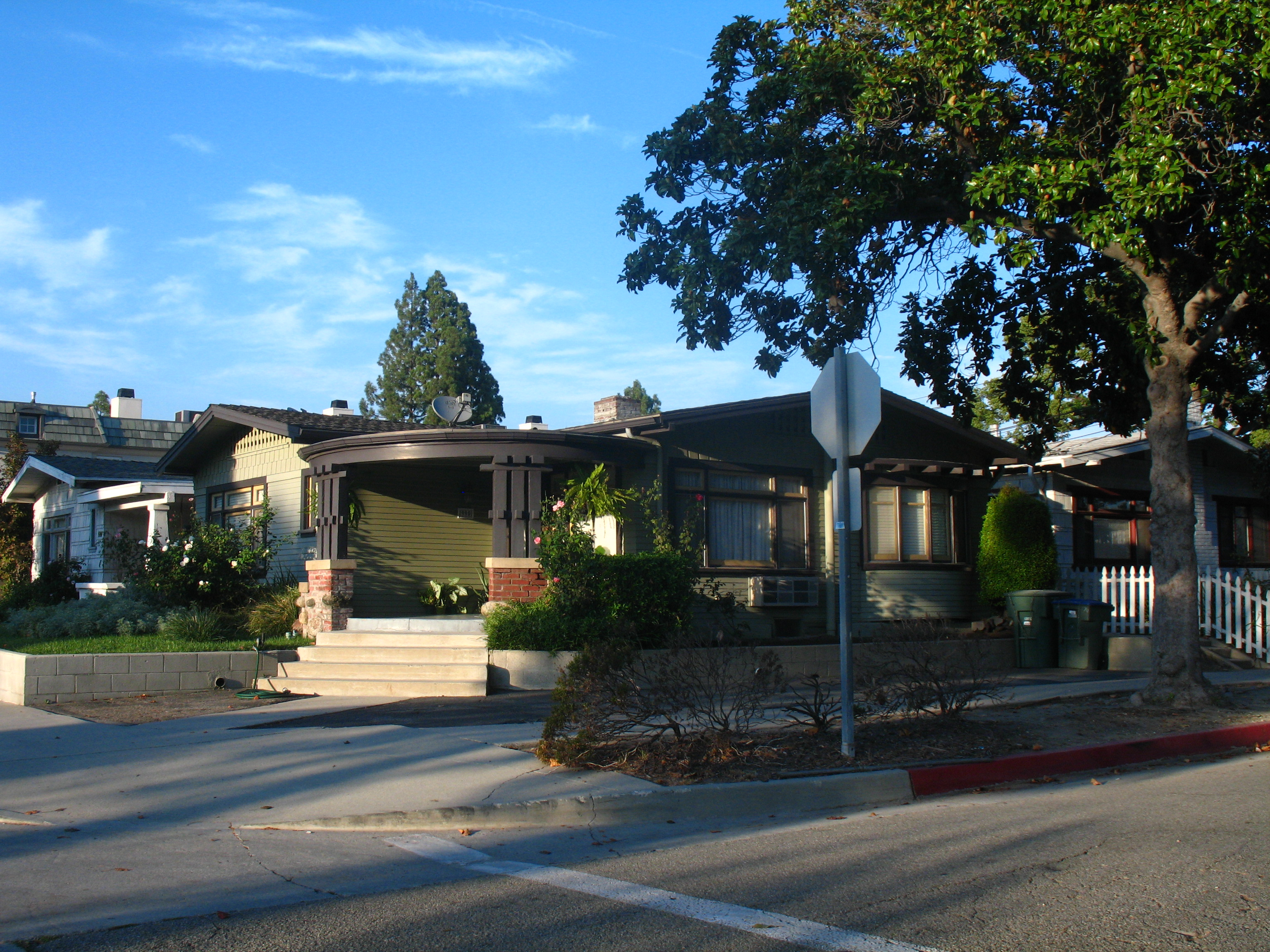

- Location within the Los Angeles metropolitan area Location within California Location within the United States
- Location: 982, 986, 990 S. Marengo Ave. and 221-241 Ohio St., Pasadena, California
- Coordinates: 34°7′58″N 118°8′40″W
- Area: 0.4 acres (0.16 ha)
- Built: 1913
- Architectural style: American Craftsman
- MPS: Bungalow Courts of Pasadena TR
- NRHP reference No.: 83001197
- Added to NRHP: July 11, 1983

Marengo Gardens is a bungalow court located at the intersection of South Marengo Avenue and Ohio Street in Pasadena, California. The court, which was built in 1913, consists of nine single-family bungalows; six of the houses are centered on a courtyard, while the remaining three face Marengo Avenue. The homes were designed in the American Craftsman style; each house includes various different features of the style, such as shingle or clapboard siding, shallow-sloped gable roofs, decorative brickwork, and buttressed piers.
