= Court at 497–503½ N. Madison Ave. =

- Court
- U.S. National Register of Historic Places
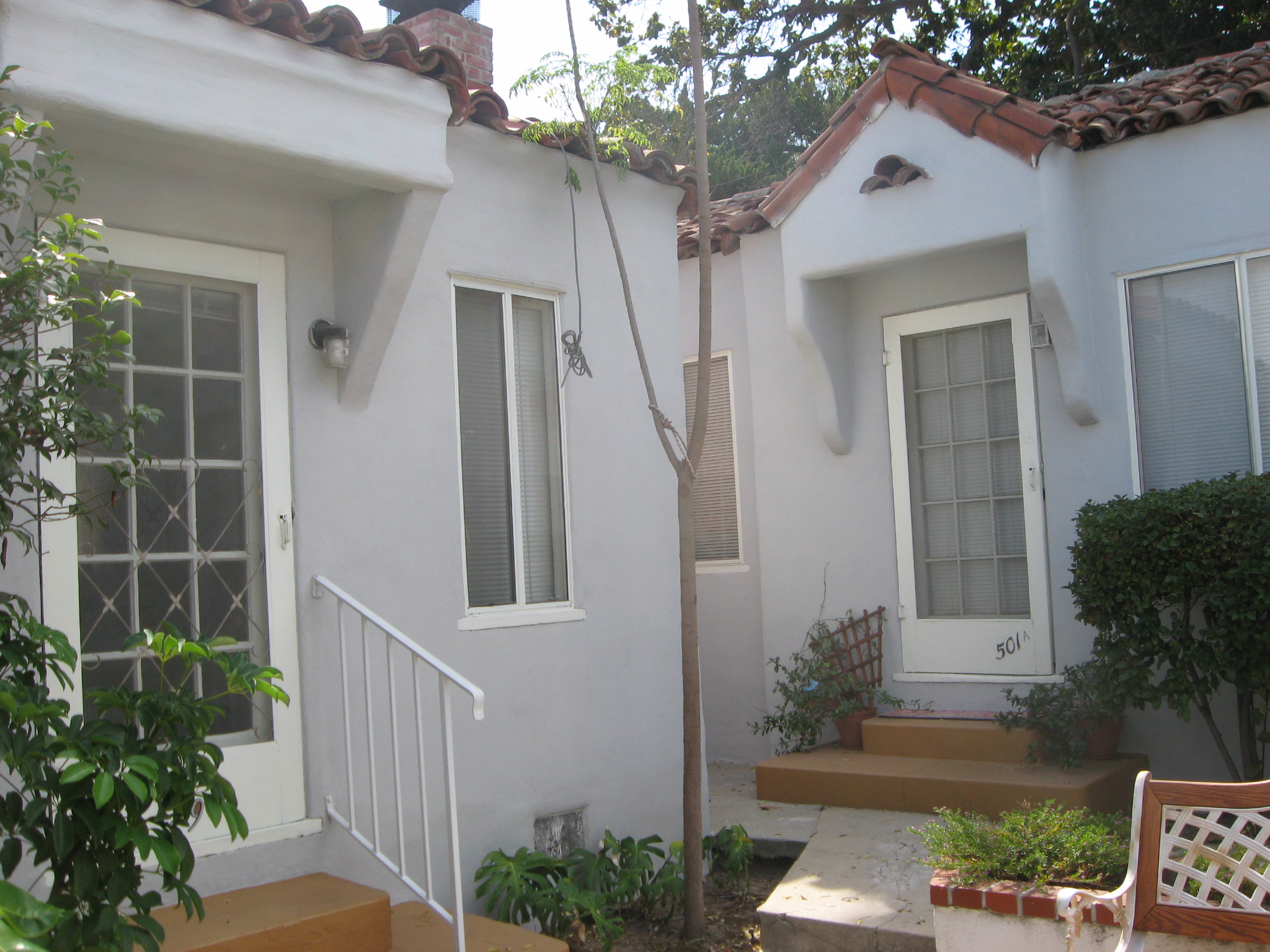

- Location within the Los Angeles metropolitan area Location within California Location within the United States
- Location: 497–503 1/2 N. Madison Ave. Pasadena, California
- Coordinates: 34°9′17″N 118°8′15″W
- Area: 0.2 acres (0.081 ha)
- Built: 1928
- Architect: Ritter, A.
- Architectural style: Spanish Colonial Revival
- MPS: Bungalow Courts of Pasadena TR
- NRHP reference No.: 83001187
- Added to NRHP: July 11, 1983

The Court at 497–503½ North Madison Avenue is a bungalow court in Pasadena, California.

== Description and history ==
The court consists of three buildings containing eight residential units; the buildings surround a narrow courtyard. The buildings were built in 1928 and designed by A. Ritter. The stucco homes in the court were designed in the Spanish Colonial Revival style and feature tile roofs, decorative grilles over the windows, and archways.

The court was added to the National Register of Historic Places on July 11, 1983.
