= Euclid Court =

- U.S. National Register of Historic Places
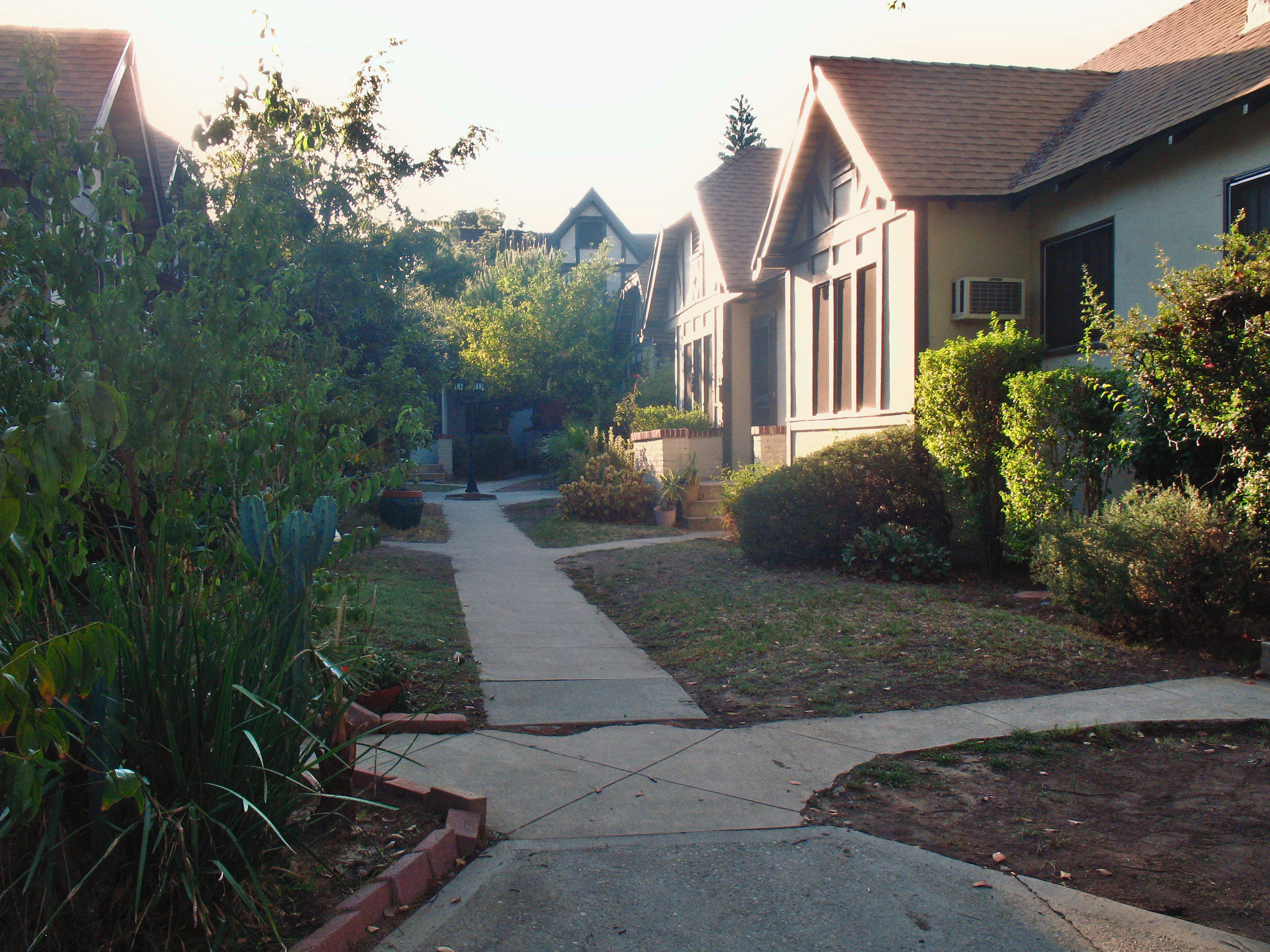

- Location within the Los Angeles metropolitan area Location within California Location within the United States
- Location: 545 S. Euclid Ave., Pasadena, California
- Coordinates: 34°8′11″N 118°8′32″W
- Area: 0.3 acres (0.12 ha)
- Built: 1921
- Architect: Postle Company
- Architectural style: Tudor Revival
- MPS: Bungalow Courts of Pasadena TR
- NRHP reference No.: 83001193
- Added to NRHP: July 11, 1983

Euclid Court is a bungalow court located at 545 S. Euclid Ave. in Pasadena, California. The court consists of eight residential units in five buildings surrounding a central courtyard. The court was built in 1921; however, one house in the court was built in 1888 and later incorporated into the court's design. The homes were designed by the Postle Company in the Tudor Revival style; their designs feature half-timbered facades, porches with brick walls, and stucco chimneys. Both gable and jerkinhead roofs were used to top the houses.

The court was added to the National Register of Historic Places on July 11, 1983.
