= Mission Court =

- U.S. National Register of Historic Places
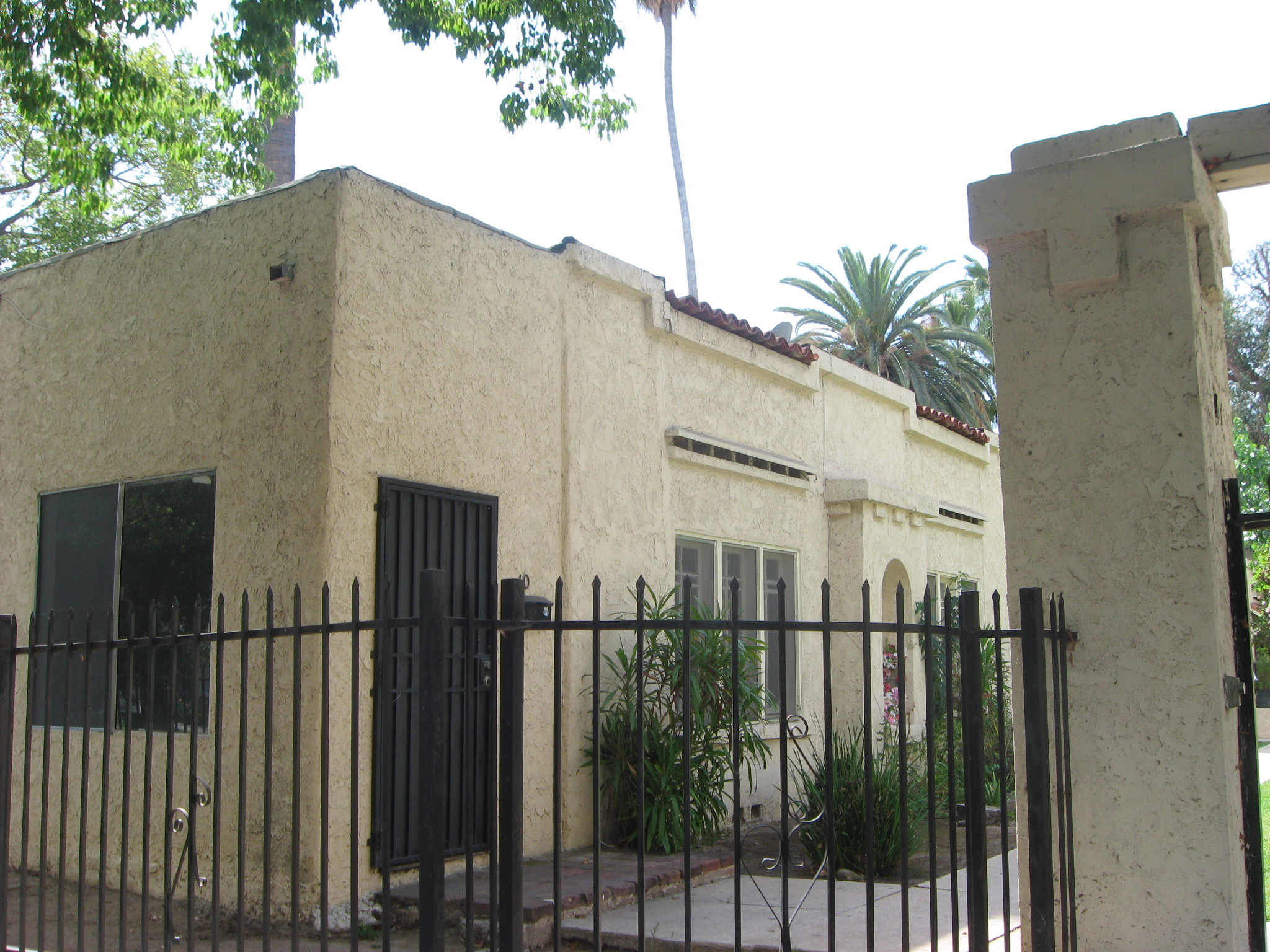

- Location within the Los Angeles metropolitan area Location within California Location within the United States
- Location: 567 N. Oakland Ave., Pasadena, California
- Coordinates: 34°9′21″N 118°8′22″W
- Area: 0.5 acres (0.20 ha)
- Built: 1913
- Architect: Walker, J. F.
- Architectural style: Bungalow/craftsman, Mission/spanish Revival
- MPS: Bungalow Courts of Pasadena TR
- NRHP reference No.: 83001198
- Added to NRHP: July 11, 1983

Mission Court is a bungalow court located at 567 N. Oakland Ave. in Pasadena, California. The court consists of eight buildings containing fourteen residential units which surround a central courtyard. Built in 1913, the court was designed by architect J. F. Walker. The houses in the court were designed in the Mission Revival style; the court is the oldest Mission Revival bungalow court in Pasadena. The houses' designs feature broken parapets along the roofs and porches with either recessed arch entrances or tiled shed roofs. The courtyard includes two buttressed piers topped by lamps.

The court was added to the National Register of Historic Places on July 11, 1983.
