= Court at 1274–1282 North Raymond Avenue =

- U.S. National Register of Historic Places
- U.S. Historic district
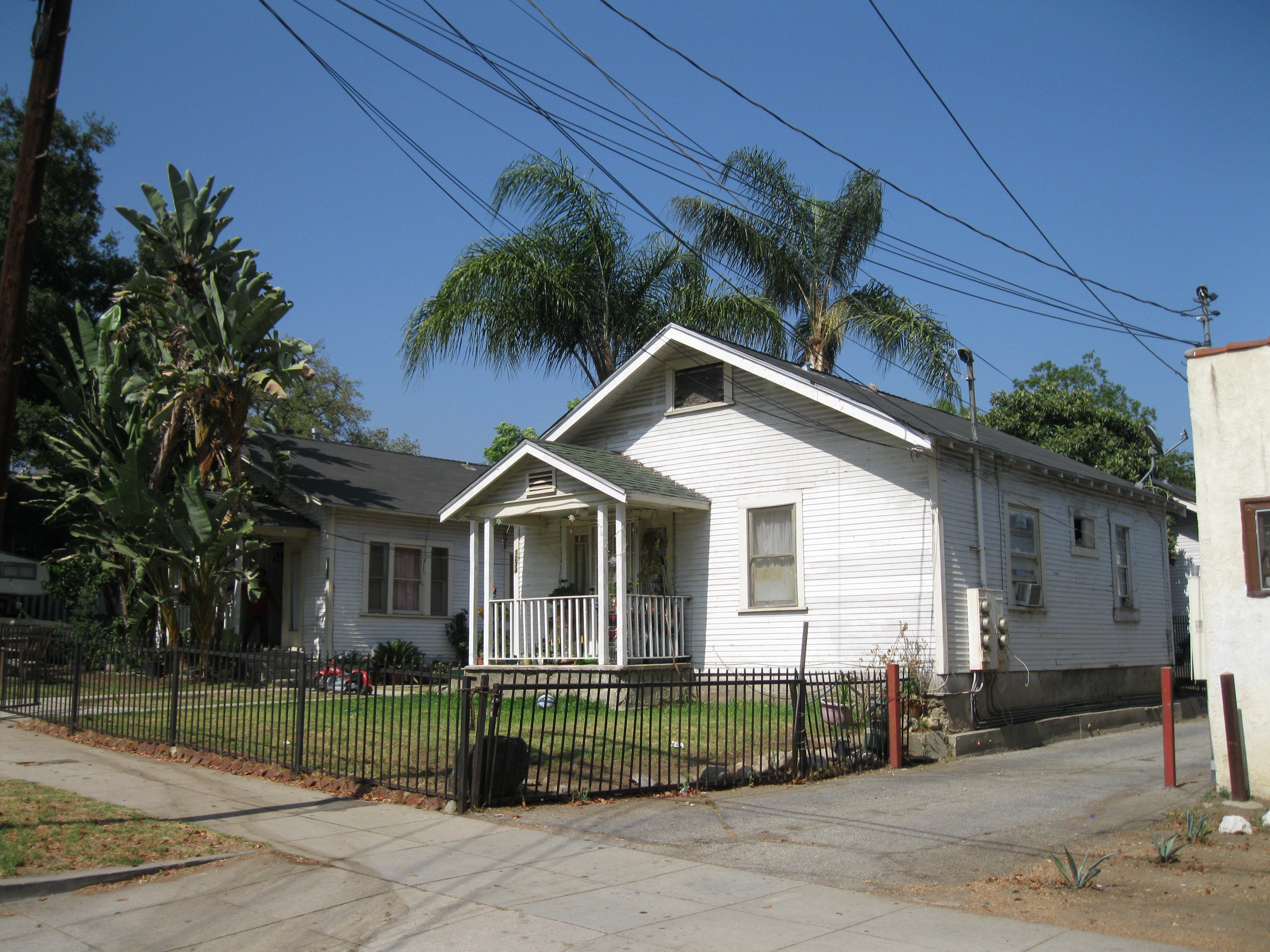

- Location within the Los Angeles metropolitan area Location within California Location within the United States
- Location: 1274–1282 N. Raymond Ave., Pasadena, California
- Coordinates: 34°10′4″N 118°8′56″W
- Area: less than one acre
- Built: 1924-25
- Built by: Valentin, Karl
- Architectural style: Colonial Revival
- MPS: Bungalow Courts of Pasadena TR
- NRHP reference No.: 94001315
- Added to NRHP: November 15, 1994

The Court at 1274–1282 North Raymond Avenue is a bungalow court located at 1274–1282 North Raymond Avenue in Pasadena, California. It consists of five one-story bungalows arranged around a central courtyard. The house is designed in a blend of the Colonial Revival and American Craftsman styles; the former can be seen in the entrance porticos on three of the buildings, while the latter is present in the homes' overhanging eaves and exposed rafter tails. Owner Karl Valentine designed and built the court in 1924–25.

The court was added to the National Register of Historic Places on November 15, 1994.
