= Holly Street Livery Stable =

- U.S. National Register of Historic Places
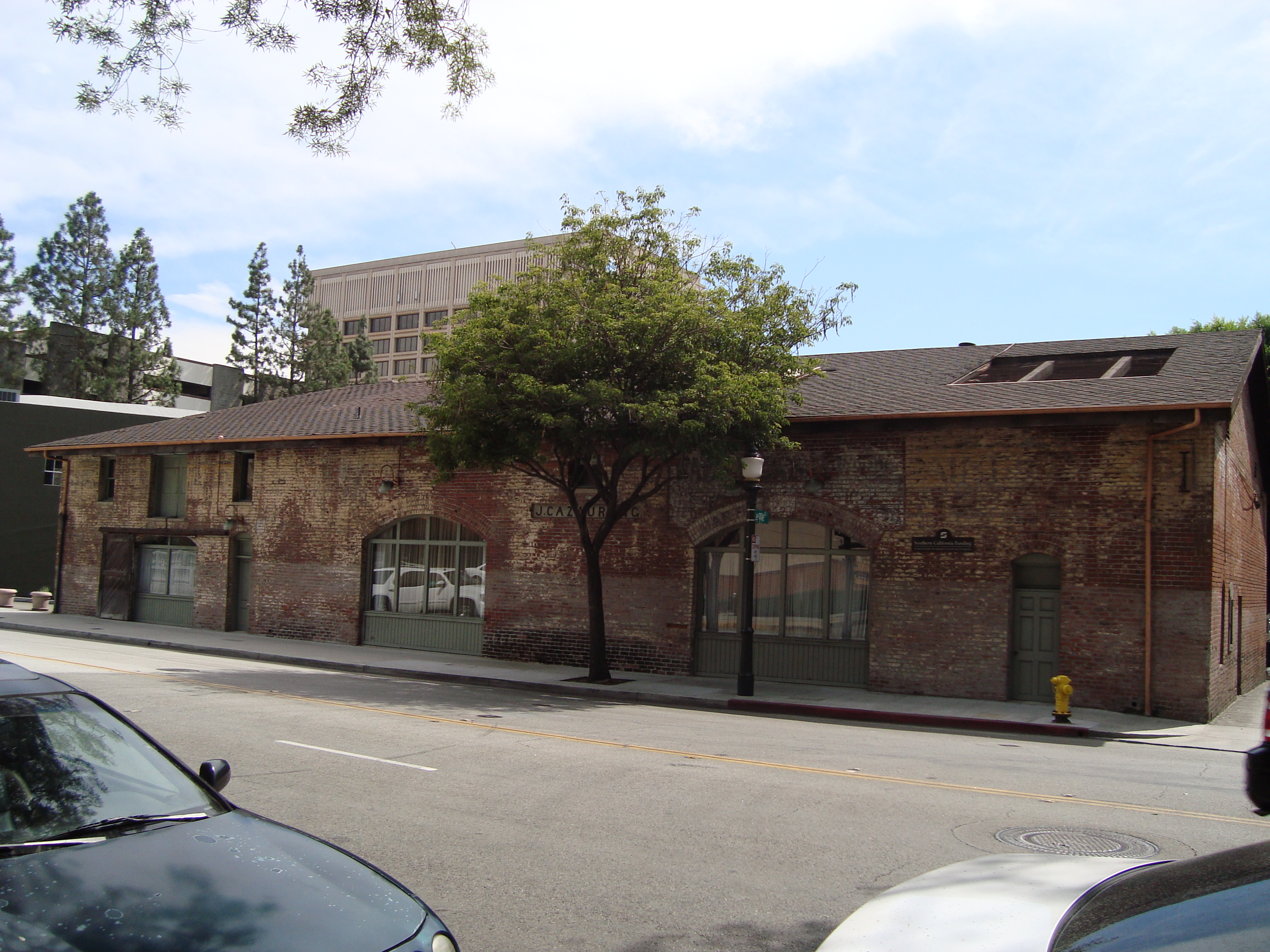

- Location within the Los Angeles metropolitan area Location within California Location within the United States
- Location: 110 E. Holly St, Pasadena, California
- Coordinates: 34°8′49″N 118°8′51″W
- Area: 0.2 acres (0.081 ha)
- Built: 1904
- Architect: Cauzerang, John & Jean
- NRHP reference No.: 79000491
- Added to NRHP: October 25, 1979

The Holly Street Livery Stable is a historic livery stable located at 110 E. Holly St. in Pasadena, California. The brick building has an irregular trapezoidal shape, as it was built next to Santa Fe Railroad tracks. Built in 1904, the stable was first used by John Breiner, who ran the Pasadena City Market; Breiner used the stable for the horses and wagons needed to deliver groceries. The stable was also used during the early years of the Rose Parade as both a float construction site and a site for hitching horses to wagons. After the automobile supplanted horse-drawn vehicles, the stable has been used for a variety of other purposes, including a Red Cross thrift store, an auto repair shop, and a furniture warehouse.

The stable was added to the National Register of Historic Places on October 25, 1979.
