= Court at 533–549 North Lincoln Avenue =

- U.S. National Register of Historic Places
- U.S. Historic district
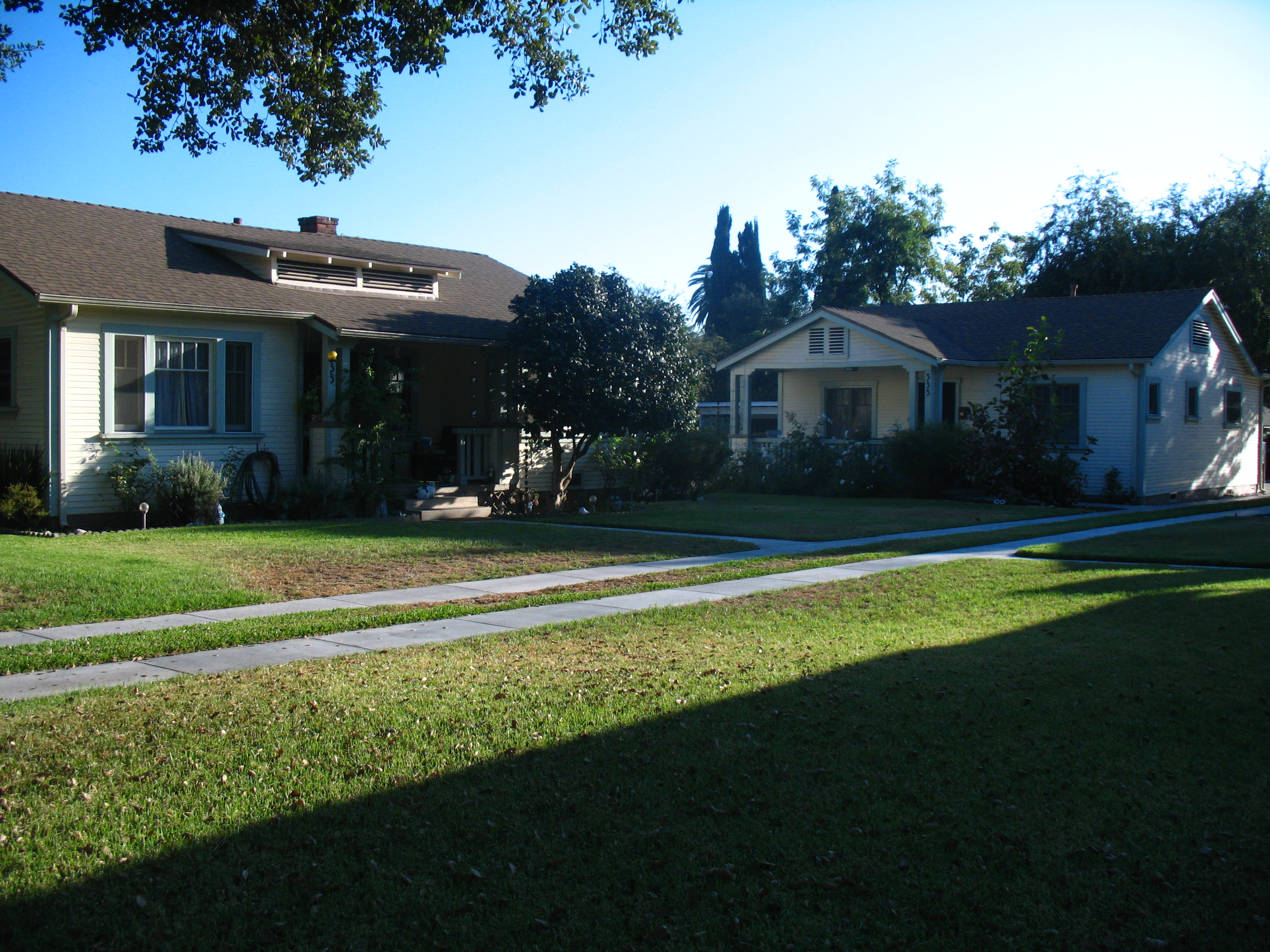

- Location within the Los Angeles metropolitan area Location within California Location within the United States
- Location: 533-549 N. Lincoln Ave., Pasadena, California
- Coordinates: 34°9′15″N 118°9′14″W
- Area: less than one acre
- Built: 1922-1925
- Built by: Whitescarver & Pieton, Joseph G. Roth
- Architect: G. Tombleson
- Architectural style: American Craftsman
- MPS: Bungalow Courts of Pasadena TR
- NRHP reference No.: 94001320
- Added to NRHP: November 15, 1994

The Court at 533–549 North Lincoln Avenue is a bungalow court located at 533-549 North Lincoln Avenue in Pasadena, California. The court consists of four bungalows surrounding a central courtyard and driveway. The bungalows have an American Craftsman design and feature gabled roofs with exposed rafter tails, casement windows, and porches supported by Doric columns. T. G. Grabham, the original owner of the court, built the four homes between 1922 and 1925. Architect G. Tombelson designed the first two homes, which were both built in 1922; contractors Whitescarver & Pieton added the third home in 1923, and contractor Joseph G. Roth built the last in 1925.

The court was added to the National Register of Historic Places on November 15, 1994.
