= Stoutenburgh House =

Historic house in California, United States

- U.S. National Register of Historic Places
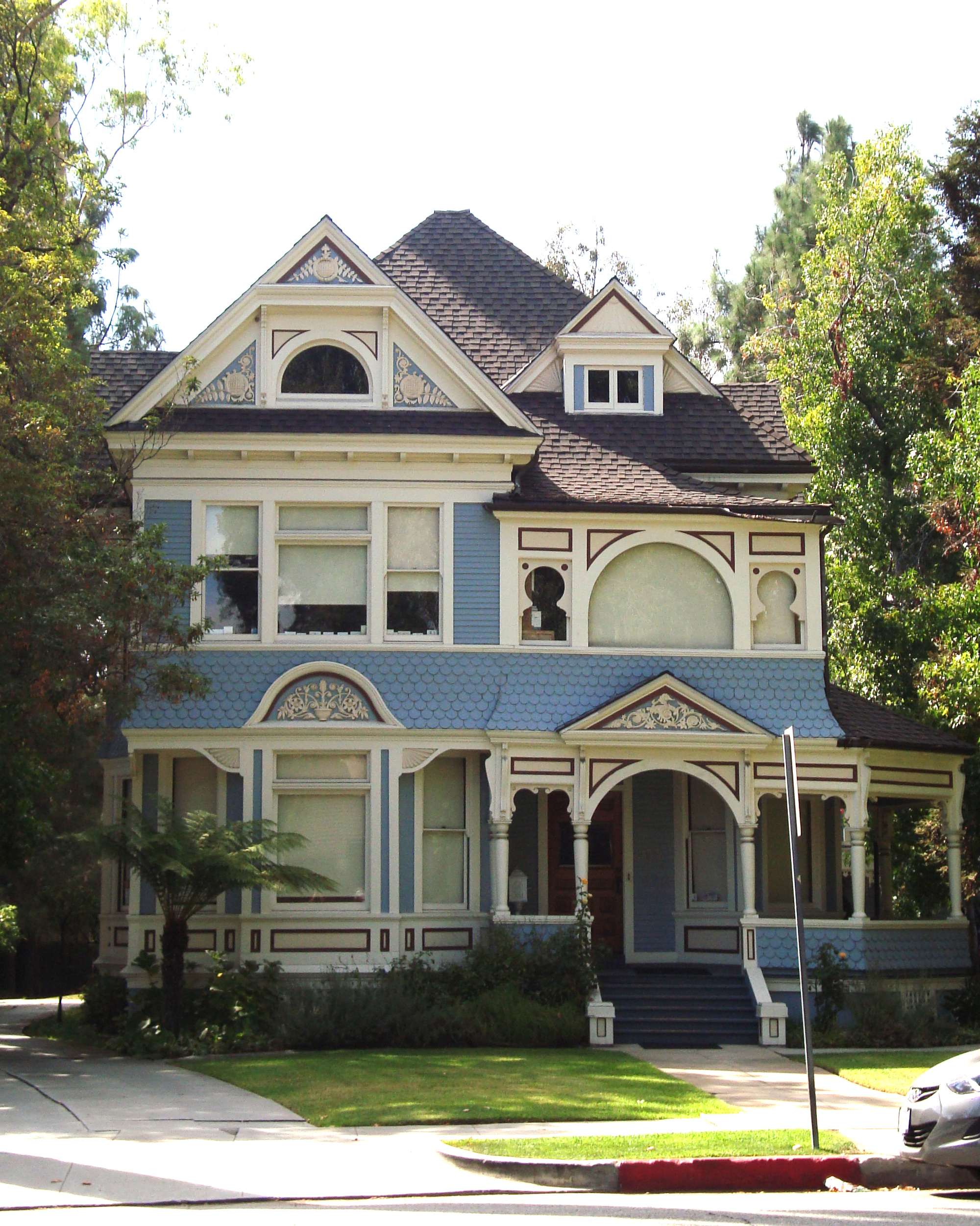

- Location within the Los Angeles metropolitan area Location within California Location within the United States
- Location: 255 S. Marengo Ave., Pasadena, California
- Coordinates: 34°8′28″N 118°8′42″W
- Area: 0.3 acres (0.12 ha)
- Built: 1893
- Built by: Fellows, Thomas
- Architect: Bradbeer, J. H.
- Architectural style: Queen Anne
- NRHP reference No.: 80000814
- Added to NRHP: November 25, 1980

The Stoutenburgh House is a historic house located at 255 S. Marengo Ave. in Pasadena, California. Built in 1893, the house was designed by Los Angeles architect J. H. Bradbeer in the Queen Anne style. The house's design features a roof with many gables, multiple porches with turned columns and brackets carved by bandsaws, and patterned shingle siding. An original carriage house is also located on the property. John and Mary Stoutenburgh, a prominent local couple, lived in the house; John died in 1904, but Mary occupied the house into the 1920s. The house underwent extensive restoration between c.1980 and 1983.

The house was added to the National Register of Historic Places on November 25, 1980.
