= North Park, San Diego =

Neighborhood in California, US

Coordinates: 32°44′26.99″N 117°07′46.99″W

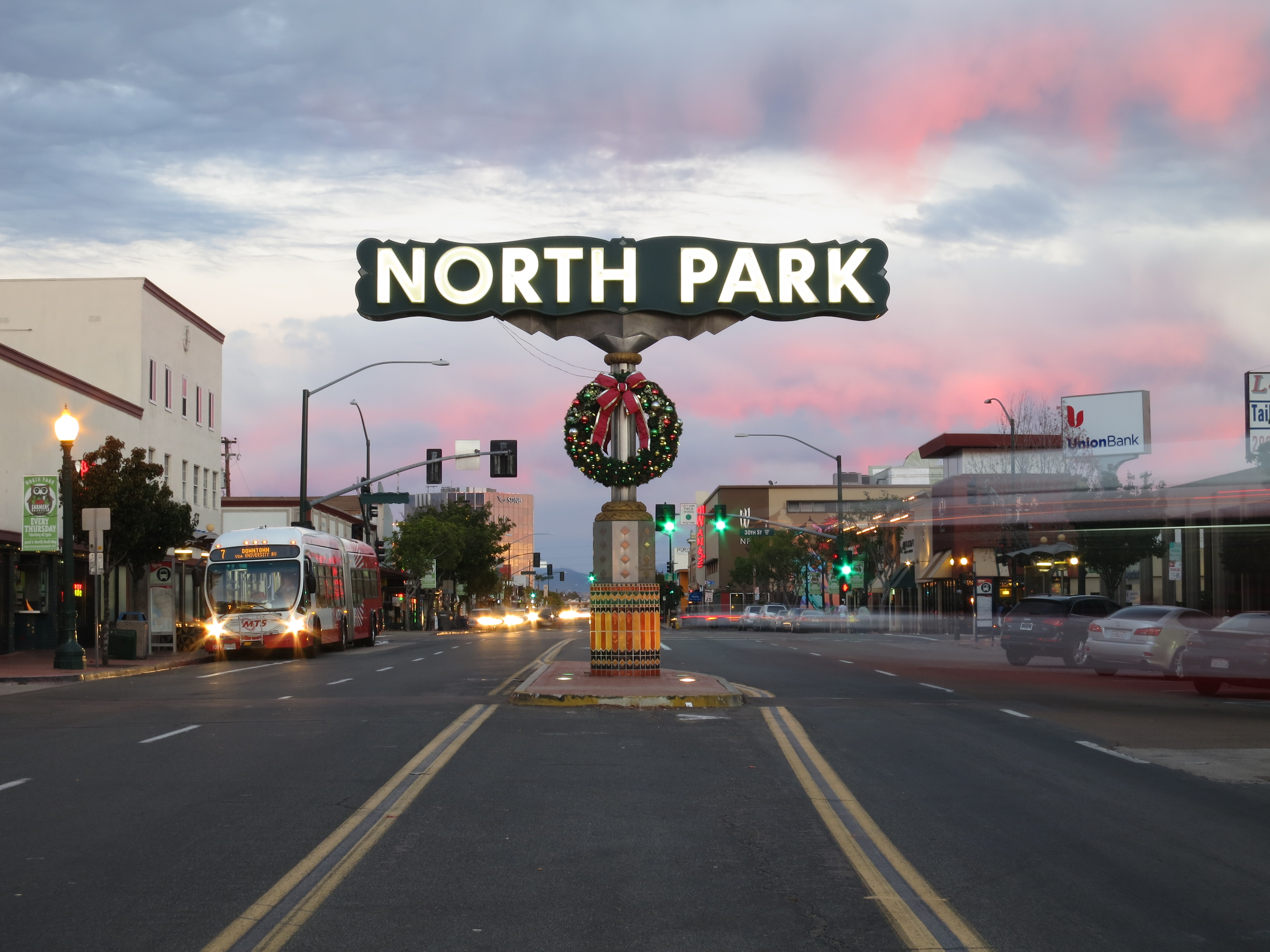
North Park sign near the intersection of 30th Street and University Avenue at dusk.

North Park is a neighborhood in San Diego, California, United States, as well as a larger "community" as defined by the City of San Diego for planning purposes. The neighborhood is bounded:

- on the northwest by Park Boulevard and University Heights
- on the west by Florida Canyon and both University Heights and Hillcrest
- on the southwest by Balboa Park
- on the south by Switzer Canyon and the South Park neighborhood
- on the east by Interstate 805 and City Heights

The pre-Interstate 805 boundary of North Park was widely considered to be 35th Street, which is now part of City Heights.

It includes the sub-neighborhoods of Burlingame, Altadena, and the Morley Field area (site of the Dryden Historic District). North Park is part of California's 50th congressional district, and San Diego City Council District 3.

The "community" of North Park as defined for planning purposes includes University Heights on the north and Juniper Canyon as the southern boundary, thus including as far southeast as Cedar Ridge Park in the officially defined community.

The North Park sign can be seen at 30th Street and University Avenue, and this intersection is considered to be the heart of the neighborhood.

== History ==
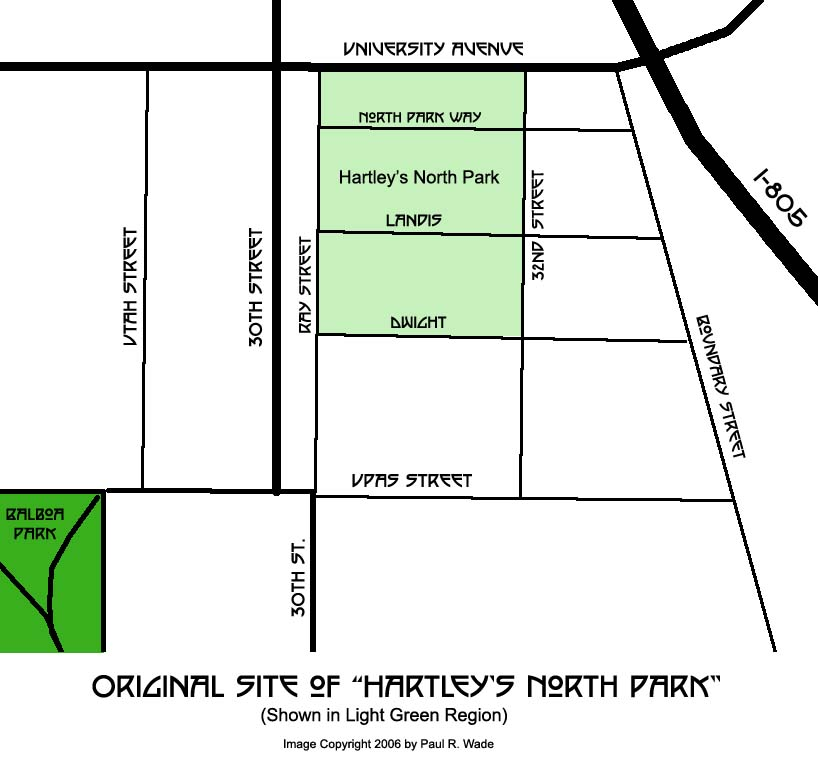
Original Boundaries of Hartley's North Park

In the summer of 1893, San Diego merchant Joseph Nash sold 40 acres (16 ha) of land northeast of Balboa Park to James Monroe Hartley, who wished to develop a lemon grove. The Hartley family began the arduous process of clearing the land to prepare the earth for the grove, but providing the fledgling trees with proper irrigation was always a problem. Barrels of water had to be hauled from downtown San Diego up a wagon trail that eventually was called Pershing Drive.

As the growth of San Diego eventually caught up with the original Hartley lemon grove, it eventually became roughly bordered by Ray Street to the west, 32nd Street to the east, University Avenue to the north and Dwight Street to the south. Hartley deemed his area Hartley's North Park, and years later, the City of San Diego referred to the new suburb as North Park.

In 1911, Hartley's eldest son Jack and brother-in-law William Jay Stevens developed the plot into one of San Diego's early residential and commercial districts. After first establishing Stevens & Hartley, North Park's first real estate firm, in 1905, Jack and William built North Park's first "high rise" commercial building, the Stevens building, on the northwest corner of 30th Street and University Avenue in 1912. For many years occupied by Western Dental, today it is home to Replay Toys and North Park Main Street. "Thirtieth & University" became North Park's symbolic place name, and within 10 years, this became the heart of the community.

Later in the 1910s, North Park became one of the many San Diego neighborhoods connected by the Class 1 streetcars and an extensive San Diego public transit system that was spurred by the Panama–California Exposition of 1915 and built by John D. Spreckels. These streetcars became a fixture of this neighborhood until their retirement in 1949.

== Architecture ==
Although North Park 92104 is a neighborhood of mixed architectural styles from many eras, one area of note is the Morley Field area of North Park. Named for its proximity to Balboa Park's Morley Field Sports Complex, this area is lined with turn-of-the-century Craftsman Bungalows and California Bungalows. Because many of the homes were designed by designer and builder David Owen Dryden, the area is the site of the "Dryden Historic District." This historical district includes the homes along 28th and Pershing Streets, both bordered on the south by Upas Street and to the north by Landis Street. North Park Dryden Historic District was approved by Historical Resources Board on June 23, 2011 An application for designation of 28th Street and Pershing Avenue from Upas to Landis Streets as a historic district was filed with the City of San Diego Historical Resources Board in May 2007. In September 2008, City staff requested additional information. The Working Group submitted a Supplemental Application in January 2009. The Supplemental Application discusses why the neighborhood reflects significant elements of North Park's development, justifies the proposed district boundaries and nominates Edward F. Bryans, who built more than a dozen homes in the proposed district, as a Master Builder.

On June 23, 2011, the City's Historical Resources Board (HRB) approved, by a vote of 8-0, establishment of the North Park Dryden Historic District and also approved Edward F. Bryans as a Master Builder. Of the 136 homes in the District, 104 were approved by the HRB as contributing resources to the District.

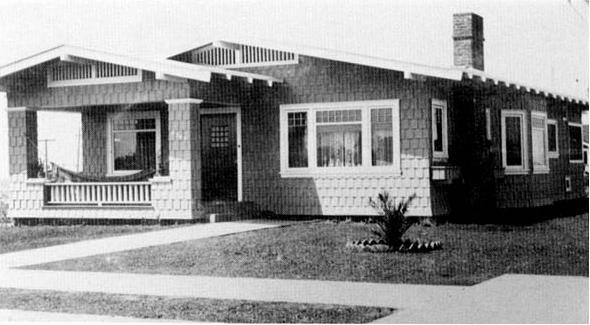
Dryden House, North Park, San Diego

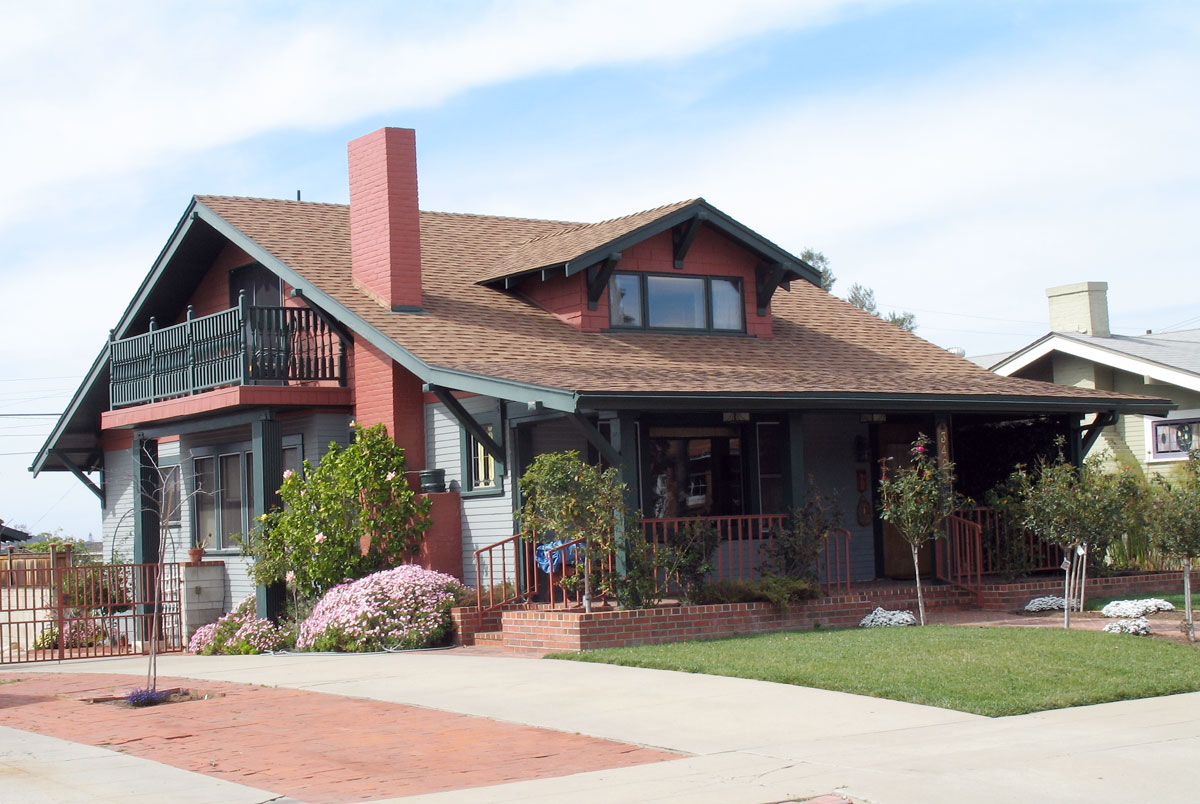
Craftsman-style bungalow in North Park

As evidenced above, interest in the history of North Park (especially its architecture) appears to be growing. Helping to foster this interest and awareness is the North Park Historical Society, a local volunteer civic organization. The North Park Historical Society manages a website which contains many articles about historic sites, people and events; North Park walking tours; and information about committee projects and meeting information. Some of the site's extensive collection of articles on North Park's history were written by Donald Covington - historian, Dryden Expert and North Park enthusiast.

== Arts, culture and cuisine ==
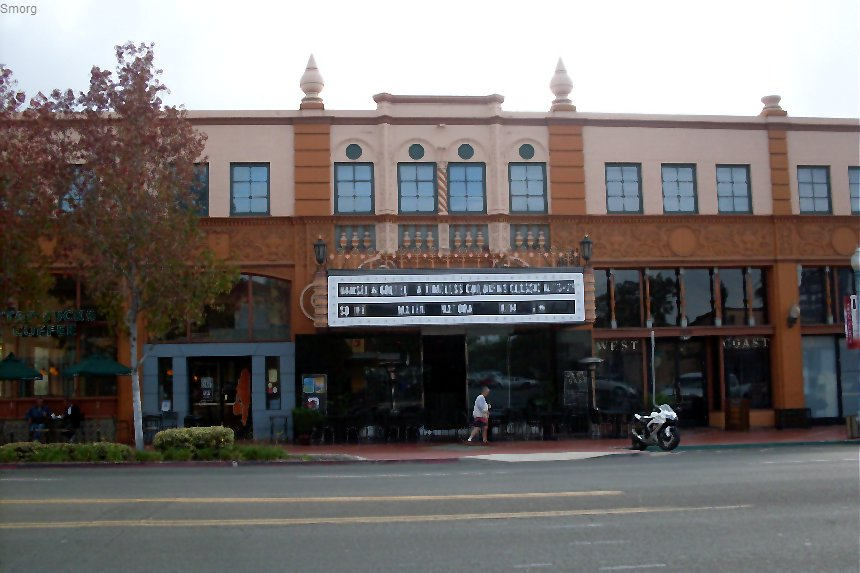
North Park Theater

In 2012, Forbes named North Park as one of America's best hipster neighborhoods, noting that "culturally diverse North Park is home to Craftsman cottages, cafes and diners, coffee shops, several microbreweries, boutiques, and the North Park Farmers Market. The North Park Theater and the Ray Street Arts District are also bastions of creativity in the area"

The Los Angeles Times writes: "North Park has all the ingredients for the cool school: It's culturally diverse and has art galleries, boutiques, trendy bars with handcrafted cocktails and local brews, and foodie-approved eateries."

An eclectic and diverse array of restaurants, as well as independent coffee shops, can be found along the main arteries of 30th Street and University Avenue. The area is also dotted with bars and night clubs that cater to a wide diversity of patrons. Crazee Burger is a restaurant in the neighborhood that offers burgers of exotic meats, such as alligator and camel.

Downtown North Park contains the Ray Street Arts District. Ray at Night is a gallery walk held the second Saturday of every month in North Park. It is the largest and longest running art walk in San Diego's history.

Nearby, the Observatory North Park, a concert venue, occupies the former Birch North Park Theatre, the former home of Lyric Opera San Diego. The historic theater underwent major renovations in 2005. The permanent seats were removed in 2015 for its new use.

North Park has a farmers' market every Thursday, rain or shine, from 3:00 – 7:30 pm. The market is located on North Park Way between Granada Ave. and Ray Street, plus the new Mini-park behind the Observatory. They feature over 35 independent vendors; locally grown produce/flowers; diverse foods; arts and crafts; books; and, often, live music.

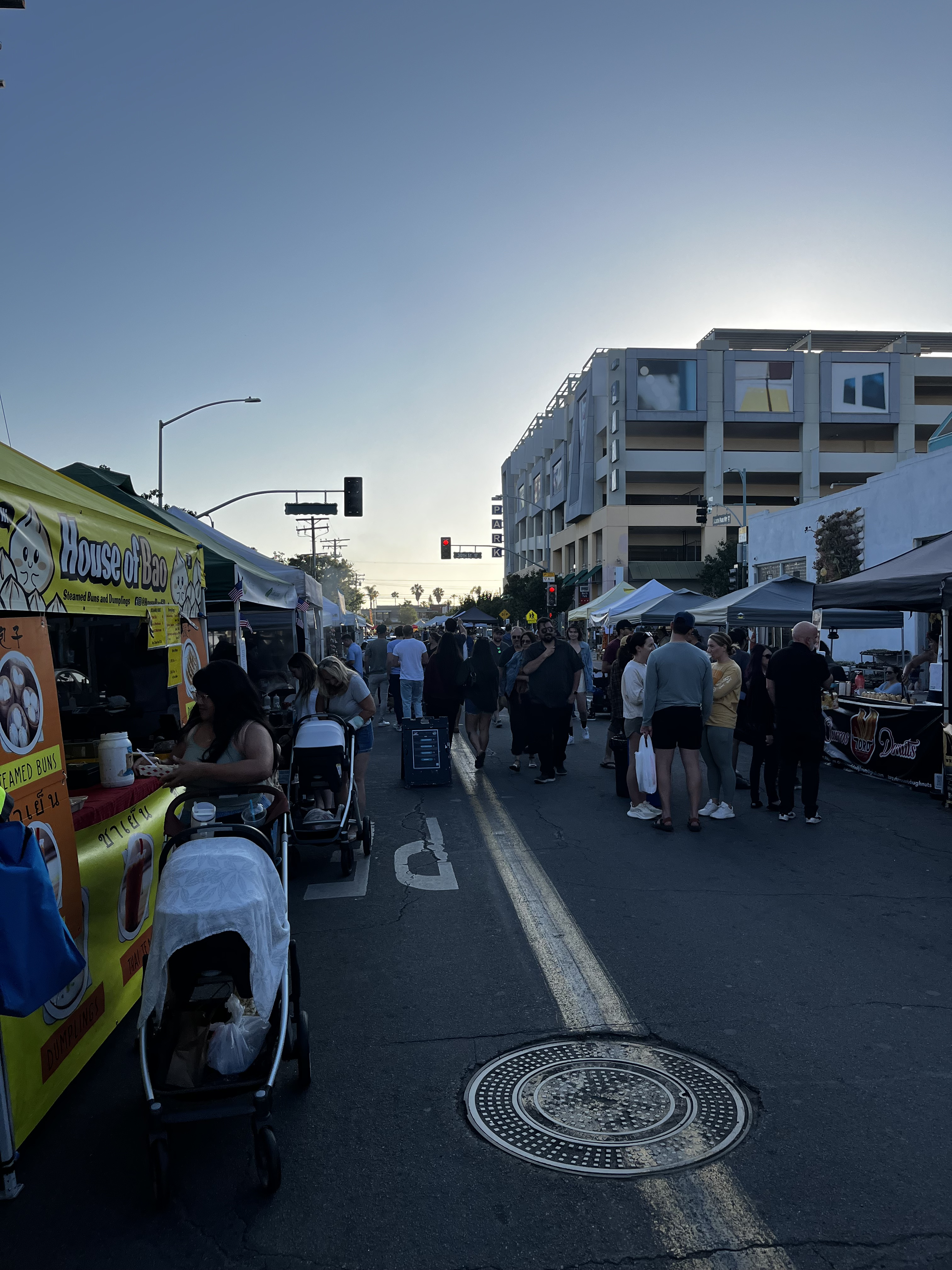
Farmer's market seen from Ray St

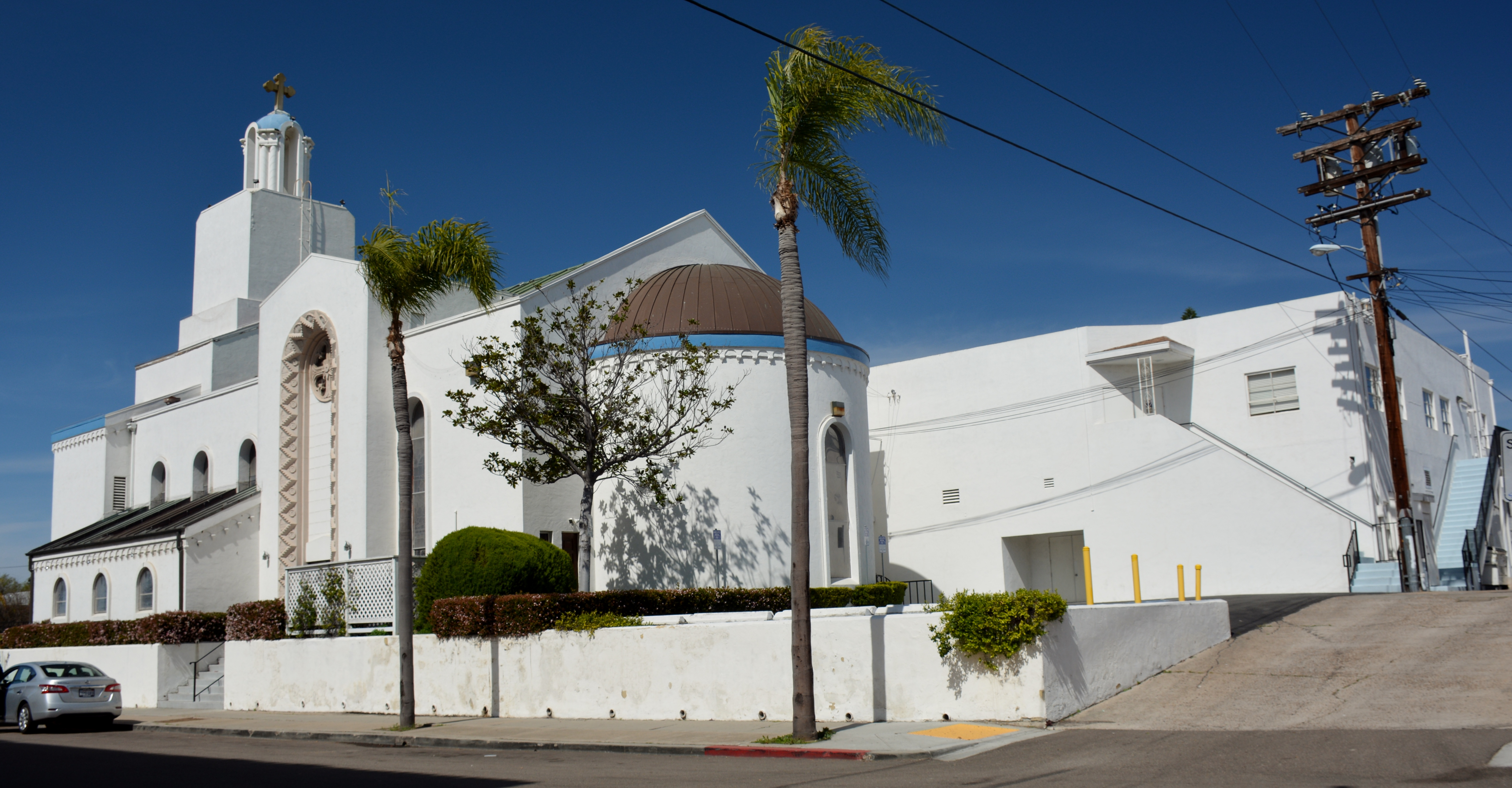
St. Spyridon Greek Orthodox Church

The San Diego Music Foundation hosts a large musical festival—North Park Music Thing—in the fall on El Cajon Boulevard, which helps add to North Park's reputation as an arts community in San Diego.

As a tradition every December, North Park holds its annual holiday parade, the North Park Toyland Parade, presented by the North Park Lions Club.

Like other urban San Diego communities, North Park has a high rate of pedestrian activity, relative to other regions of San Diego County.

== Publications ==
- The book North Park: A San Diego Urban Village has been published by the North Park Historical Society. It recollects the development of the neighborhood from 1896 to 1946, and includes an array of historic photos of the area.
- North Park calendars are published by the North Park Historical Society.
- The San Diego Uptown News covers North Park and surrounding communities.
- North Park Main Street's website features Once Upon a Time in North Park articles, submitted by various writers from the North Park Historical Society.

== Transportation ==
Transportation is served by Interstate 805, which is accessible from the University Avenue and El Cajon Boulevard exits.

University Avenue and El Cajon Boulevard are the major east-west thoroughfares in North Park. University Avenue leads west to Hillcrest and east to City Heights and La Mesa. El Cajon Boulevard leads west to Washington Avenue and Mission Hills and continues east to the city of El Cajon. Florida Street connects North Park to downtown San Diego through Florida Canyon in Balboa Park to the south, and to Adams Avenue and University Heights to the north. 30th Street connects North Park to Adams Avenue and Normal Heights to the north, and to South Park and Golden Hill to the south. Texas Street heads north directly into Mission Valley.

There is substantial bus service (bus routes 1,2,6,7,10,11, and 215 connecting to downtown San Diego as well as to the transportation hub in Old Town). The busiest bus line corridor in the San Diego metro region, known as the University Avenue transit corridor (bus routes 7 and 10), traverses North Park.

== Government and infrastructure ==
Stephen Whitburn has represented City Council District 3 since 2020.

The United States Postal Service operated the North Park Post Office at 3791 Grim Avenue. This post office was closed in July 2011 due to budget cuts in the postal service. The building, with its original Post Office signage, now houses Tribute Pizza.

== Organizations ==
- North Park Main Street: North Park's business community is also served by a business improvement district called North Park Main Street.
- North Park Community Association: Residents of North Park are served by the NPCA, an all-volunteer group that hosts free Bird Park Summer Concerts, runs a "Stop Graffiti Now!" campaign, connects neighbors who have common concerns, and promotes local businesses through its Member Discount Program.
- North Park Planning Committee: This organization (NPPC) represents the community in land use and community development issues providing recommendations to the City of San Diego.
- North Park Historical Society: This organization is focused on the History of North Park and features educational and outreach programs, and events (such as an annual car show and walking tours). Its website can be found at http://www.northparkhistory.org.

== Books ==
- North Park: A San Diego Urban Village recollects the development of the neighborhood from 1896 to 1946. Copies of this book are available from the North Park Historical Society and online bookstores.
