= Cottage Court =

Housing development in Pasadena, California, US

- U.S. National Register of Historic Places
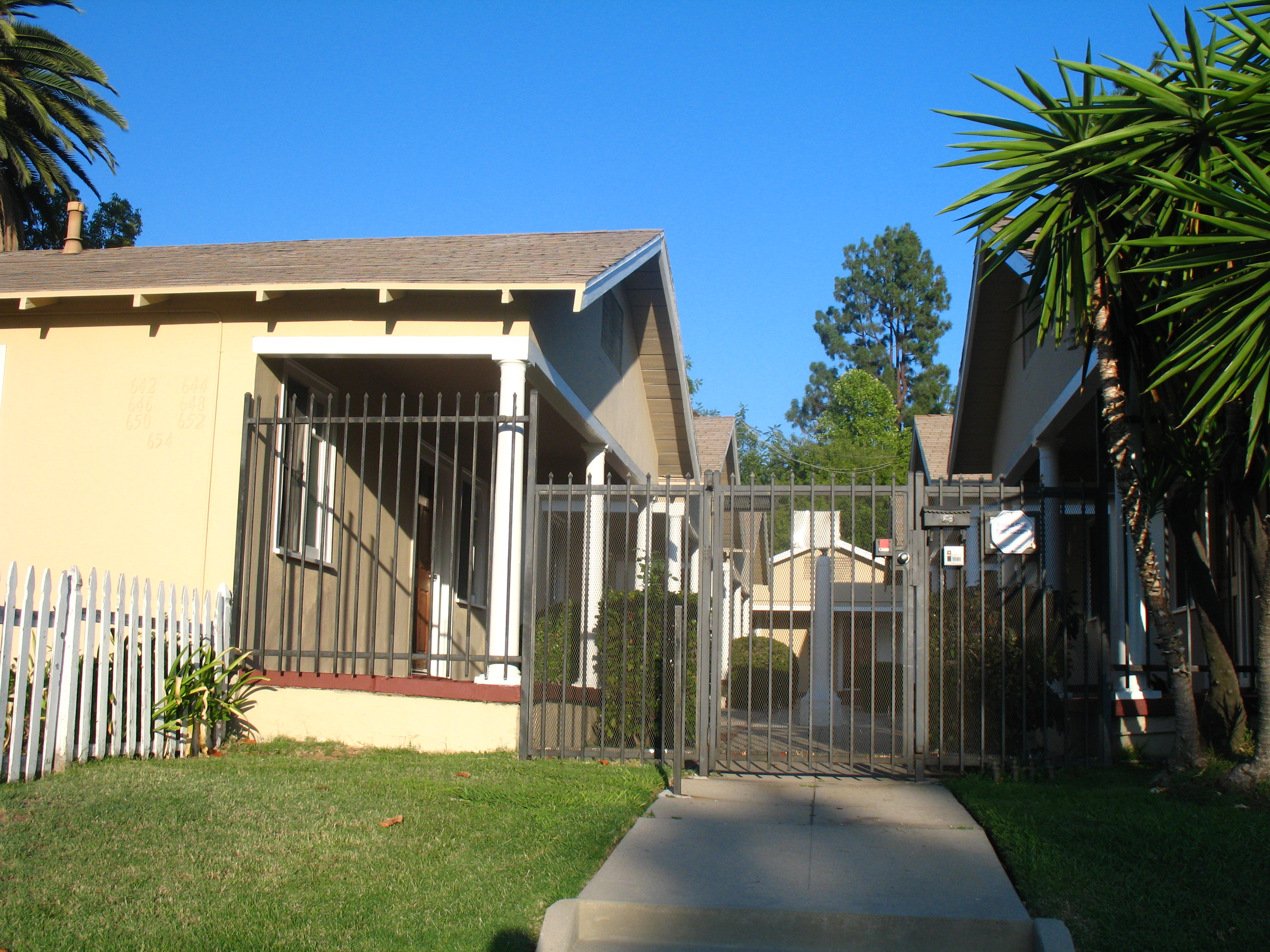

- Location within the Los Angeles metropolitan area Location within California Location within the United States
- Location: 642-654 S. Marengo Ave., Pasadena, California
- Coordinates: 34°8′4″N 118°8′41″W
- Area: 0.4 acres (0.16 ha)
- Built: 1923
- Architectural style: Colonial Revival
- MPS: Bungalow Courts of Pasadena TR
- NRHP reference No.: 83001186
- Added to NRHP: July 11, 1983

Cottage Court is a bungalow court located at 642–654 S. Marengo Ave. in Pasadena, California. The court consists of seven houses surrounding a narrow courtyard. The stucco homes were built in 1923 and designed in the Colonial Revival style. The designs feature gable roofs with wide eaves and recessed porches with supporting columns. The courtyard includes a walkway and two light poles.

The court was added to the National Register of Historic Places on July 11, 1983.
