= Harnetiaux Court =

- U.S. National Register of Historic Places
- U.S. Historic district
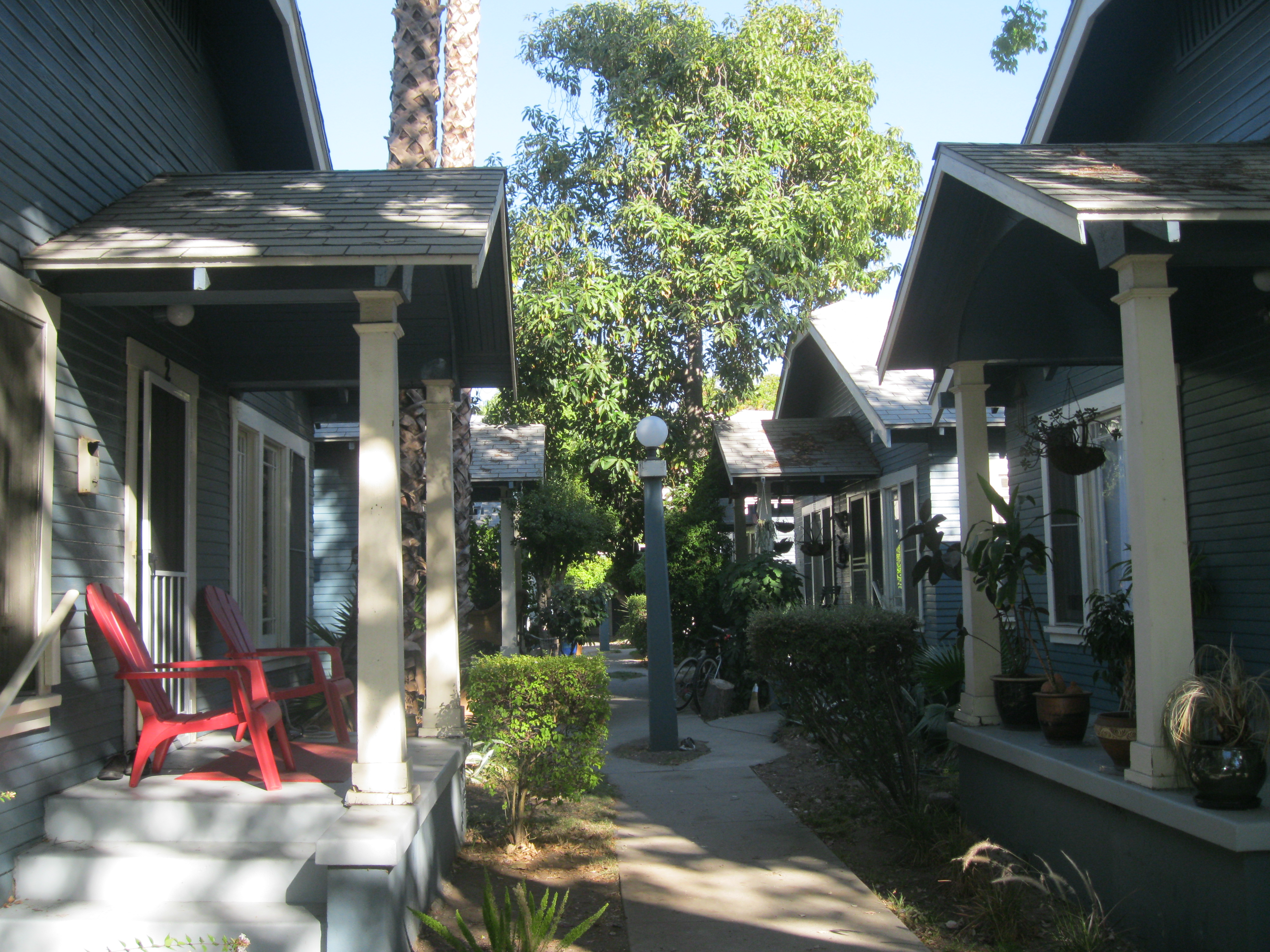
- The court's central walkway

- Location within the Los Angeles metropolitan area Location within California Location within the United States
- Location: 48 N. Catalina Ave., Pasadena, California
- Coordinates: 34°8′49″N 118°7′45″W
- Area: less than one acre
- Built: 1922
- Built by: Harnetiaux, Joseph
- Architectural style: Colonial Revival
- MPS: Bungalow Courts of Pasadena TR
- NRHP reference No.: 94001321
- Added to NRHP: November 15, 1994

Harnetiaux Court is a bungalow court located at 48 N. Catalina Avenue in Pasadena, California. Joseph Harnetiaux and his family built the court in 1922. The court consists of eight single-family homes lining a narrow court and a two-story duplex at the end of the court. The homes were designed in the Colonial Revival style and feature entrance porticos supported by Tuscan columns, jerkinhead roofs, and multi-paned windows. Camphor trees line the front of the court along Catalina Avenue.

The court was added to the National Register of Historic Places on November 15, 1994.

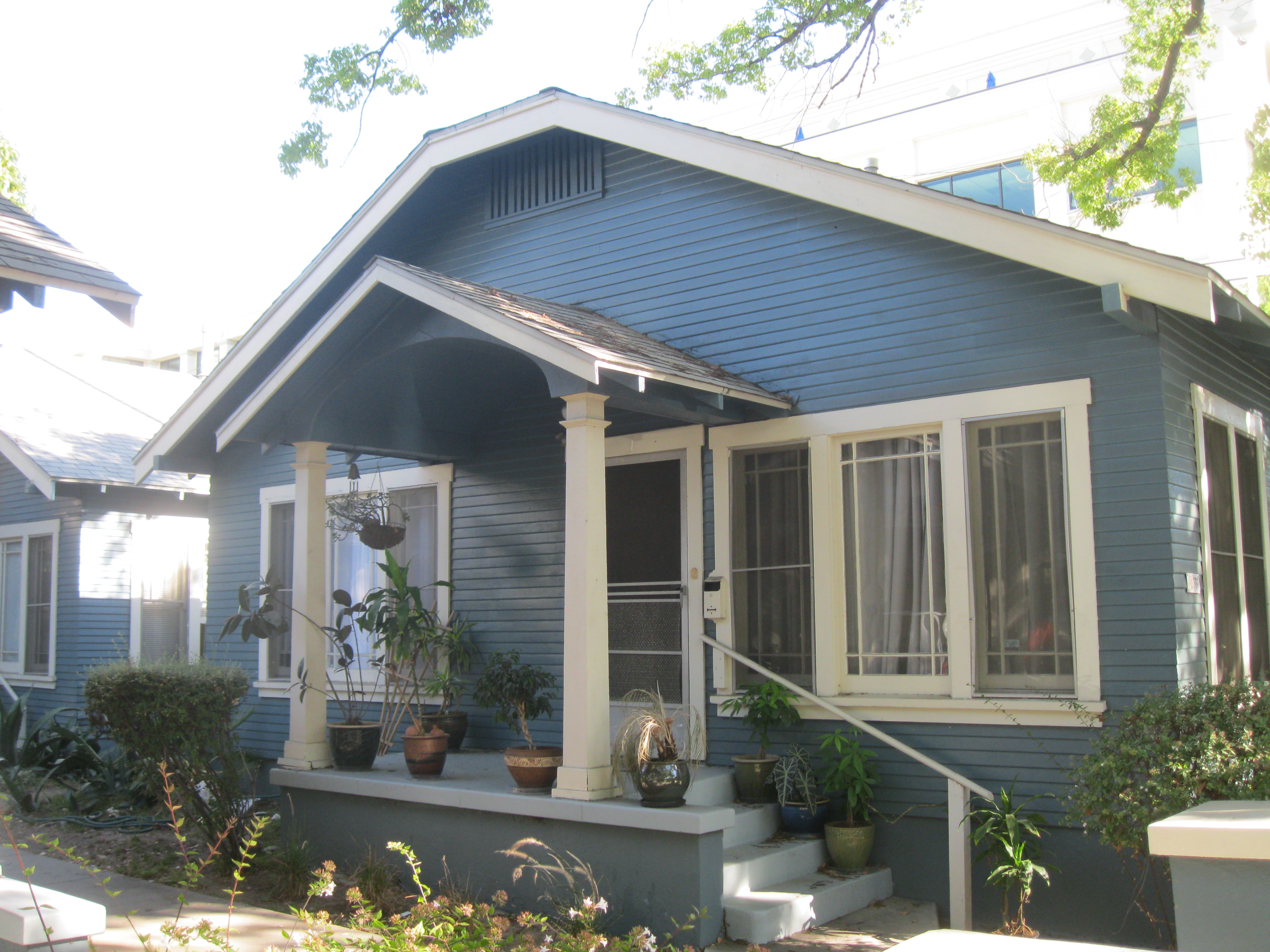
A home in the court
