= Court at 638–650 North Mar Vista Avenue =

- U.S. National Register of Historic Places
- U.S. Historic district
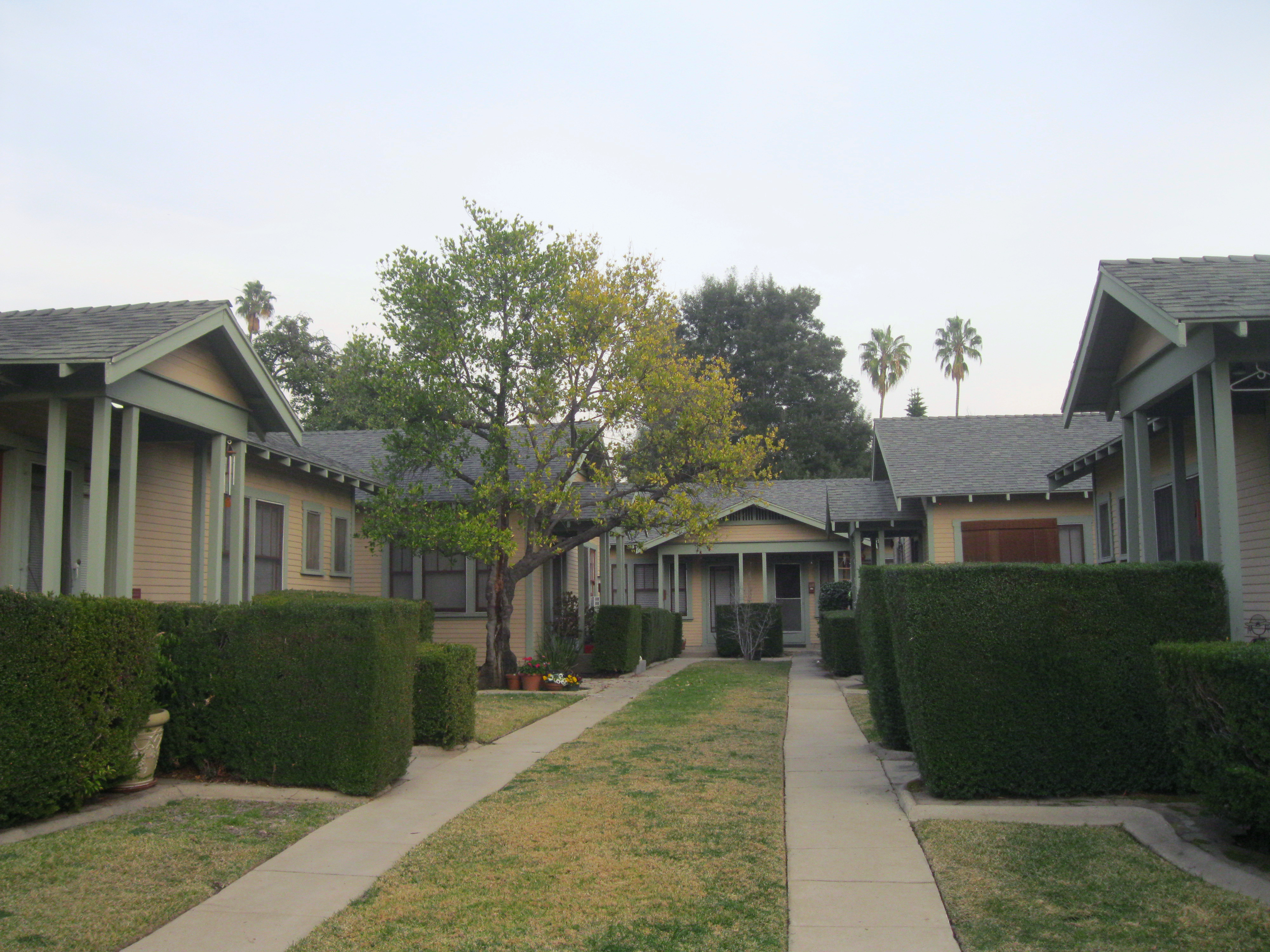

- Location within the Los Angeles metropolitan area Location within California Location within the United States
- Location: 638–650 N. Mar Vista Ave. Pasadena, California
- Coordinates: 34°9′26″N 118°7′35″W
- Area: less than one acre
- Built: 1927
- Built by: Valentine, Karl
- Architectural style: Colonial Revival
- MPS: Bungalow Courts of Pasadena TR
- NRHP reference No.: 94001319
- Added to NRHP: November 15, 1994

The Court at 638–650 North Mar Vista Avenue is a bungalow court located in Pasadena, California. Owner Karl Valentine built the court in 1927. The court consists of four single-family houses arranged alongside a courtyard with a duplex at the rear of the property. The buildings are designed in the Colonial Revival style and feature classical entrance porticos and wide eaves with exposed rafter tails.

The court was added to the National Register of Historic Places on November 15, 1994.

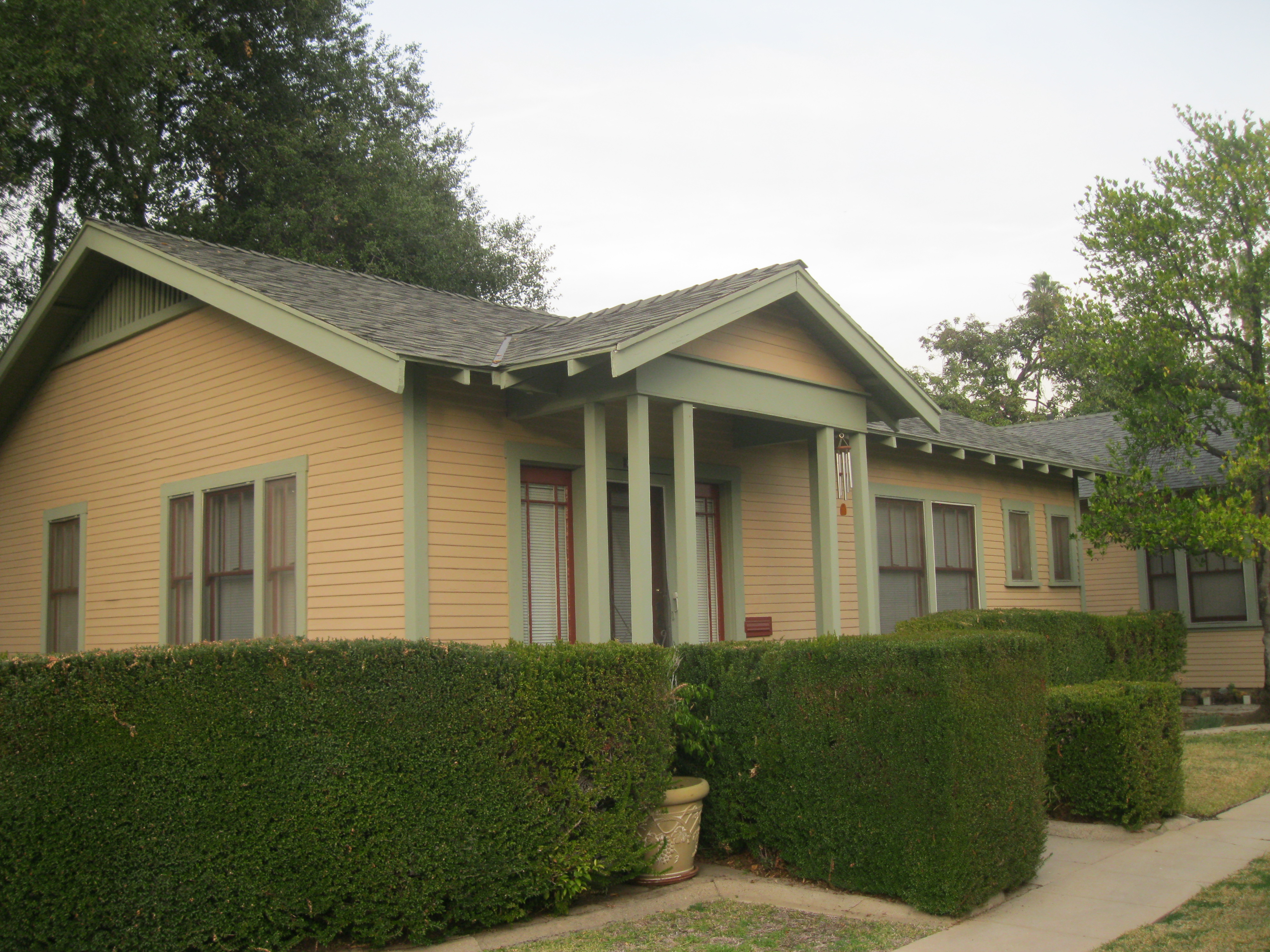
A home in the court
