= Donald Covington =

American architectural historian and professor

- Born: 1928
- Died: 2002 (aged 73–74)
- Occupation: Professor of Design
- Spouse: Karon Covington

Donald Covington (1928–2002), former professor of design in the Art Department of San Diego State University, taught courses in the history of architecture and design. He held an M.A. degree in art from the University of California, Los Angeles.

A Fellow of the Royal Society of Arts, Covington studied at the Attingham School, Shropshire, and the Study Centre of Fine and Decorative Arts, London. A member of the editorial board of the Journal of Interior Design, he conducted research in the history of architecture and the decorative arts.

Covington was an enthusiast of the San Diego North Park neighborhood, as well as a leading expert on the architect David Owen Dryden. Covington was a proponent of the foundation of the Dryden Historic District. From 1991 to 2002, Covington was a volunteer member of the Friends of the Marston House, a San Diego Historical Society museum of the Arts and Crafts.

Covington died in 2002 and is survived by his wife Karon Covington.

== Publications ==
- Covington, Donald Patrick. "Burlingame : the tract of character, 1912-1929 : a community history & self-guided architectural tour" / by Donald Patrick Covington. San Diego, CA : Park Villa Press, 1997. 104 p. : ill., map; 22 cm. ISBN 0-9657837-0-7
- Covington, Donald. "North Park: A San Diego Urban Village, 1896-1946". San Diego, CA. Hon Consulting. Inc. 2007 (posthumous). ISBN 0-9795005-0-8
