= Mary Louise Court =

Historic house in California, United States

- U.S. National Register of Historic Places
- U.S. Historic district
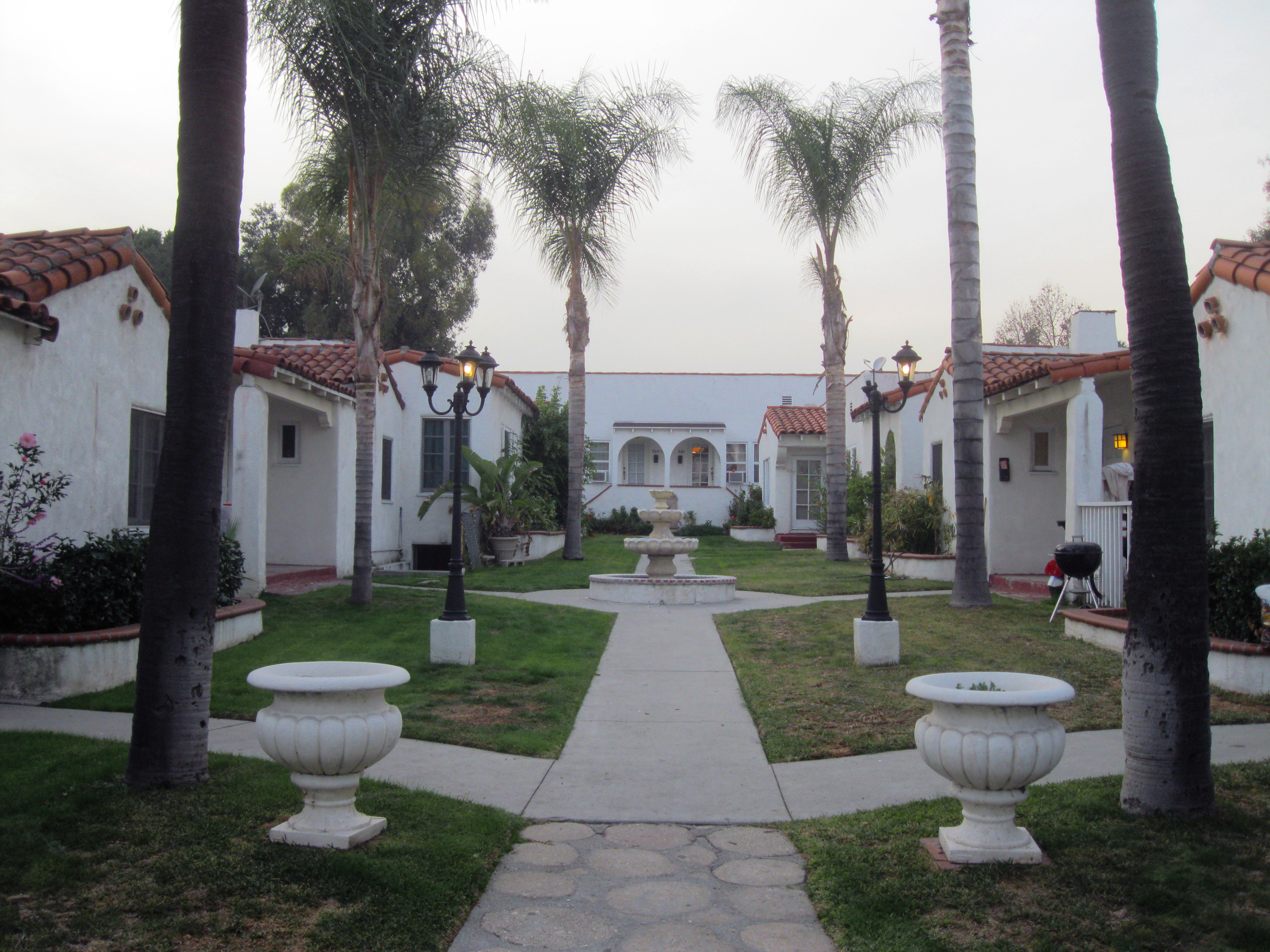

- Location within the Los Angeles metropolitan area Location within California Location within the United States
- Location: 583--599 N. Mentor Ave., Pasadena, California
- Coordinates: 34°9′22″N 118°7′53″W
- Area: less than one acre
- Built: 1928
- Architect: Harris, Robert
- Architectural style: Spanish Colonial Revival
- MPS: Bungalow Courts of Pasadena TR
- NRHP reference No.: 94001318
- Added to NRHP: November 15, 1994

Mary Louise Court is a bungalow court located at 583-599 N. Mentor Ave. in Pasadena, California. Robert Harris built the court in 1928. The court consists of seven buildings surrounding a central pathway; the buildings contain 14 residential units, with four in the rear building, three in each of the two middle buildings, and one each in the front four buildings. The buildings are designed in the Spanish Colonial Revival style and feature stucco exteriors, Spanish tile roofs, open-arched porches, and curved bracketing around the doors. The stone walkway between the homes is lined by palm trees.

The court was added to the National Register of Historic Places on November 15, 1994.
