= Las Casitas Court =

- U.S. National Register of Historic Places
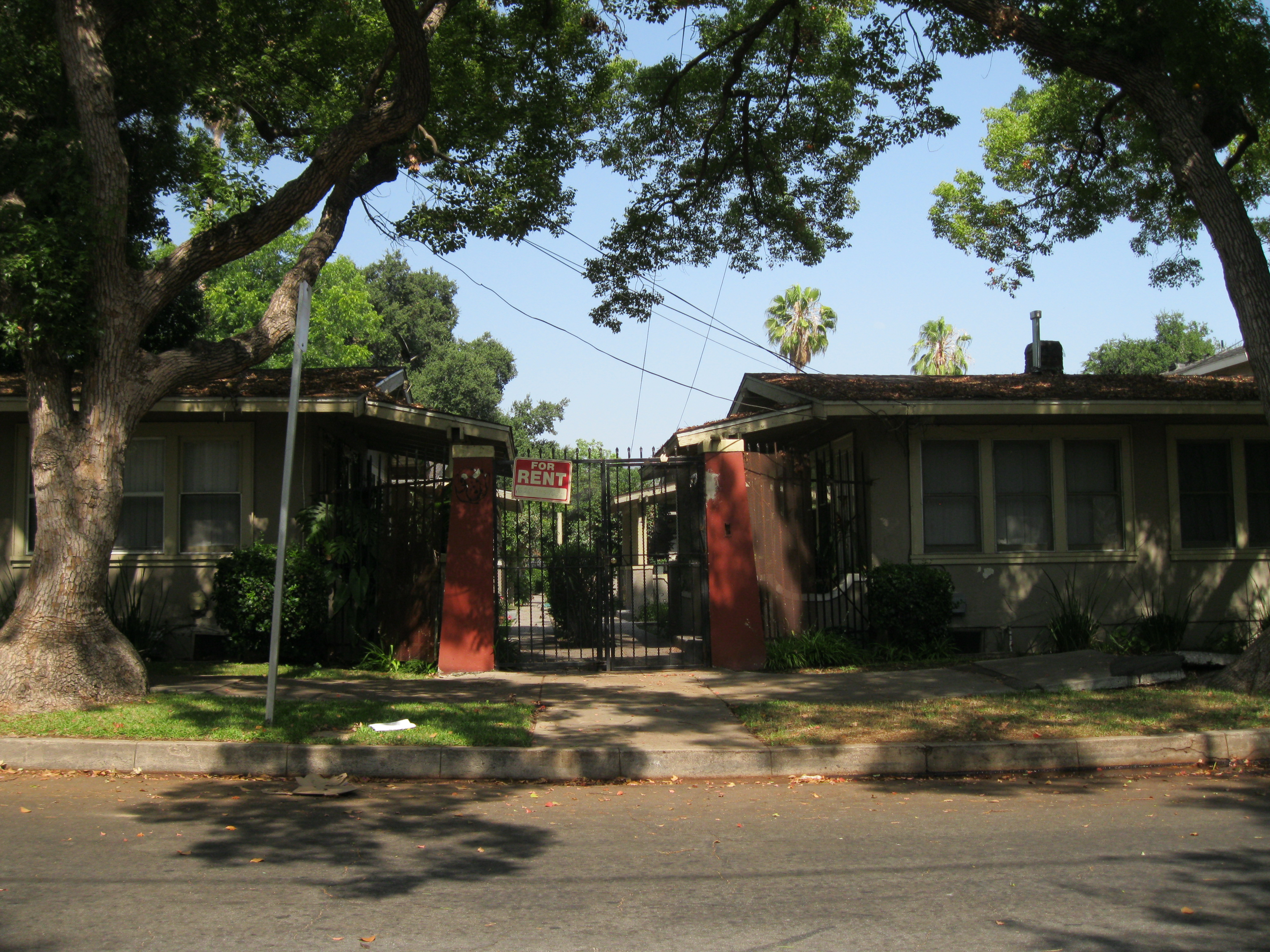

- Location within the Los Angeles metropolitan area Location within California Location within the United States
- Location: 656 N. Summit Ave., Pasadena, California
- Coordinates: 34°9′26″N 118°8′51″W
- Area: 0.4 acres (0.16 ha)
- Built: 1916
- Architectural style: American Craftsman
- MPS: Bungalow Courts of Pasadena TR
- NRHP reference No.: 83001196
- Added to NRHP: July 11, 1983

Las Casitas Court is a bungalow court located at 656 N. Summit Ave. in Pasadena, California. The court, which was built in 1916, consists of ten buildings containing twelve residential units and arranged in two rows; the rows of homes flank a narrow courtyard with two walking paths. The homes in the court were designed in the American Craftsman style, and the court is one of the few surviving Craftsman-styled courts. The first four houses from the street in each row feature gable roofs with wide eaves and porches with shed roofs, while the last two houses have pergolas over their entries. The courtyard includes a torii and decorative boulders.

The court was added to the National Register of Historic Places on July 11, 1983.
