= Haskett Court =

- U.S. National Register of Historic Places
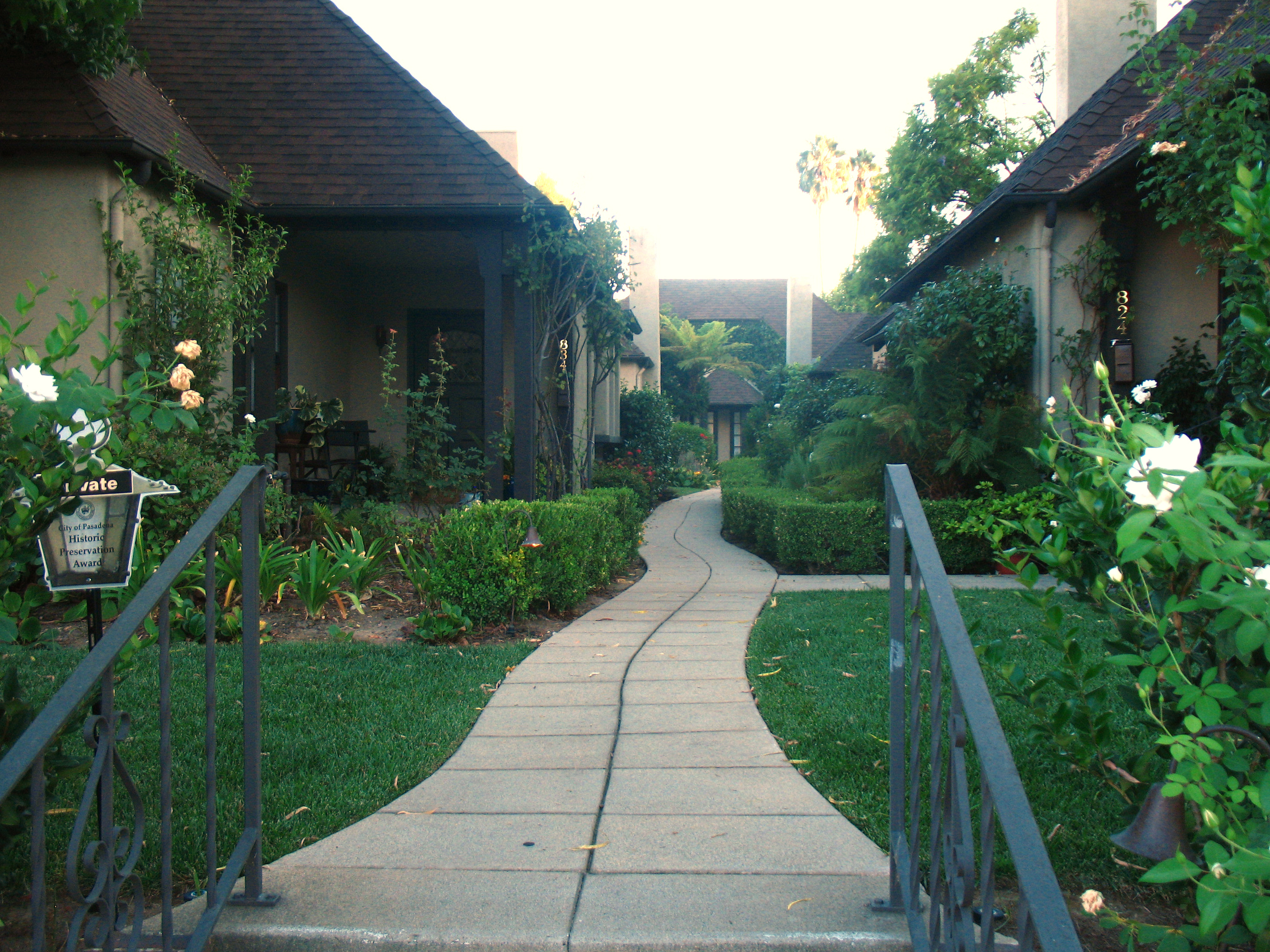

- Location within the Los Angeles metropolitan area Location within California Location within the United States
- Location: 824–834 E. California Blvd., Pasadena, California
- Coordinates: 34°8′9″N 118°7′56″W
- Area: 0 acres (0 ha)
- Built: 1926
- Built by: Haskett, W.B.
- Architect: Ruhe, Charles E.
- NRHP reference No.: 82002195
- Added to NRHP: February 25, 1982

Haskett Court is a bungalow court located at 824–834 E. California Boulevard in Pasadena, California. The court includes five buildings which form a "U" shape around a central walkway; the buildings contain a combined six residential units. Built in 1926, the court was designed by Pasadena architect Charles Ruhe and built by W. B. Haskett, who also lived in one of the homes. The houses in the court were designed to resemble English cottages, and their architecture is similar to the Tudor Revival style. As bungalow courts lost popularity in the 1930s, Haskett Court is one of the later bungalow courts built in Pasadena.

The court was added to the National Register of Historic Places on February 25, 1982.
