= Court at 275 North Chester Avenue =

- U.S. National Register of Historic Places
- U.S. Historic district
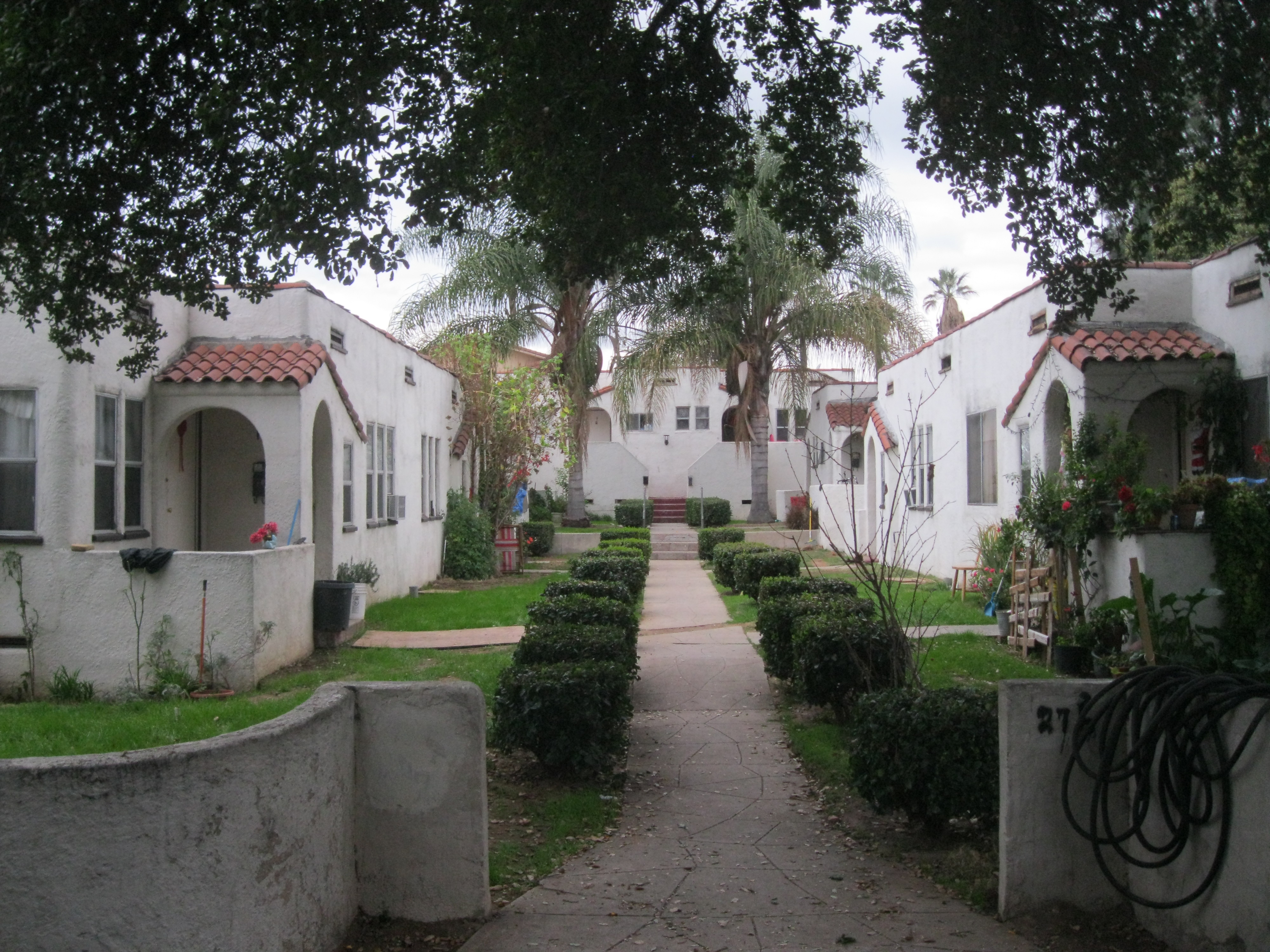

- Location within the Los Angeles metropolitan area Location within California Location within the United States
- Location: 275 N. Chester Ave., Pasadena, California
- Coordinates: 34°9′2″N 118°7′26″W
- Area: less than one acre
- Built: 1928
- Architectural style: Spanish Colonial Revival
- MPS: Bungalow Courts of Pasadena TR
- NRHP reference No.: 94001324
- Added to NRHP: November 15, 1994

The Court at 275 North Chester Avenue is a bungalow court located at 275 North Chester Avenue in Pasadena, California. Owner Fern Parlee built the court in 1928. The court consists of six buildings; five two-unit homes are arranged around a central courtyard, while a single one-unit home is located in a rear corner. The court's layout features multiple tiers separated by steps, an uncommon design for a bungalow court. The houses have a vernacular Spanish-influenced design with stucco walls, clay tile roofs, and wrought iron light fixtures.

The court was added to the National Register of Historic Places on November 15, 1994.
