= Court at 744–756½ S. Marengo Ave. =

- Court
- U.S. National Register of Historic Places
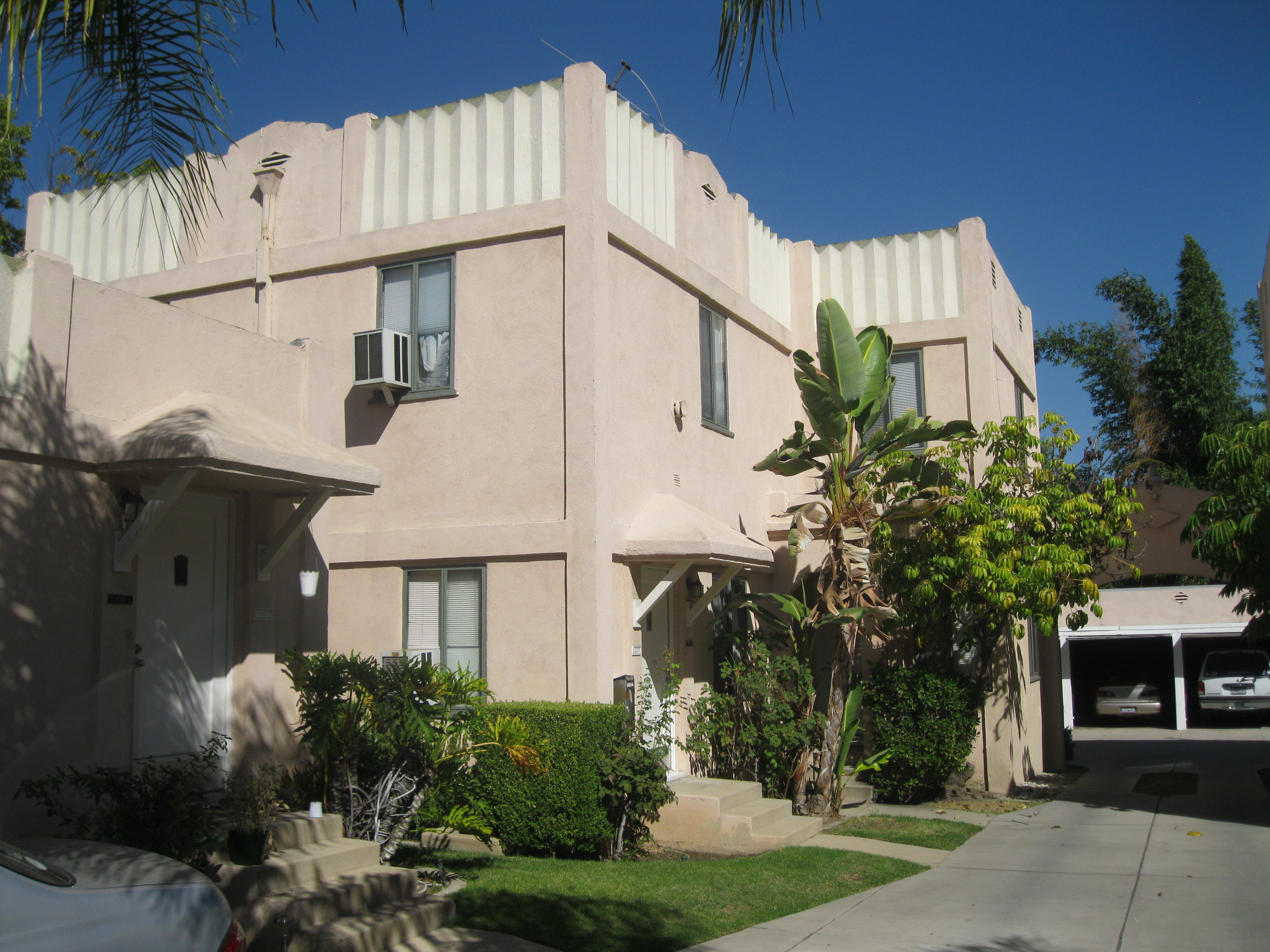
- One of the court's two-story buildings

- Location within the Los Angeles metropolitan area Location within California Location within the United States
- Location: 744-756 1/2 S. Marengo Ave., Pasadena, California
- Coordinates: 34°7′58″N 118°8′40″W
- Area: 0.4 acres (0.16 ha)
- Built: 1931
- Built by: Ringle, D. J.
- Architectural style: Art Deco
- MPS: Bungalow Courts of Pasadena TR
- NRHP reference No.: 83001188
- Added to NRHP: July 11, 1983

The Court at 744-756½ S. Marengo Ave. is a bungalow court located at 744-756½ S. Marengo Ave. in Pasadena, California. The court includes six buildings containing fourteen residential units centered on a driveway. Two of the buildings are two stories tall, while the remainder are one story. Contractor D. J. Ringle built the court in 1931. The homes were designed in the Art Deco style and feature fluted parapets and engaged piers. The court is one of the few Art Deco residential properties in Pasadena and has thus been called "probably the most unusual" bungalow court in the city.

The court was added to the National Register of Historic Places on July 11, 1983.

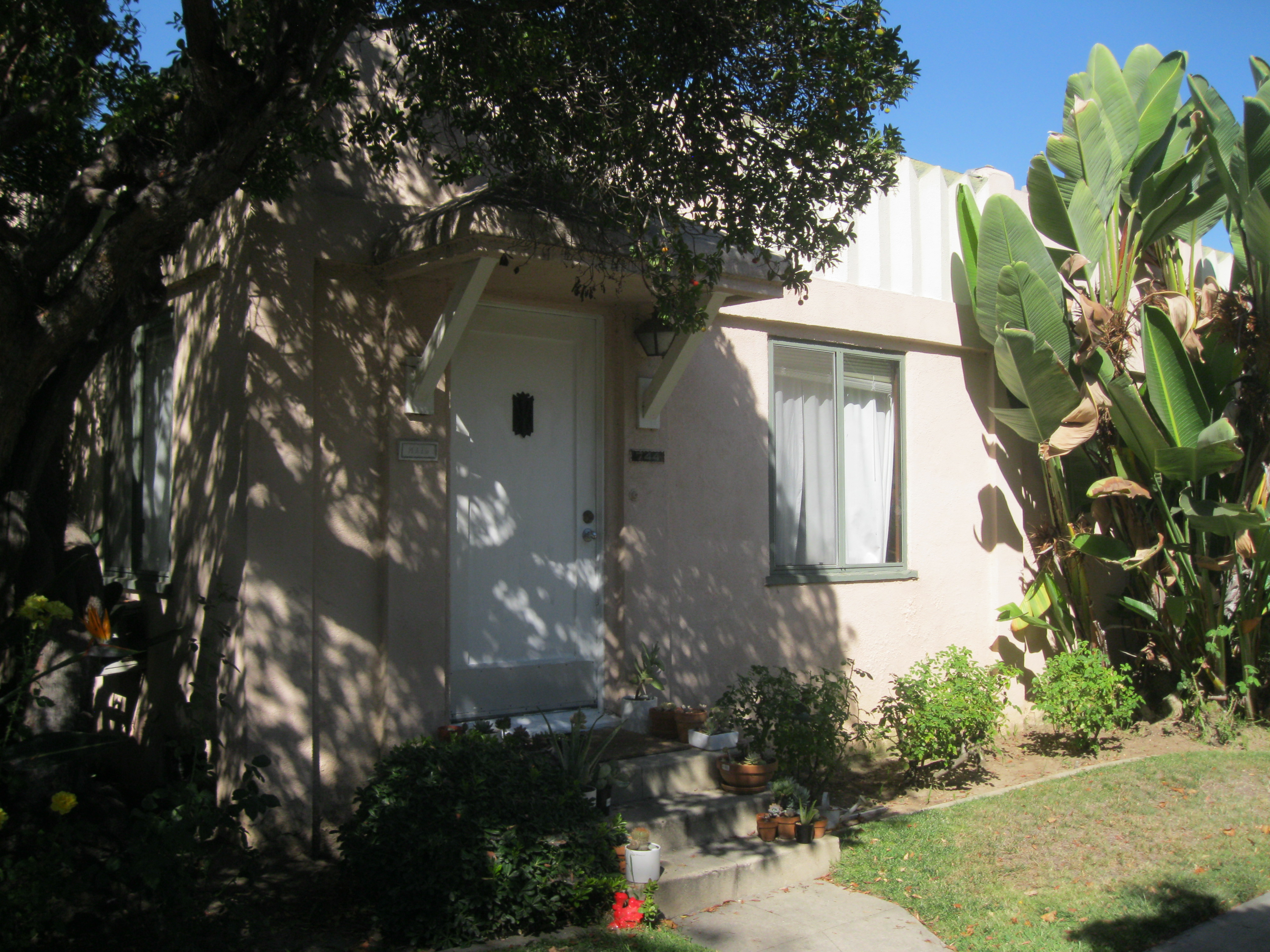
A single-family home in the court
