= 30th Street (San Diego) =

Street in San Diego, California, U.S.

30th Street is a major north–south road in San Diego, California, on the east side of Balboa Park. It connects several of the densest urban communities of downtown San Diego and has a high rate of pedestrian activity. In recent years, 30th Street has become known nationally for its prominent craft beer culture.

== History ==
The original Switzer Canyon trolley bridge, circa 1908

San Diego's first suburbs began appearing in the late 19th century, including South Park in 1870 and North Park in 1893, along with what would eventually become the 30th Street corridor. In 1905, the Bartlett Webster developing company extended streetcar service through South Park, ushering in a period of rapid growth. In 1912, North Park's first high-rise, known today as the Western Dental Building, was built on the corner of 30th Street and University Avenue.

To accommodate transit between these quickly developing neighborhoods, the 30th Street trolley bridge, a wood and steel truss bridge, was built in 1908 across Switzer Canyon. In 1956, the aging original bridge was demolished and replaced in 1957 with the 30th Street causeway which remains to this day.

Between the 1930s and the 1950s, the intersection of 30th Street and University Avenue in North Park was one of San Diego's major city centers. However, as was seen in many urban areas throughout the United States, white flight and suburbanization in the latter half of the 20th century devastated many communities along the 30th Street corridor. The early 2000s have witnessed a resurgence in these historic neighborhoods due to new urbanism. Across its communities, 30th Street has seen many shops, cafes, bars, and restaurants open in the last decade contributing to high rates of pedestrian activity.

== Neighborhoods ==
Running north and south on the east side of Balboa Park, 30th Street connects several dense and historic neighborhoods, including University Heights, Normal Heights, North Park, South Park, Burlingame, and Golden Hill. Throughout these neighborhoods, 30th Street features high levels of pedestrian activity relative to most of San Diego due to its density of cafes, restaurants, bars, and shops. South of the 94 freeway, 30th Street also connects Grant Hill and Logan Heights. In North Park, 30th Street runs alongside the Ray Street Arts District.

The 30th Street trolley bridge also was originally an underpass for a rail line that ran from downtown San Diego to El Cajon, CA. This rail line ran along what is now the first four holes of the Balboa Park Golf Course. This rail line was abandoned in the late 1920s. There was also a rail trestle bridge between Herman Street and 32nd street. The two bridges were filled-in during the same year.

== Craft beer ==
Over the last decade, 30th Street has become well known nationally for its prominent craft beer culture. In 2009, Men's Journal named San Diego the best beer city in the United States and said that "30th Street in North and South Parks is easily the nation's best beer boulevard." The magazine pointed out that San Diego now has more microbreweries than Portland, Oregon, and went on to say that it "is the new beer capital of the U.S." and that "the variety of beers across the city is the most eclectic in the country."

As more microbreweries have opened throughout San Diego county, 30th Street has become the spotlight for the region's craft beer. The neighborhood is home to multiple breweries including Belching Beaver Brewery, Thorn Street Brewery, Modern Times Beer and Mike Hess Brewing. Numerous bars along the street cater to aficionados and specialize in local brews, including Hamilton's Tavern, Toronado, Waypoint Public, Tiger!Tiger!, and Ritual Tavern. 30th Street also hosts or participates in numerous annual events that spotlight craft beer, including San Diego Beer Week and the North Park Festival of the Arts. The street is the namesake of Green Flash Brewing Company's 30th Street Pale Ale.

In 2010, Food & Wine Magazine highlighted 30th Street through North Park and South Park as a top craft beer destination and said that San Diego has "one of the most dynamic beer scenes in America and arguably the world."

== See also ==
- Craft beer
- Breweries of San Diego County
- New Urbanism
- Urban Communities of San Diego
- North Park, San Diego
- South Park, San Diego
