= Switzer Canyon =

Canyon in California

Coordinates: 32°43′59″N 117°7′48″W

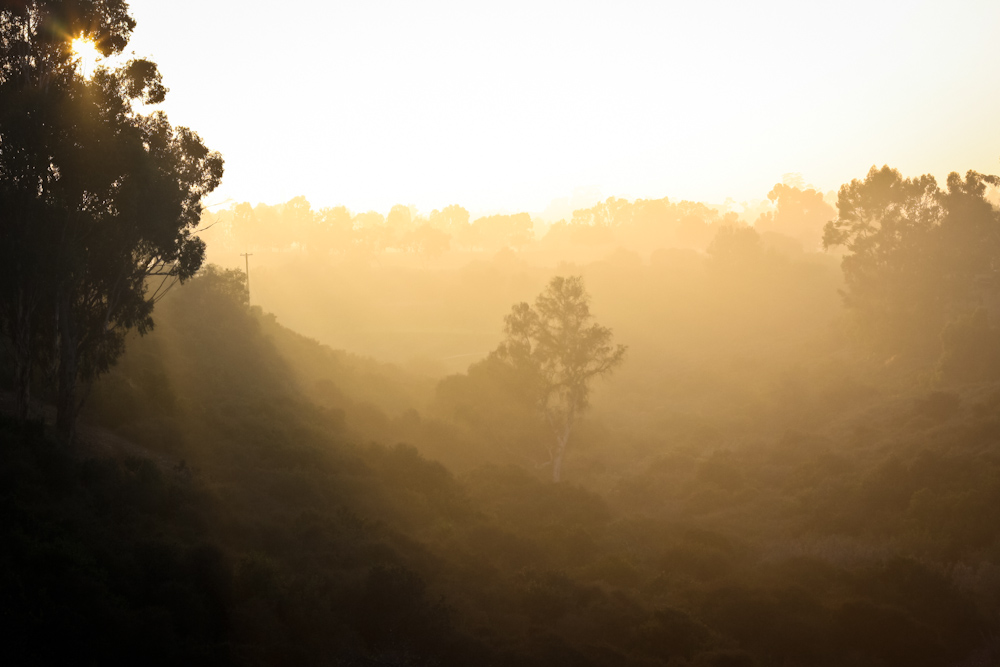
Switzer Canyon viewed from South Park

Switzer Canyon is a canyon in San Diego, California. It is situated to the east of Balboa Park and serves as the boundary between the neighborhoods of North Park and South Park. Switzer Canyon remains an oasis of natural vegetation between some of the city's most urban neighborhoods and is a prime example of San Diego county's unique canyon-laced topography.

== History ==
The original Switzer Canyon trolley bridge, circa 1908

Switzer Canyon was named after E. D. Switzer who moved there in 1869 and occupied a five-acre farm at the downtown extremity of the canyon.

The remoteness from downtown San Diego allowed Switzer canyon to be used as an isolation camp during the city's smallpox scare of 1887. At the bottom of the canyon east of 30th Street was a group of small houses outfitted to receive patients who were afflicted with the disease.

San Diego's first suburbs began appearing in the late 19th century, including South Park in 1870 and North Park in 1893. The development of the area of East San Diego called the "Steiner, Klauber, Choate and Castle Addition", now known as City Heights, was facilitated by a railroad which began service in July 1888. This Park Belt Motor Line ran through Switzer Canyon three times per day. The train was actually a steam-propelled street car with a horse-car hooked on behind.

In 1905, the Bartlett Webster developing company extended streetcar service through South Park, ushering in a period of rapid growth. Also in 1905, North Park's first high-rise, known today as the Western Dental Building, was built on the corner of 30th Street and University Avenue. To accommodate transit between these quickly developing neighborhoods, the 30th Street trolley bridge, a wood and steel truss bridge, was built in 1908.

In 1956, the aging original bridge was demolished and replaced in 1957 with the 30th Street causeway that remains to this day. This causeway was constructed of landfill material that was transferred from Nile Street in North Park, and its poor soil conditions allowed few plants to grow. Since 1957, Switzer Canyon has been divided in half by this fill dirt, except for a drainage tunnel connecting the eastern and western halves.

== Preservation ==
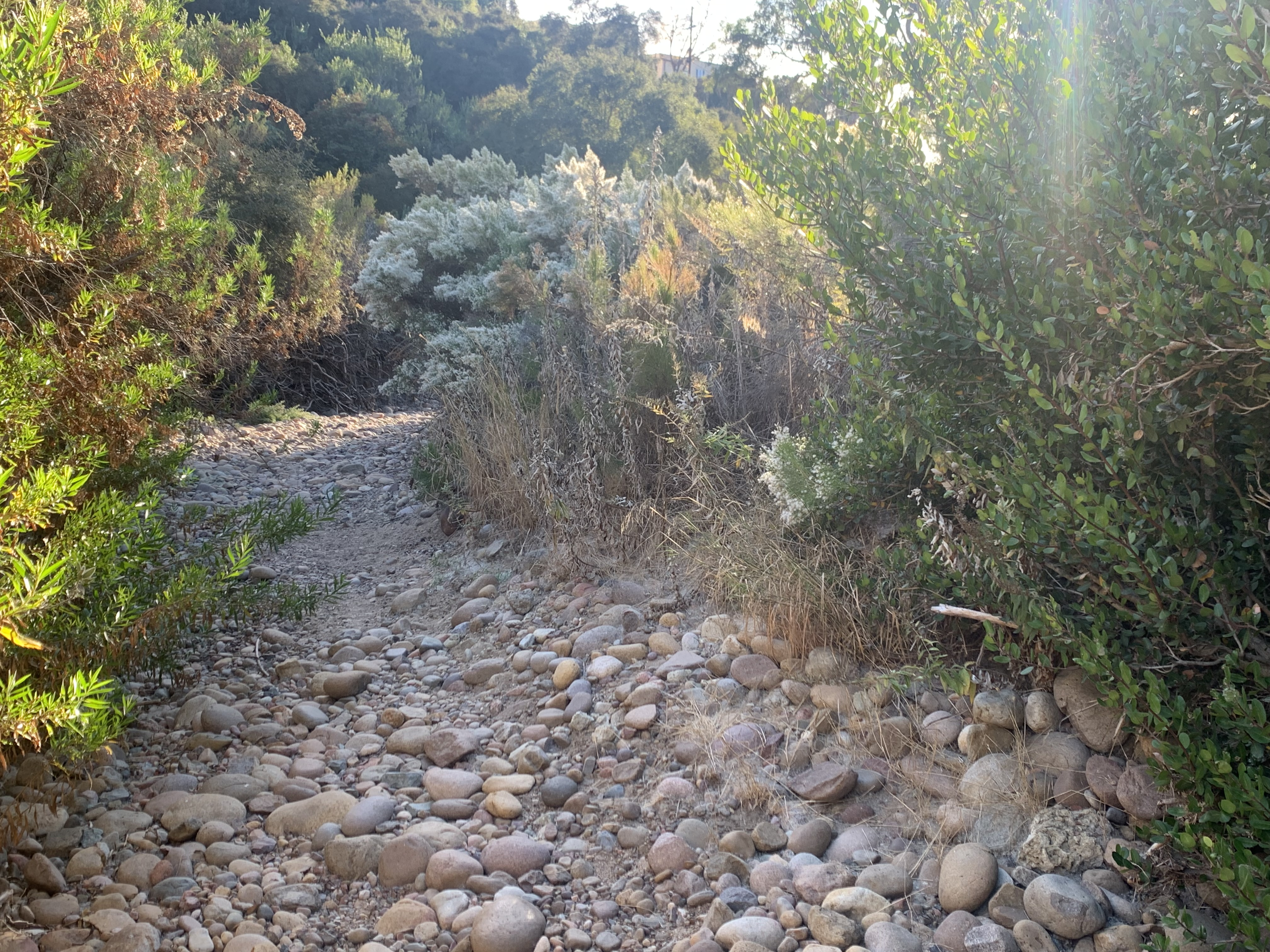
Switzer Canyon West Trail

In the late 1970s and early 1980s, different proposals for developing sections of the canyon were floated before the city council. The Burlingame Homeowners' Association formed in 1980 with a primary objective of canyon preservation. All development proposals eventually failed, and in 1987 Switzer Canyon was purchased as an open space preserve by the city of San Diego.

In 1998, the city planned to build a sewer line maintenance road along the floor of the canyon. A grassroots organization of residents of North Park and South Park teamed up with the Sierra Club to both protect the canyon and rehabilitate its wildlife habitat. The Friends of Switzer Canyon organization became a model for what is now over 40 groups dedicated to canyon preservation in San Diego County, and continues to organize canyon cleanups and invasive species removal events. Between 2000 and 2005, the group installed information kiosks along the trails on the canyon floor, and the western slope of the 30th Street causeway was rehabilitated with native plants that mitigate storm erosion.

Managed by the city of San Diego's parks department, today Switzer Canyon has 2 walking trails and 3 trailheads.

== Wildlife ==
Switzer Canyon is a coastal sage scrub habitat that shelters the threatened California gnatcatcher. It is also home to dusky-footed woodrats, rabbits, coyotes, and numerous indigenous plant species including yerba santa, black sage, and evening primrose.

== See also ==
- 30th Street (San Diego)
- Balboa Park
- North Park, San Diego
- South Park, San Diego
