= Burlingame, San Diego =

Coordinates: 32°43′54″N 117°7′36″W

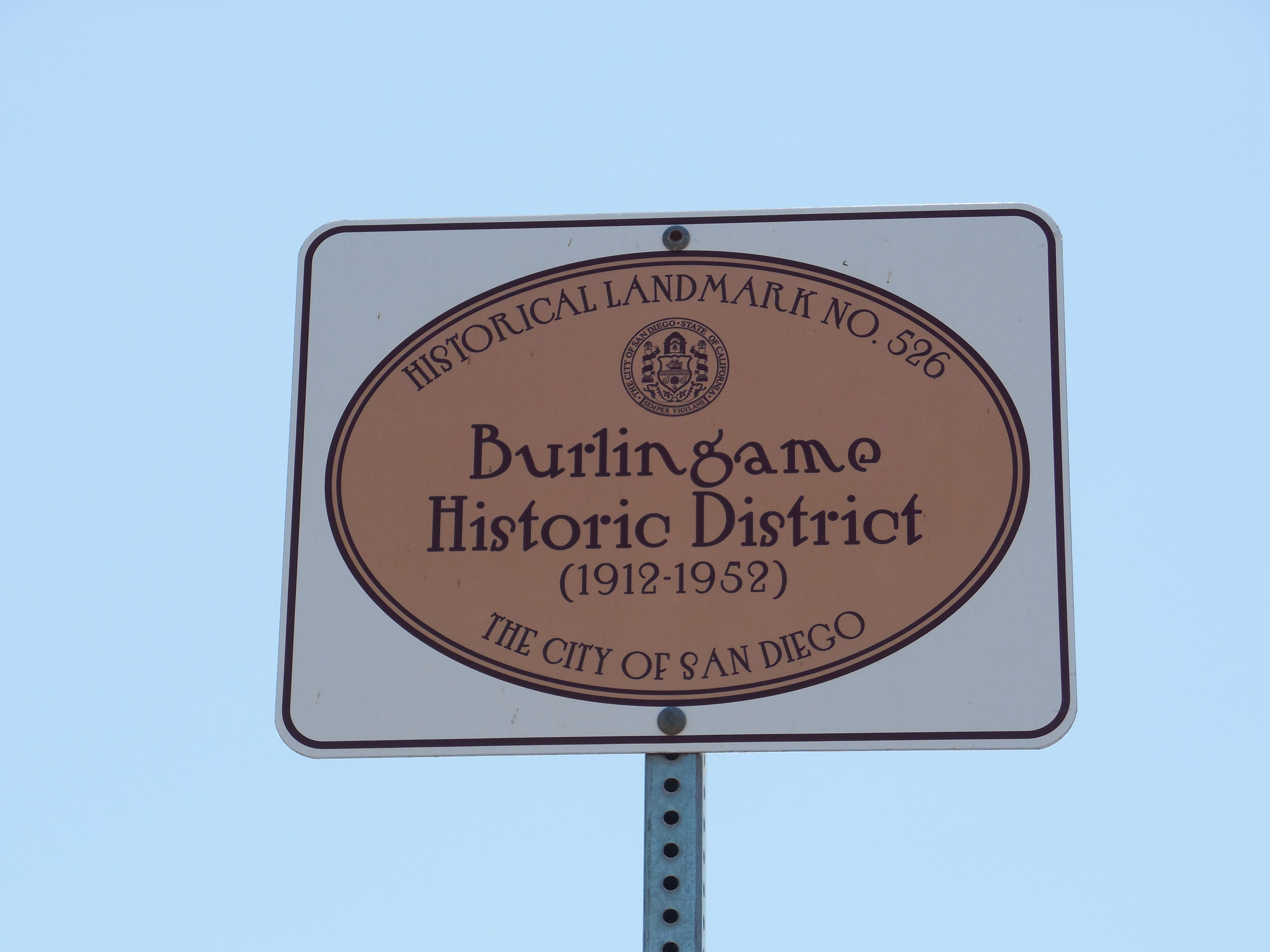
Burlingame Historic District sign

Burlingame is a neighborhood in San Diego, California, United States, bordered by North Park to the north and east, and by South Park to the south, and is located within the boundaries of the Greater North Park Community Planning Area.

Burlingame is a historic district recognized by the City of San Diego for its Craftsman Bungalow, Tudor Revival, Mission Revival, Spanish Colonial Revival, Prairie School, Art Deco and California Ranch architectural styles as well as properties that are hybrids of several styles.

== Gallery ==
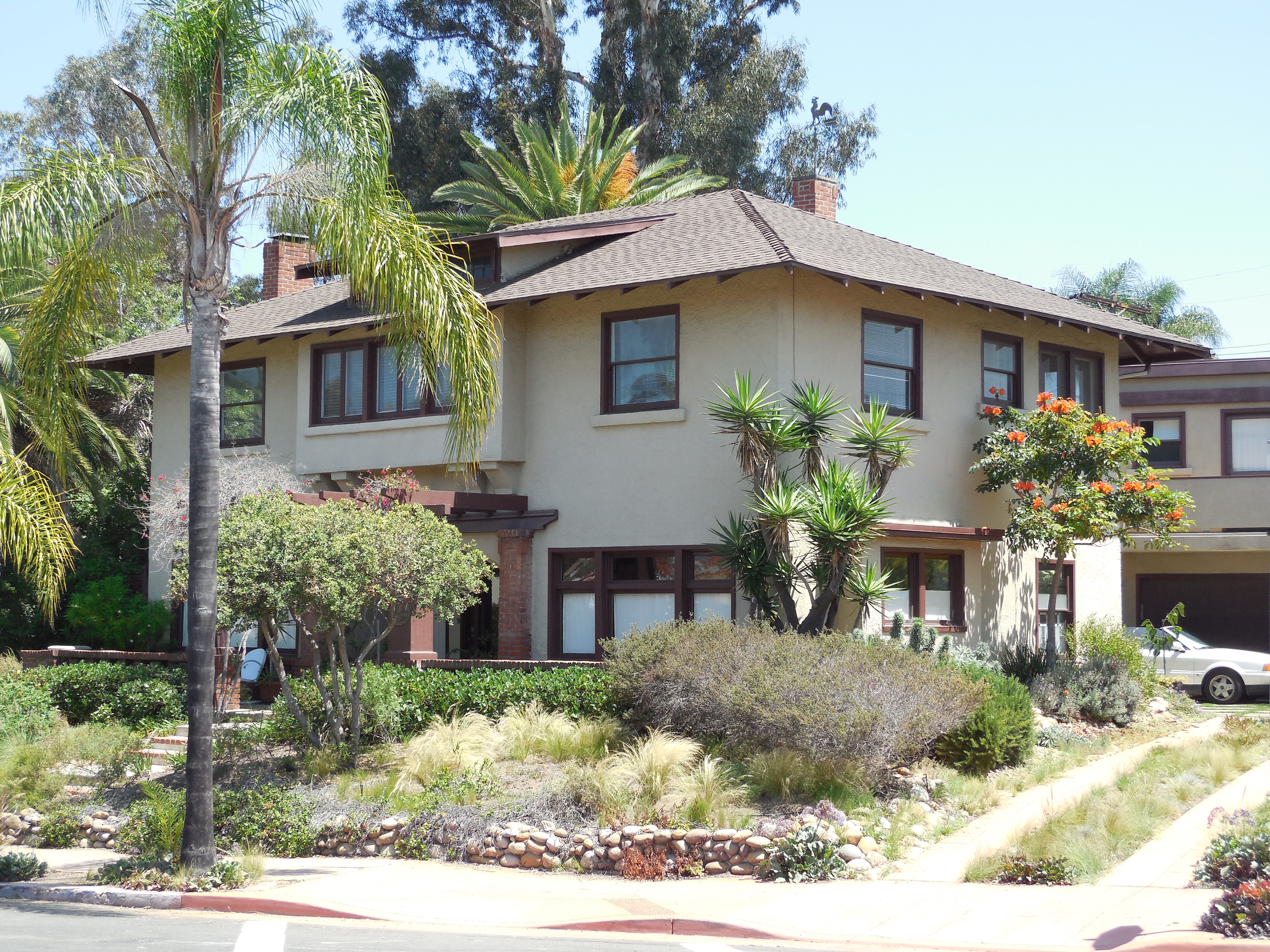
The Wegeforth-Wucher house, City of San Diego historical site no. 163

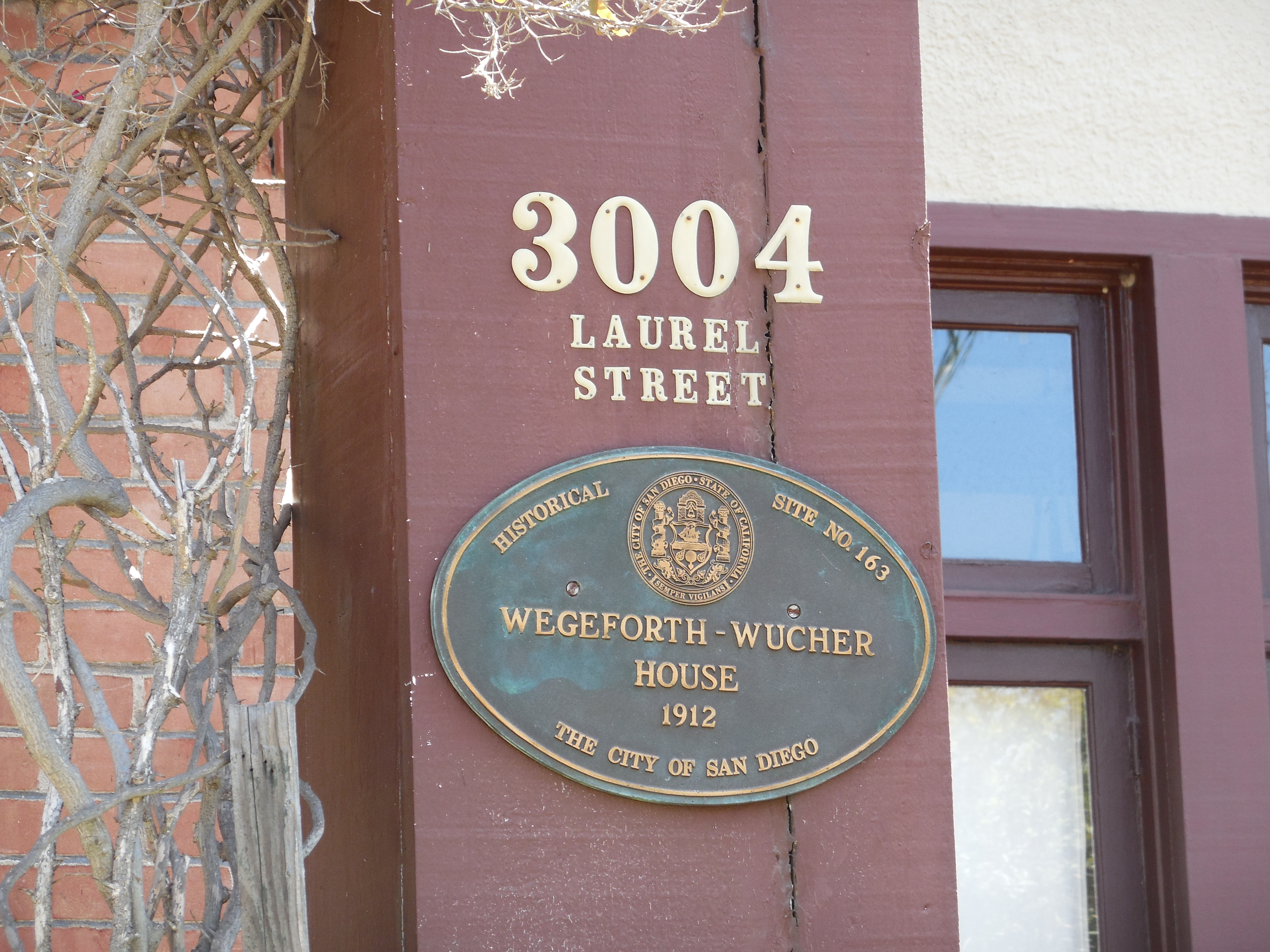
Plaque on the Wegeforth-Wucher house
