= Don Carlos Court =

- U.S. National Register of Historic Places
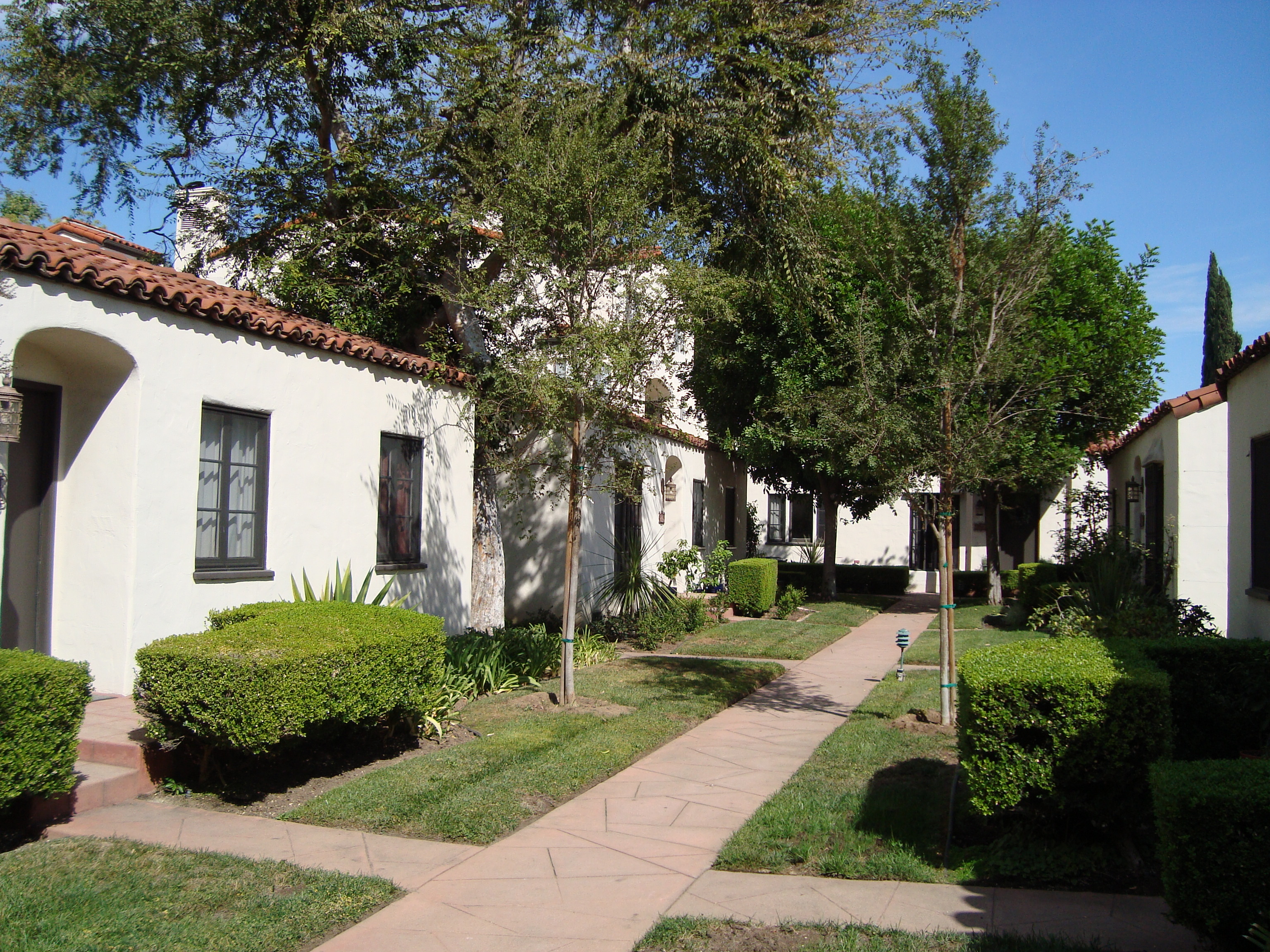

- Location within the Los Angeles metropolitan area Location within California Location within the United States
- Location: 374-386 S. Marengo Ave., Pasadena, California
- Coordinates: 34°8′23″N 118°8′40″W
- Area: 0.4 acres (0.16 ha)
- Built: 1927
- Built by: Burrell, Clarence Hudson
- Architectural style: Spanish Colonial Revival
- MPS: Bungalow Courts of Pasadena TR
- NRHP reference No.: 83001191
- Added to NRHP: July 11, 1983

Don Carlos Court is a bungalow court located at 374–386 S. Marengo Ave. in Pasadena, California. The court contains seven homes built around a central courtyard and walkway. The homes were designed in the Spanish Colonial Revival style and were all built with stucco facades and tiled gable roofs. The courtyard includes a decorative birdbath and planter. Contractor Clarence Hudson Burrell built the court in 1927.

The court was added to the National Register of Historic Places on July 11, 1983.
