= Ray Street Arts District =

District in San Diego

Coordinates: 32.748°N 117.129°W

The Ray Street Arts District is an arts district in the North Park neighborhood of San Diego, California.

== Location ==
The Ray Street Arts District is centered on Ray Street between University Avenue and North Park Way in North Park, San Diego, California, and often includes 30th Street to the west as well.

== Description ==
Ray Street was developed as a commercial district largely in the mid-1930s. As part of downtown North Park, it helped form one of San Diego's largest business districts in the middle of the 20th century, but the latter half of the century brought the white flight and suburbanization that devastated many urban communities in the United States. However, the early 2000s have brought rapid revitalization to the area.

Today, Ray Street is the cultural center of the emerging North Park arts community. It is one of the most culturally rich districts in San Diego and has drawn comparisons to SoHo in New York City. Ray Street is home to many art galleries and studios.

== Ray at Night Art Walk ==
The Ray at Night art walk was San Diego's largest and longest-running monthly art walk. It occurred on the second Saturday of each month. Ray at Night started in 2001 and drew over 1,500 people. It involved over 30 local galleries and businesses.

This event is no longer taking place and is now defunct.

== See also ==
- North Park, San Diego
- 30th Street (San Diego)
