= Lyric Opera San Diego =

Theatre company based in San Diego, California

Lyric Opera San Diego was a San Diego–based theatre company specializing in comic opera, operetta, and musical theatre. The company was founded in 1979, primarily for the purpose of performing Gilbert and Sullivan's Savoy operas. At the time it was known as the San Diego Gilbert and Sullivan Company.

The focus of the company changed in 1990 when Leon Natker was hired as General Director; the artistic director was J. Sherwood "Jack" Montgomery. The company was renamed San Diego Comic Opera. The company expanded its repertoire from Gilbert and Sullivan to include musical theatre, song revue programs, comic operas, and operettas. The mission statement was revised: “To provide a regional model for the production of Comic Opera, Operetta, and Musical Theater that develops new generations of artists and audiences by producing a season of fully mounted productions and education programs.” In 2003 the name was changed again, to Lyric Opera San Diego.

The company was a member of Opera America, the national organization for opera companies. Driven by their commitment to find and develop new talent, the company helped launch the careers of several young San Diego artists, of whom many are now performing on national and international stages. In summer 2006 Lyric Opera San Diego launched its Summer Academy, created to train middle and high school students in the arts of the stage, including acting, singing, dancing and theatre production.

In 2011 the company filed for Chapter 11 bankruptcy, and it has produced no shows since that time.

== North Park Theatre restoration ==
In 2001 the company was offered the opportunity to take part in the restoration of the historic North Park Theatre, located at 2891 University Avenue. Originally built in 1928, this once-thriving 1,200 seat movie theater closed in 1989. After lying vacant for more than 15 years, the North Park community and the Redevelopment Agency of the City of San Diego were undertaking a revitalization campaign for the community. The centerpiece of their plan was the restoration of the North Park Theatre as an 800-seat live performance venue. A 390-space parking garage was also built to accommodate the increased traffic.

Entering into a partnership with developer Bud Fischer, the company embarked on a two-year fundraising campaign to raise $8 million toward the renovation of the theater. In 2003 the final name change was effected and the company became Lyric Opera San Diego, to better reflect its goals, its accomplishments, and its future plans. The fully renovated, state-of-the-art theater opened in October 2005 as The Stephen and Mary Birch North Park Theatre, with Lyric Opera San Diego as its managing tenant. This made the company one of only twelve opera companies in the United States that own or operate their own venues, and the only one in California. However, mortgage and other costs proved an enormous financial strain on the company. Lyric Opera put the property up for sale in January 2011, but was unable to find a buyer. In October 2011 the company filed for Chapter 11 bankruptcy protection. There were no productions in 2012, and as of November 2012 their website offered only advertising links to shows by other companies. The Birch North Park Theatre was still in use for occasional film festivals and musical or theatrical performances. As of October 2013 the web page was a dead link.
