= Crazee Burger =

Restaurant in California

- Location within San Diego Location within California Location within the United States

Restaurant information
- Established: 2006
- Owner: Garrett Bernard
- Food type: Hamburgers
- Location: 3993 30th St, San Diego, CA 92104
- Coordinates: 32.7501°N 117.1299°W
- Website: crazeeburger.com

Crazee Burger, also known as Tioli's Crazee Burger, is a hamburger restaurant in the North Park neighborhood of San Diego, California. It is known for its expansive menu, with burgers of exotic meats.

== History ==
Crazee Burger was founded in 2006 by Wolfgang Peter Schlicht and Lothar Manz, both from Germany, who met in 2005. They both had multiple previous experiences with managing restaurants. The restaurant was featured on "Grabbin' a Sandwich", the eleventh episode of Diners, Drive-Ins and Dives' fourth season, which aired on October 13, 2008. Guy Fieri, the show's host, ate a burger made with alligator meat.

The restaurant was brought under new ownership in 2011. It also opened another location in that year in the Old Town neighborhood. In 2015, the original location moved to another one in the same neighborhood to make way for a housing development.

During the COVID-19 pandemic, the restaurant only offered food for takeout.

== Menu ==
The restaurant's main menu features 16 themed burgers. Chicken, salmon, and turkey burgers are also served. Other foods offered include pastrami on rye, sliders, bratwurst, kielbasa, hot dogs, chicken nuggets, grilled cheese, french fries, onion rings, Caesar salad, Greek salad, various soups, buffalo wings, and milkshakes. Beer and wine are also sold.

There are 12 different exotic burgers: wild boar, bison, water buffalo, alligator, elk, camel, antelope, Santorini (half-beef and half-lamb), venison, ostrich, turducken, and A5 Kobe beef. Each has its own burger build.
