= David Owen Dryden =

American architect

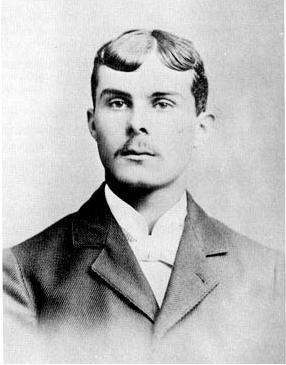
David Owen Dryden

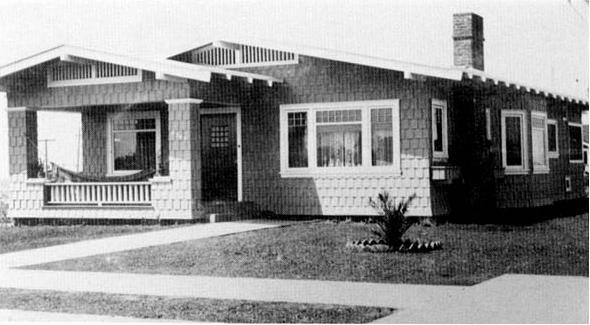
Dryden Home, North Park, San Diego

David Owen Dryden (July 1, 1877 – June 4, 1946) was a renowned San Diego builder-architect best known for his craftsman-style bungalows in the suburbs north of San Diego's Balboa Park including the North Park, Mission Hills and University Heights neighborhoods. Most of Dryden's work was constructed between 1911 and 1919. The Dryden Historic District in North Park contains a high concentration of his homes.

Dryden's homes typify the American Arts and Crafts Movement. 

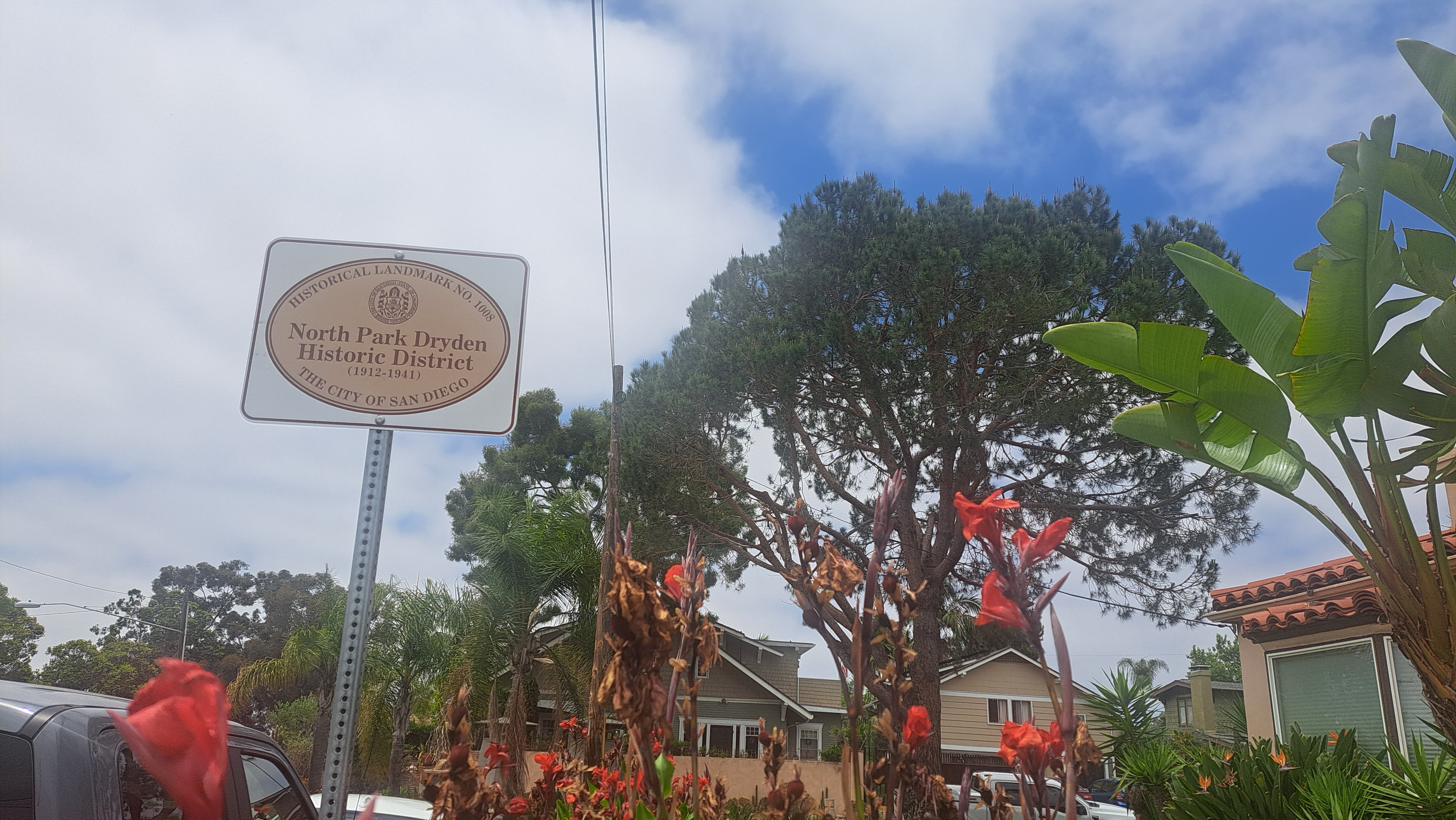
Dryden Historic District Marker #1008

Dryden died on June 4, 1946, in Crescent City, California.

Dryen expert Donald Covington noted "it is a tribute to the quality of his craft that most of David Dryden's houses from his early career in San Diego are extant. Many of them, having survived modernization and change, still grace the old suburban neighborhoods north of Balboa Park echoing the polite and serene lifestyle of a distant era."

== Designs in San Diego ==
- 1912: 3120 Granada Avenue
- 1912: 3039 Palm Street
- 1912: 3136 Granada Avenue
- 1912: *3419 30th Street
- 1912: 3427 Kansas (29th) Street
- 1912: 3532 Ray Street
- 1912: *4505 Del Mar
- 1912: 3524 30th Street
- 1912: 3049 Palm Street
- 1913: 3548 Granada Avenue
- 1913: *3031 Landis Street
- 1913: *3648 Ray Street
- 1913: 2203 Cliff Street
- 1913: 3820 Center Street
- 1913: 4720 Panorama Street
- 1913: 3511 Utah
- 1913: 3634 Utah
- 1914: 2230 Adams Avenue
- 1914: 2242 Adams Avenue
- 1914: 4724 Panorama Street
- 1914: 4780 Panorama Street
- 1914: *4525 Kansas Street
- 1914: 3586 30th Street
- 1914: 3044 Goldsmith
- 1914: 3036 Goldsmith
- 1914: 3136 Goldsmith
- 1914: 3221 Homer
- 1915: 3553 28th Street
- 1915: 3571 28th Street
- 1915: *Ventura Place & Ocean Walk
- 1915: 3546 28th Street
- 1915: 3536 28th Street
- 1915: 1801 Sheridan Street
- 1915: *2042 Albatross Street
- 1916: 3446 28th Street
- 1916: 3516 28th Street
- 1916: 3505 28th Street
- 1916: 3614 28th Street
- 1916: 3712 28th Street
- 1916: 3676 28th Street
- 1916: 1212 Arbor Drive
- 1916: 3554 28th Street
- 1916: Merivale Ave. & Bonnie Brae
- 1917: 3412 28th Street
- 1917: 3503 Pershing Avenue
- 1917: 3575 Pershing Avenue
- 1917: 2710 Landis – remodel
- 1917: 3706 28th Street
- 1917: 3559 Pershing Avenue
- 1917: 3543 Pershing Avenue
- 1917: 3640 28th Street – (remodel)
- 1917: 4244 Jackdaw Street
- 1917: 1612 Grove Street
- 1918: 3527 Pershing Avenue
- 1918: 3367 Granada Avenue
- 1918: 4315 Avalon Drive
- 1918: *1632–35 Ninth Avenue
- 1918: 3511 Pershing Avenue
- 1918: 3728 Pershing Avenue
- 1918: 3388 Granada Avenue

* Non-extant or significantly altered structure.
