= Dryden Historic District (San Diego) =

Coordinates: 32°44′37″N 117°8′3″W

The North Park Dryden Historic District is a historic district in North Park, San Diego, along both 28th and Pershing Streets, bordered to the north by Landis Street and to the south by Upas Street. The community is a neighborhood of early twentieth century American Craftsman bungalows as well as Spanish Colonial Revival homes and California bungalows built in the 1920s and 1930s. It features a high concentration of homes designed and built by the renowned Arts and Crafts era architect/builder David Owen Dryden, a native of the neightborhood.

On 23 June 2011, the San Diego Historical Resources Board (HRB) approved the establishment of the North Park Dryden Historic District. Of the 136 homes in the District, 100 were deemed of historic value. As well as recognising the community's contribution to the city's heritage fabric, the HRB also honoured the work of builder Edward F Bryans - including 15 of the homes in the District - with the designation of Master Builder.

== Gallery ==
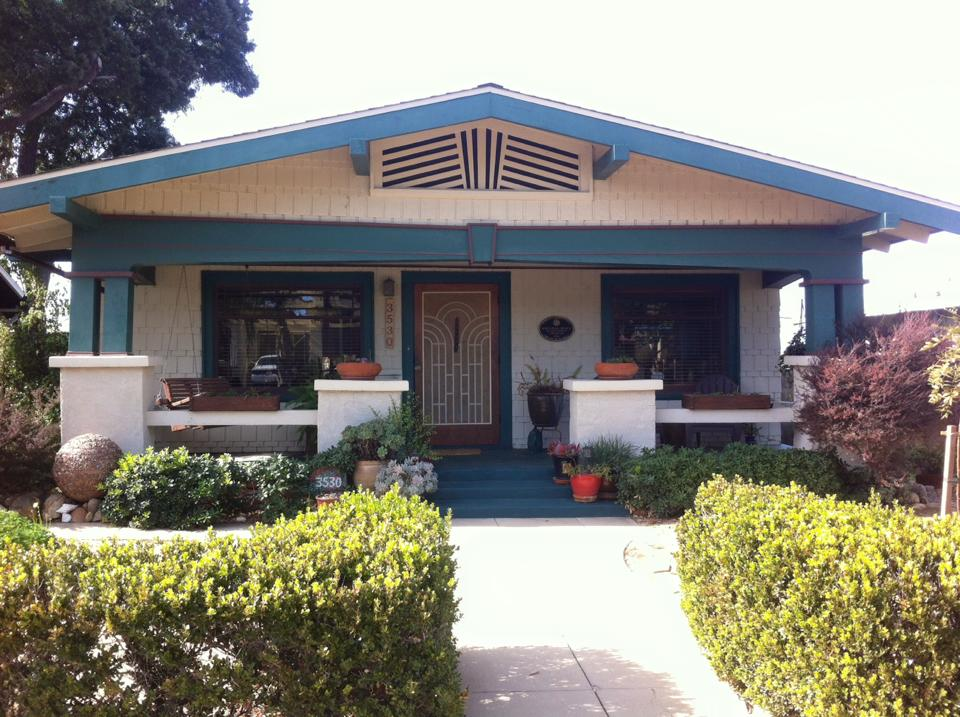
A typical home in the North Park Dryden Historic District.

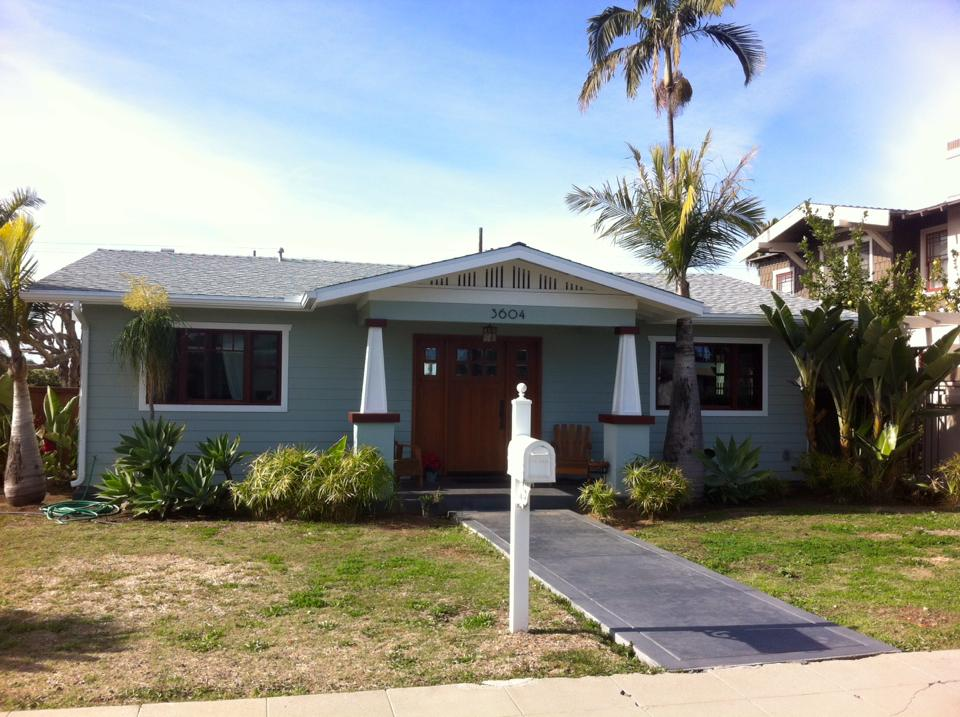
Common features of bungalows in the District include open porches and entryway columns.

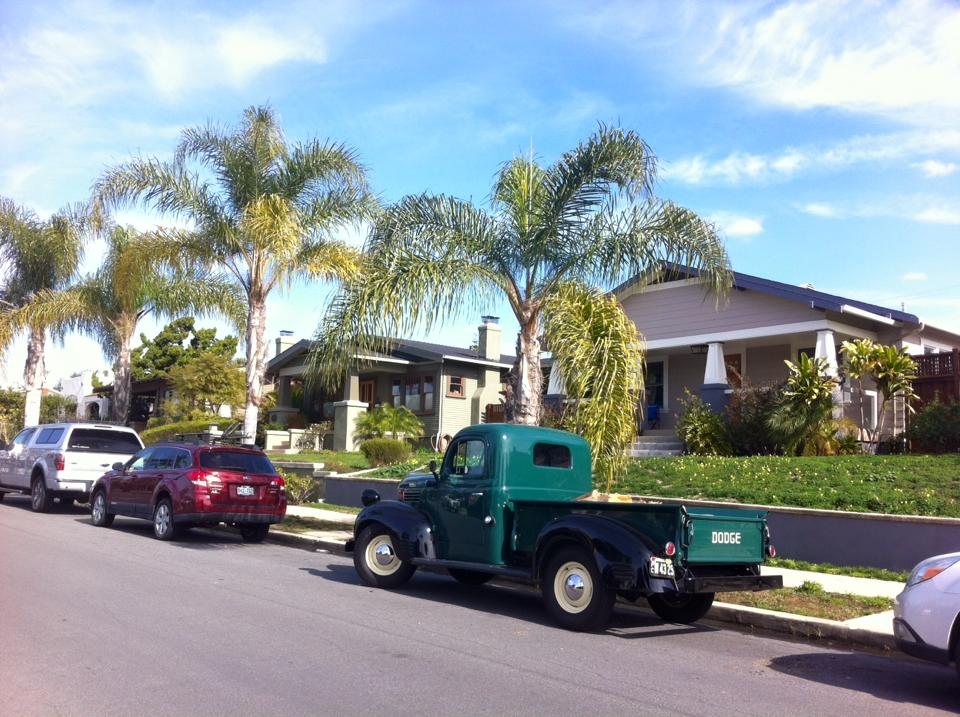
The absence of garages and driveways helps maintain the District's harmonious streetscapes.

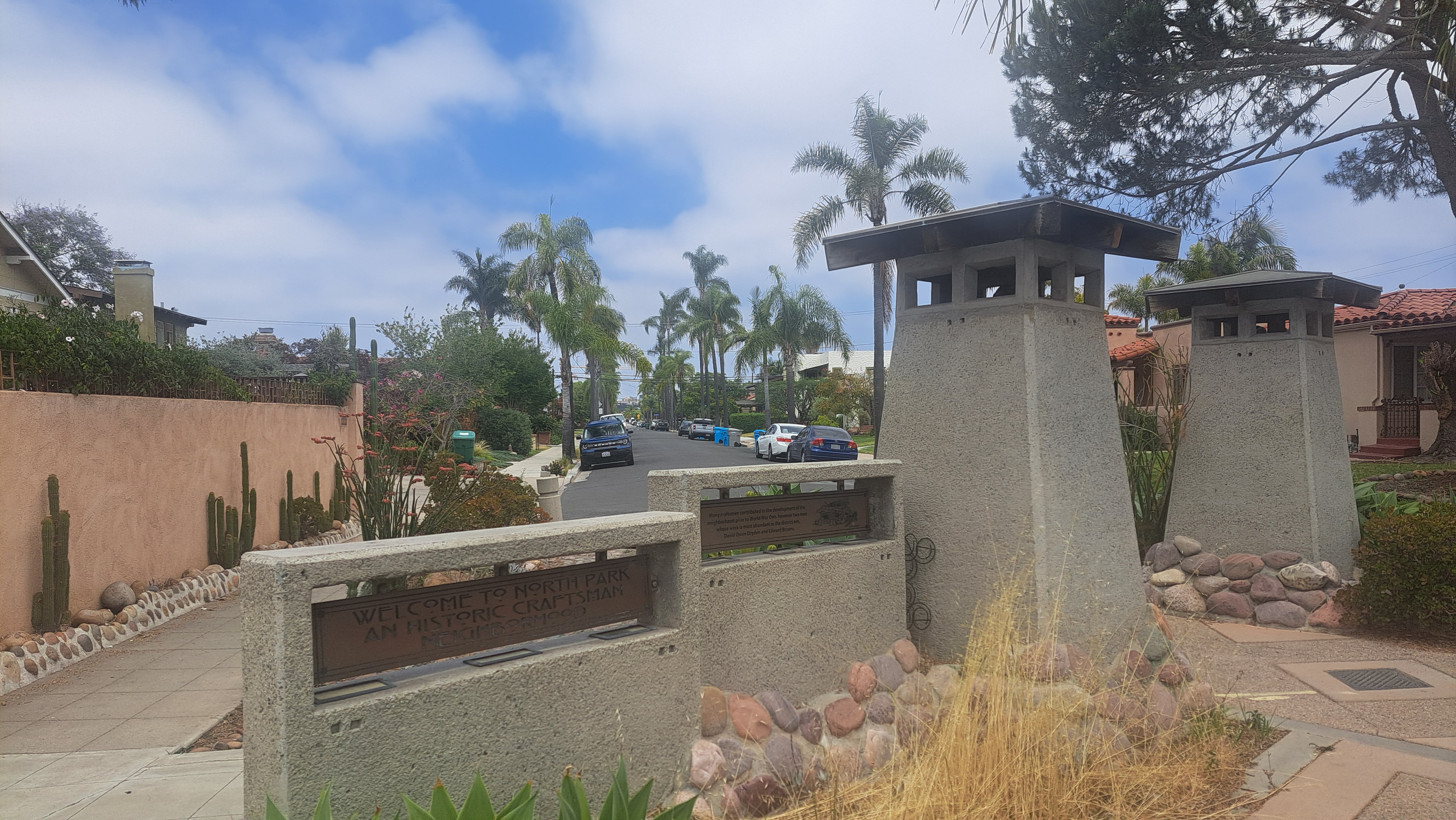
Dryden Historic District Monument at 28th and Upas

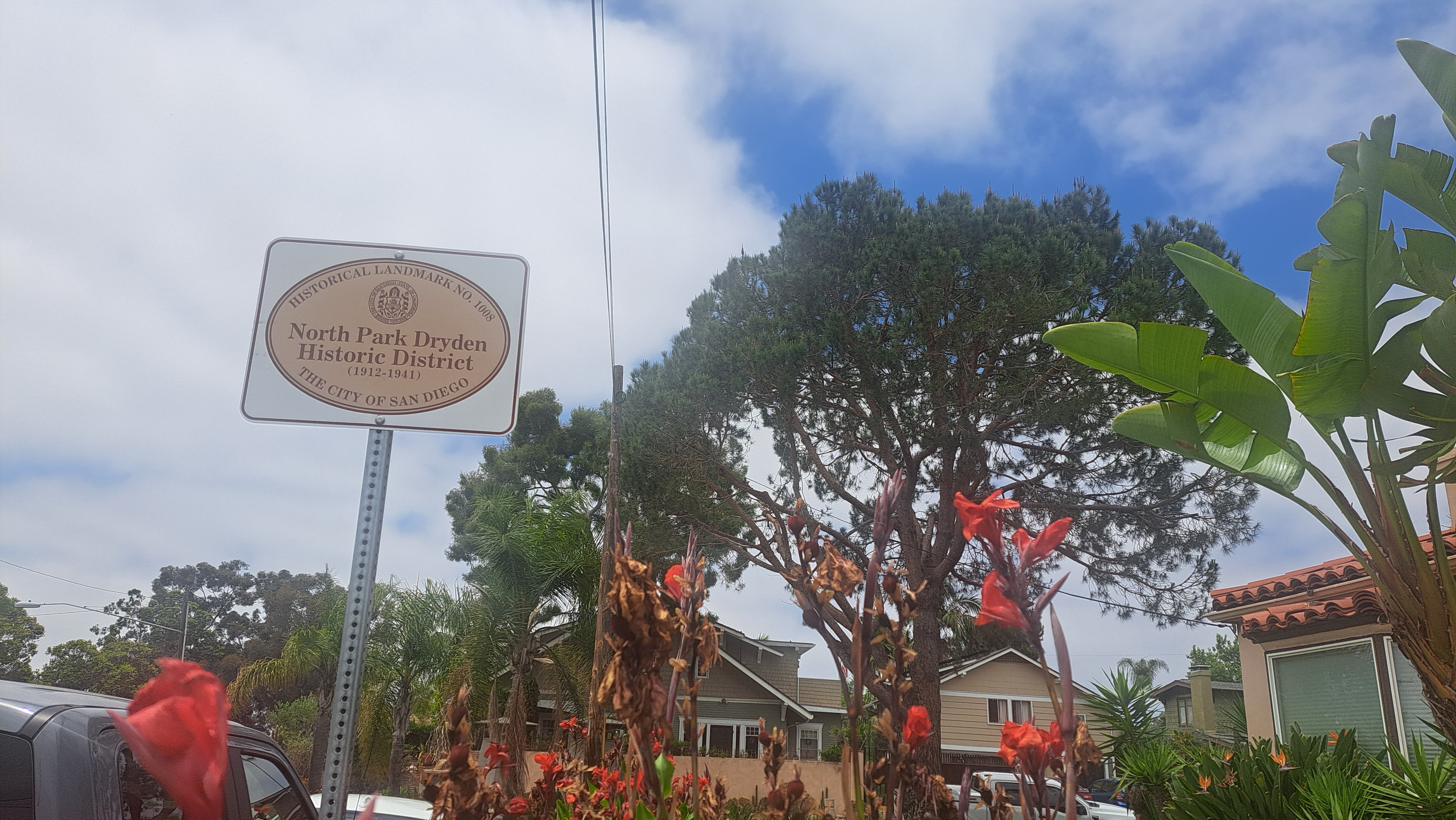
San Diego Historic District Marker #1008

== External sites ==
- Draft District Nomination for the Proposed North Park Dryden Historical District at SanDiego.gov (25 May 2025)
