= South Park, San Diego =

Neighborhood of San Diego, California

Coordinates: 32.721°N 117.128°W

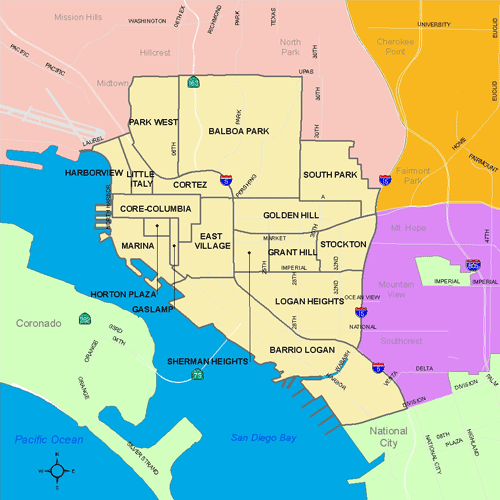
Central portion of San Diego and neighborhood boundaries

South Park is a neighborhood in San Diego, California, adjacent to the southeast corner of Balboa Park. It stands out in San Diego for its tree-lined streets and walkable business district.

Predominantly a single-family residence area with some small apartment buildings and bungalow courts, it is noteworthy for its fine and varied collection of Craftsman and Spanish Colonial Revival style homes built between 1905 and 1930. These include works by Irving Gill, William S. Hebbard, and Richard Requa. In 2017 San Diego designated the area of the original South Park Addition subdivision as the South Park Historic District, recognizing it as one of the best examples of an early 20th century streetcar suburb.

The neighborhood is home to restaurants, cafes, grocery stores, taverns and wine bars, art galleries, the Albert Einstein Academy Charter School, and other local businesses. It is also home to Pathfinders, one of the oldest residential treatment centers for alcoholism in California.

The main roads through South Park, forming its business district, are 30th Street, which was named the nation's best craft beer boulevard by Men's Journal, and Fern St. The neighborhood is dog-friendly and has one of the few designated dog parks adjacent to a residential area in San Diego.

The South Park neighborhood is part of the Golden Hill Community Planning Area. The San Diego Police Department classifies South Park as a Central Division neighborhood bounded by Balboa Park on the west at 28th Street, Juniper Street on the north, A Street on the south, and Juniper Canyon and SR 15 on the east. It includes zip codes 92102 and 92104.

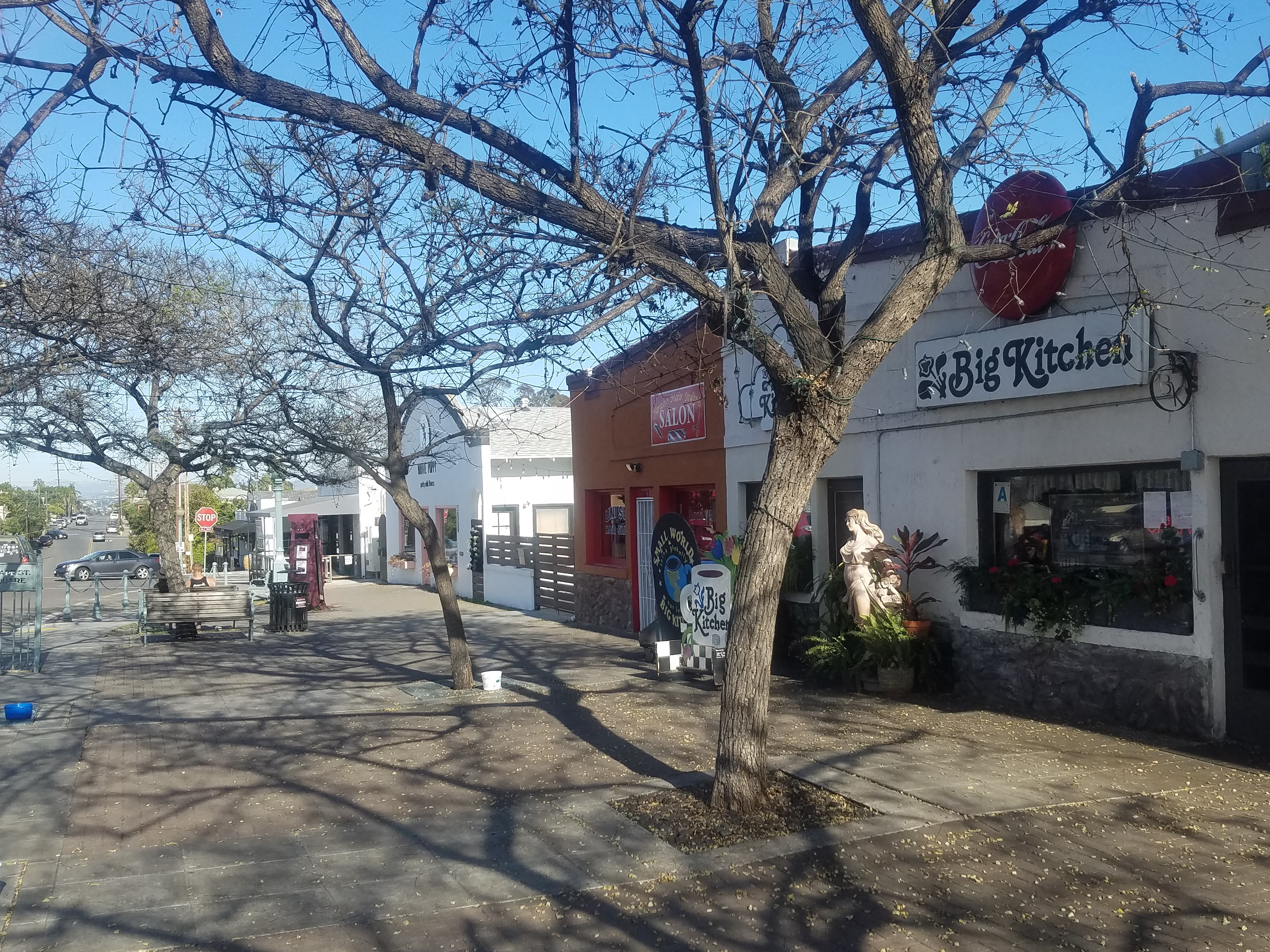
Heart of South Park at Fern St. and Grape St.

== History ==
First registered as a subdivision in 1870, the South Park Addition was too far from downtown San Diego to attract development until its purchase in 1905 by E. Bartlett Webster. The Bartlett Estate Company put in sidewalks, water, sewer, electricity, and other amenities and began selling lots, positioning the neighborhood as a "high-class residential district". Further development was spurred by the 1906 opening of the South Park and East Side Railway, an electric streetcar line linking South Park with downtown San Diego and making South Park the city's first streetcar suburb. In the 1910s, Golden Hill and the area now referred to as South Park became one of the many San Diego neighborhoods connected by the Class 1 streetcars and an extensive San Diego public transit system that was inspired by the Panama–California Exposition of 1915 and built by John D. Spreckels. These streetcars became a fixture of this neighborhood until their retirement in 1949, when the number 2 streetcar was replaced with the number 2 bus.

== Events ==
The Old House Fair is an annual summer community event in South Park, centered on the intersection of 30th Street and Beech Street. Vendors are primarily local businesses selling home furnishings and other items of interest for owners of vintage homes. Musical groups also perform on a stage on Beech Street.

The South Park retail and restaurant community hosts quarterly Walkabouts on Saturday evenings in March, July, October and December. Shops are open late, live music and refreshments are provided, and a free trolley carries attendees from Beech Street to Grape Street to Juniper Street.
