= Bungalow court =

Style of small housing development

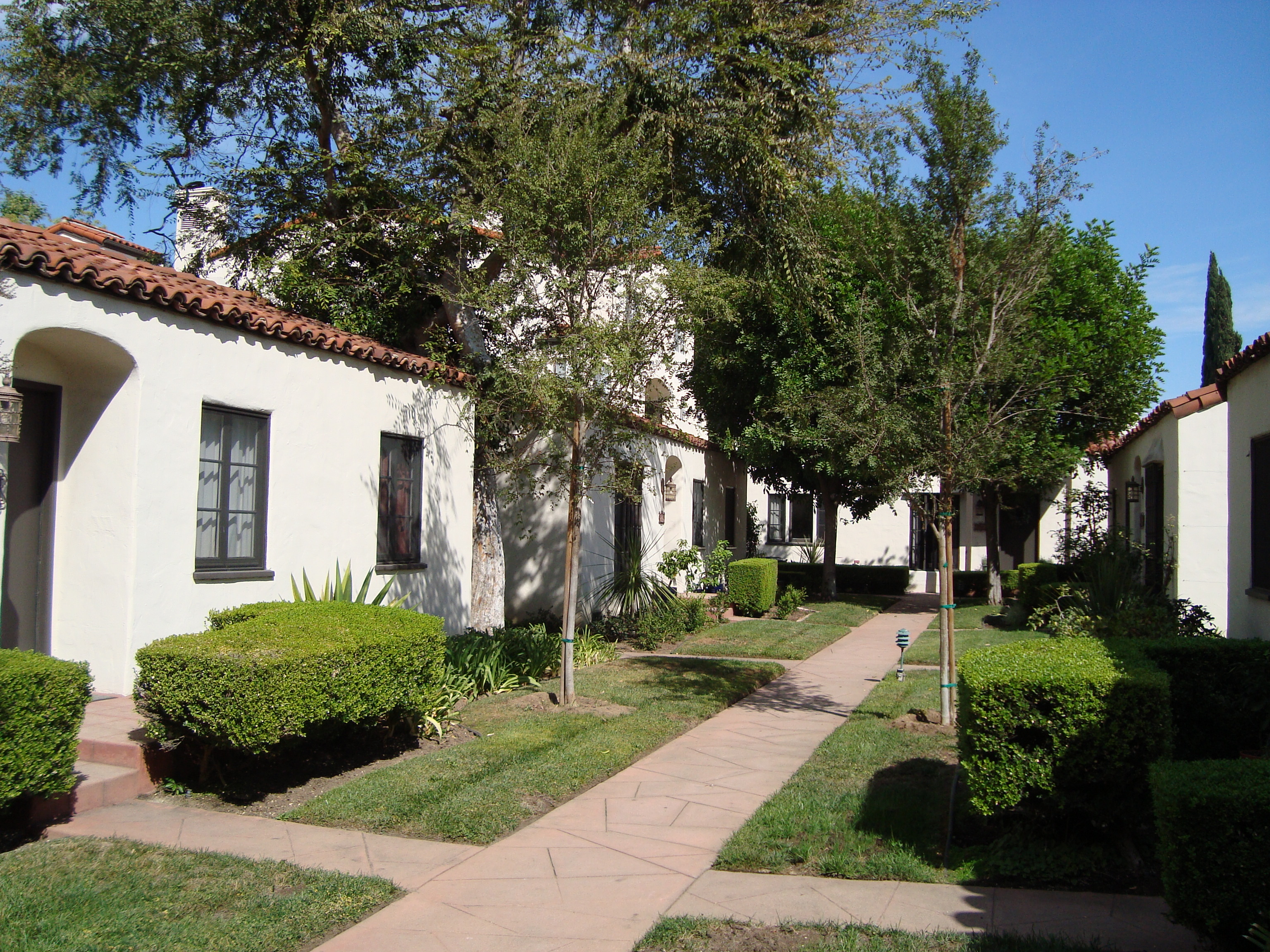
The Don Carlos Court in Pasadena, California

A bungalow court is a style of small housing development which features several small, usually detached houses arranged around a central garden or yard. The bungalow court was created in Pasadena, California, in 1909 and was the predominant form of multi-family housing in Southern California from the 1910s through the 1930s. Homes in bungalow courts were generally small, low-rise (often 1 or 1.5 story) houses in the spirit of bungalow design; however, the homes were designed in a variety of architectural styles, including Swiss chalet and Spanish Colonial Revival. Bungalow courts also integrated their courtyards with the homes, providing green space to homeowners.

Bungalow courts were generally marketed at people who wanted the amenities of a single-family home without its high cost. While each family in a bungalow court had its own house and garden, upkeep and land were shared among the residents.

Bungalow courts were especially popular in Pasadena, the city of their origin. The courts' design prompted the Pasadena City Council to pass regulations requiring all multi-family housing in the city to be centered on a landscaped courtyard. In addition, of the 112 surviving bungalow courts in Pasadena, 43 have a historic designation such as a listing on the National Register of Historic Places. The city is attempting to list the remaining eligible courts due to the design's role in Pasadena history.

The United States has seen renewed interest in bungalow courts with the growing popularity of the missing middle housing concept. The concept focuses on updating zoning codes to permit diverse housing types such as bungalow courts, duplexes, and secondary suites. Many communities throughout the country have responded to this movement by permitting bungalow courts with other diverse housing types.
