= Streetcars in San Diego =

Streetcars in San Diego may refer to:

- San Diego Electric Railway, the former streetcar system
- San Diego Trolley, the modern light rail system in San Diego
