= Middletown, San Diego =

Neighborhood of San Diego, California

Coordinates: 32°44′1″N 117°10′30″W

Middletown is a neighborhood in San Diego, California, located north of Little Italy (downtown San Diego), south of Mission Hills and Hillcrest, east of San Diego International Airport, and west of Bankers Hill. Interstate 5 passes through the neighborhood and the San Diego Trolley has one station in the neighborhood. Harper's Topiary Garden is located in the neighborhood.
