= Harper's Topiary Garden =

Garden in California

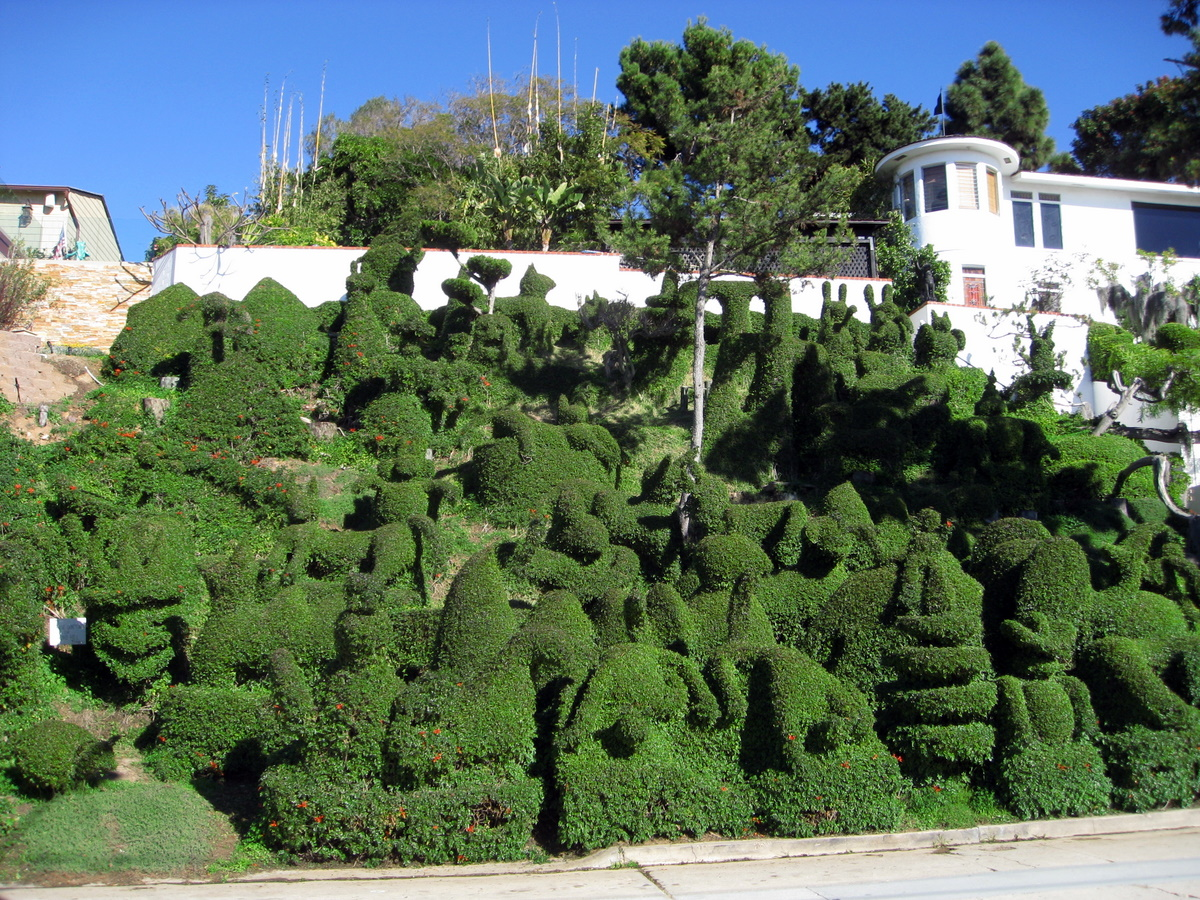
- The garden in 2009

- Location within San Diego Location within California Location within the United States
- Type: Garden
- Location: 3549 Union St, San Diego, CA 92103
- Coordinates: 32.7411°N 117.1759°W
- Created: 1994
- Designer: Edna Harper
- Owner: Harper family
- Plants: 50+

Harper's Topiary Garden is a private garden in the Middletown neighborhood of San Diego, California, containing over 50 plant sculptures that have been used in topiary. All of the plants are trimmed by hand. Entering the garden is prohibited; visitors can only view and photograph the area.

== History ==
The garden was created in 1994, by Edna Harper from the Mission Hills neighborhood of the city. She started it after she saw a Cape honeysuckle that had moved into their yard from a neighbor's garden. Edna envisioned turning the plant's vines into elephants, inspired by the travels she and her husband, Alex, had gone on. Alex, originally disagreed with the idea, but eventually caved in, paying for the water and the gardener, Pedro Duran. Edna spends 3–4 hours daily working on the garden and is helped by Alex, who tends to the taller figures. Duran also assists daily.
