= Shirley Ann Place =

Coordinates: 32°45′36″N 117°8′22″W

Shirley Ann Place is a one-block-long street in the University Heights neighborhood of San Diego, California. The block, between Madison Ave. and Monroe Ave. and west of Texas Street, was designated the Shirley Ann Place Historic District by the City of San Diego for its 1920s Spanish Colonial Revival bungalows.

The district also includes three properties similar in style and that were part of the original development:

- Two additional bungalows on the south side of Monroe Avenue
- A small local grocery store at the SE corner of Madison Ave. and Shirley Ann Pl.

== Gallery ==
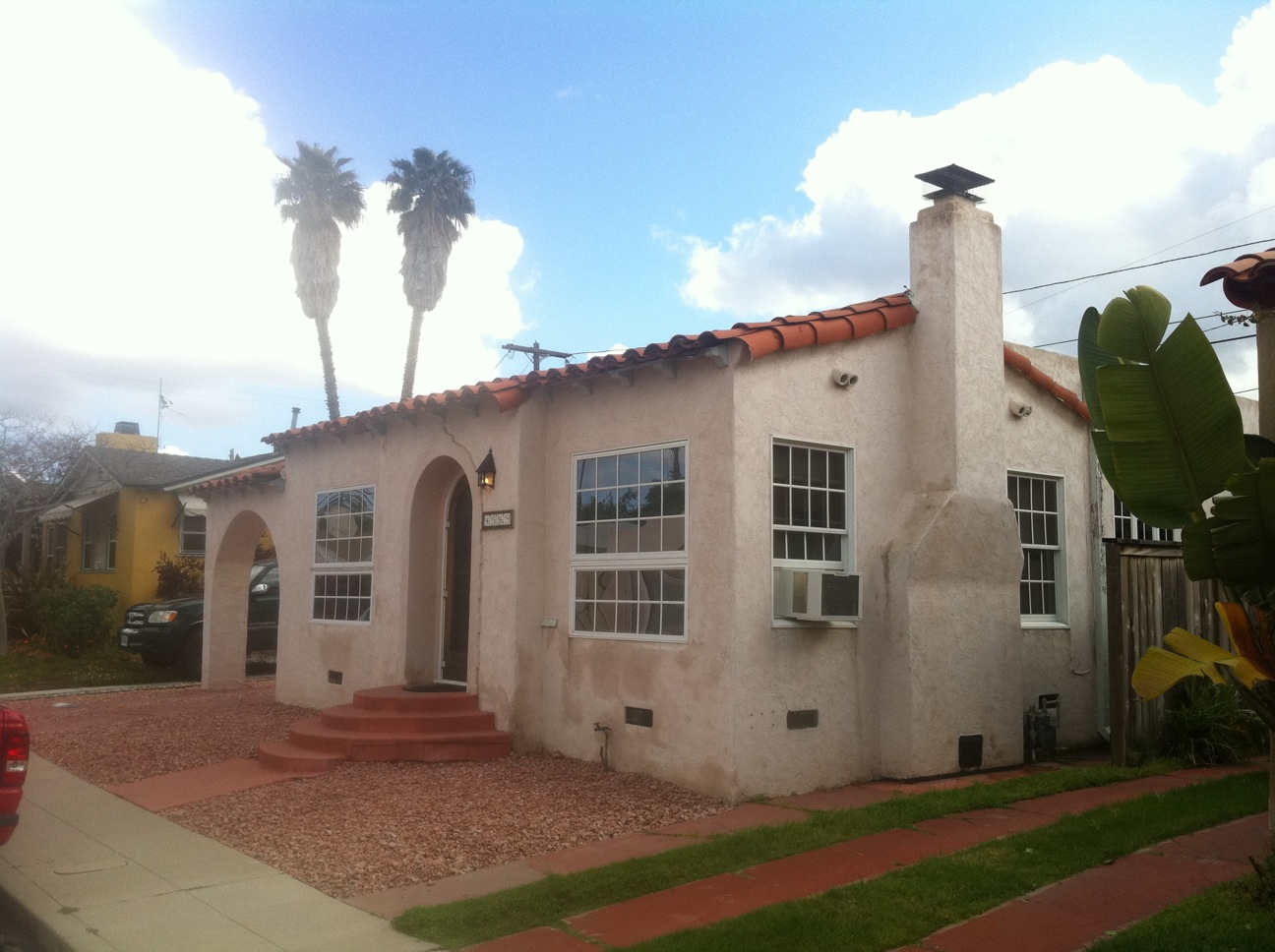

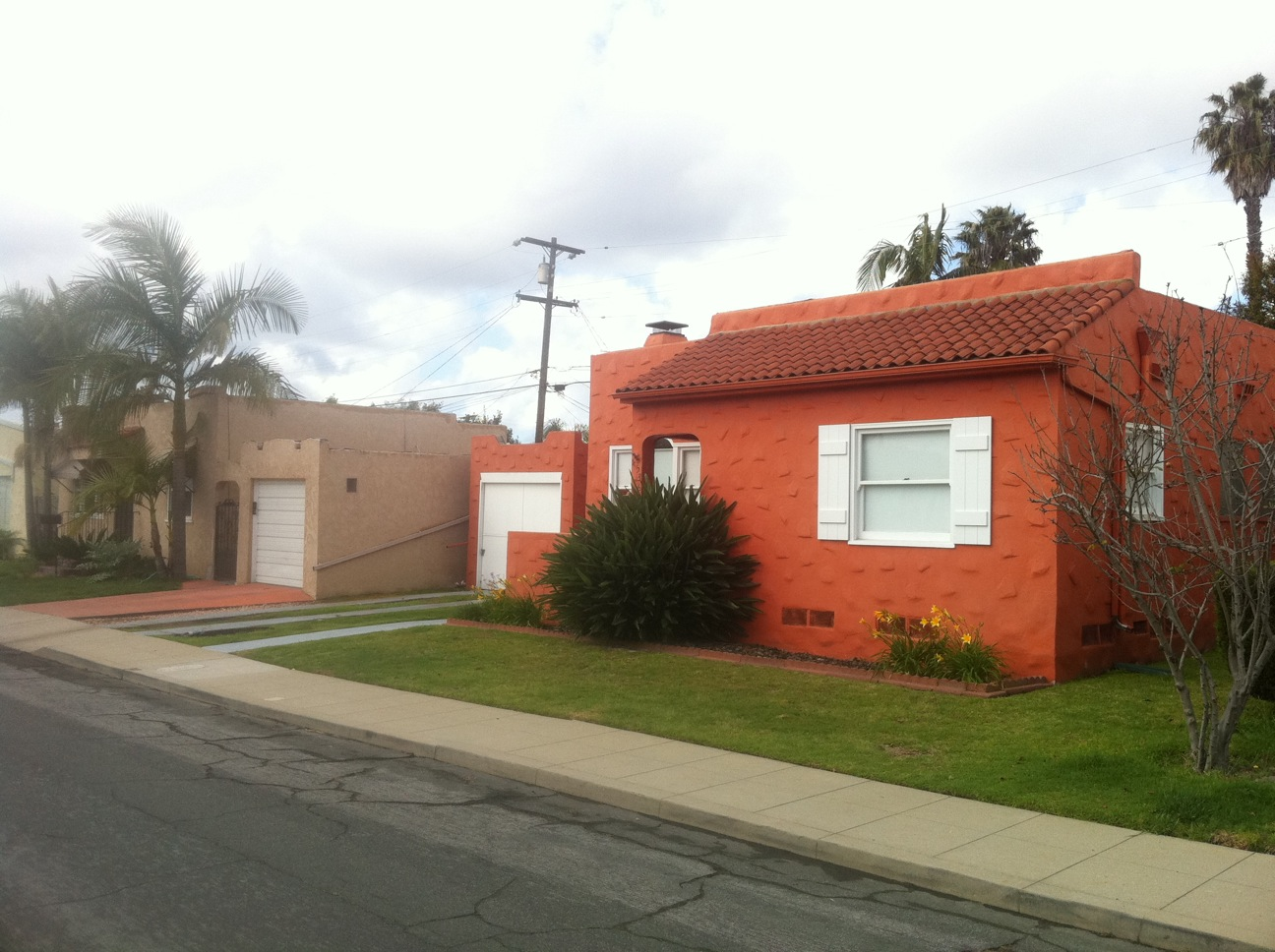

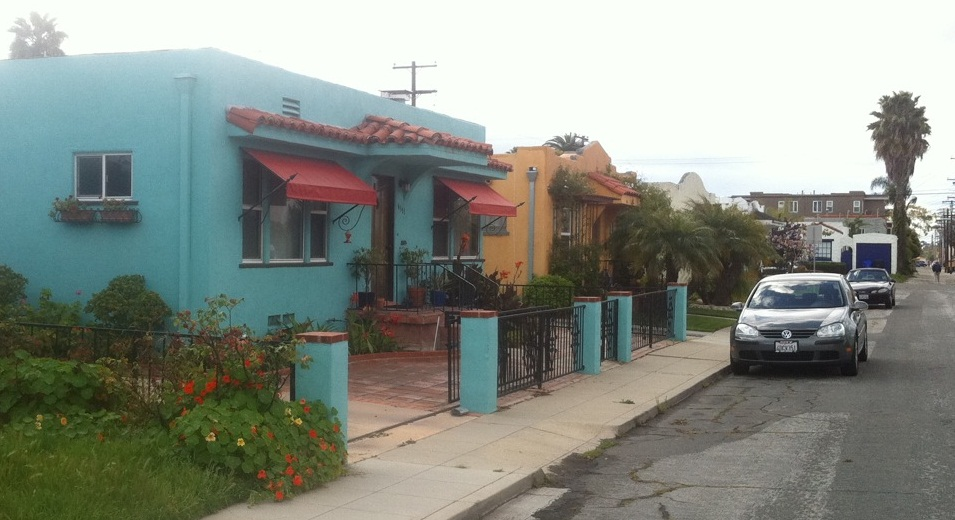

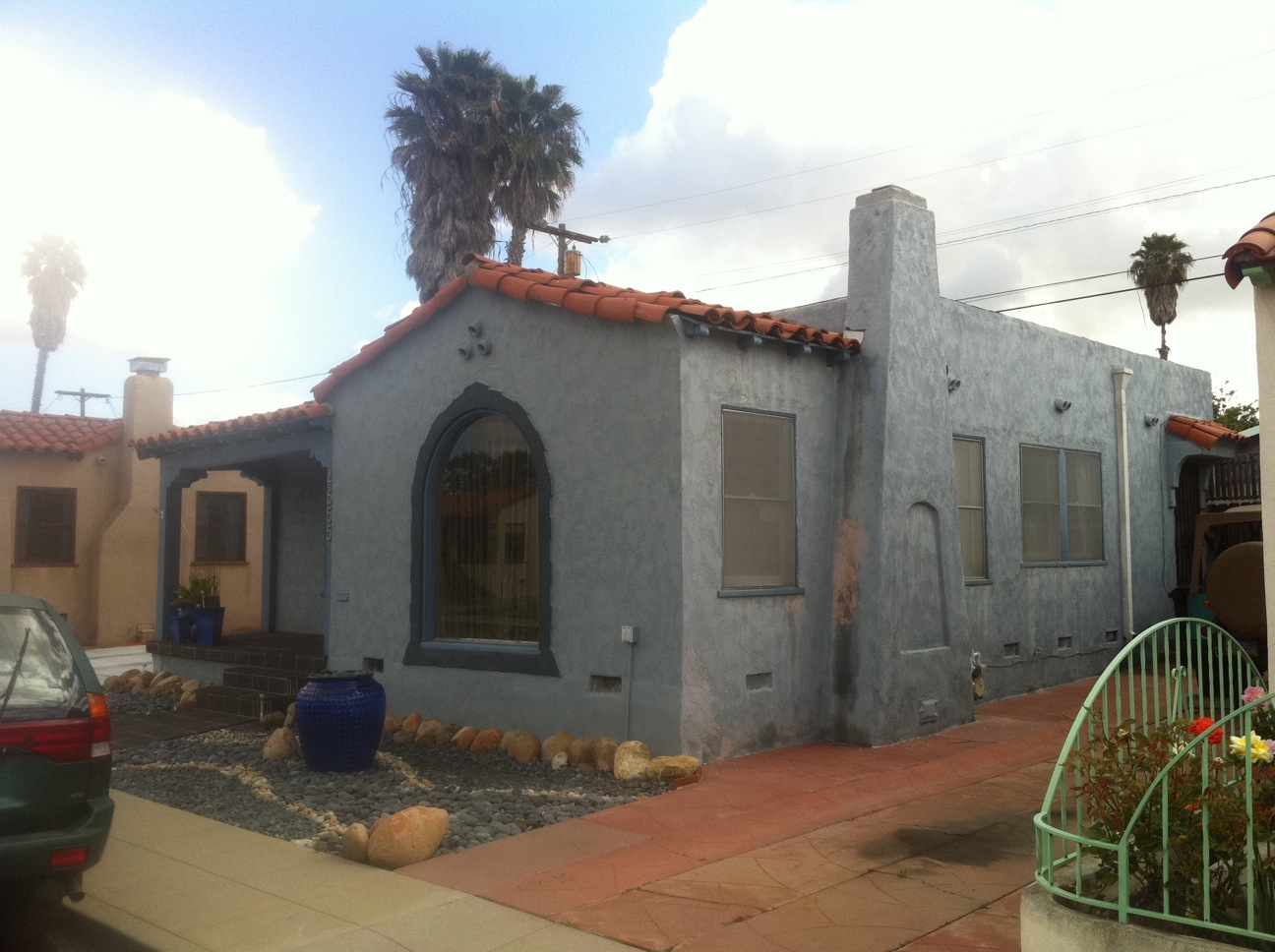

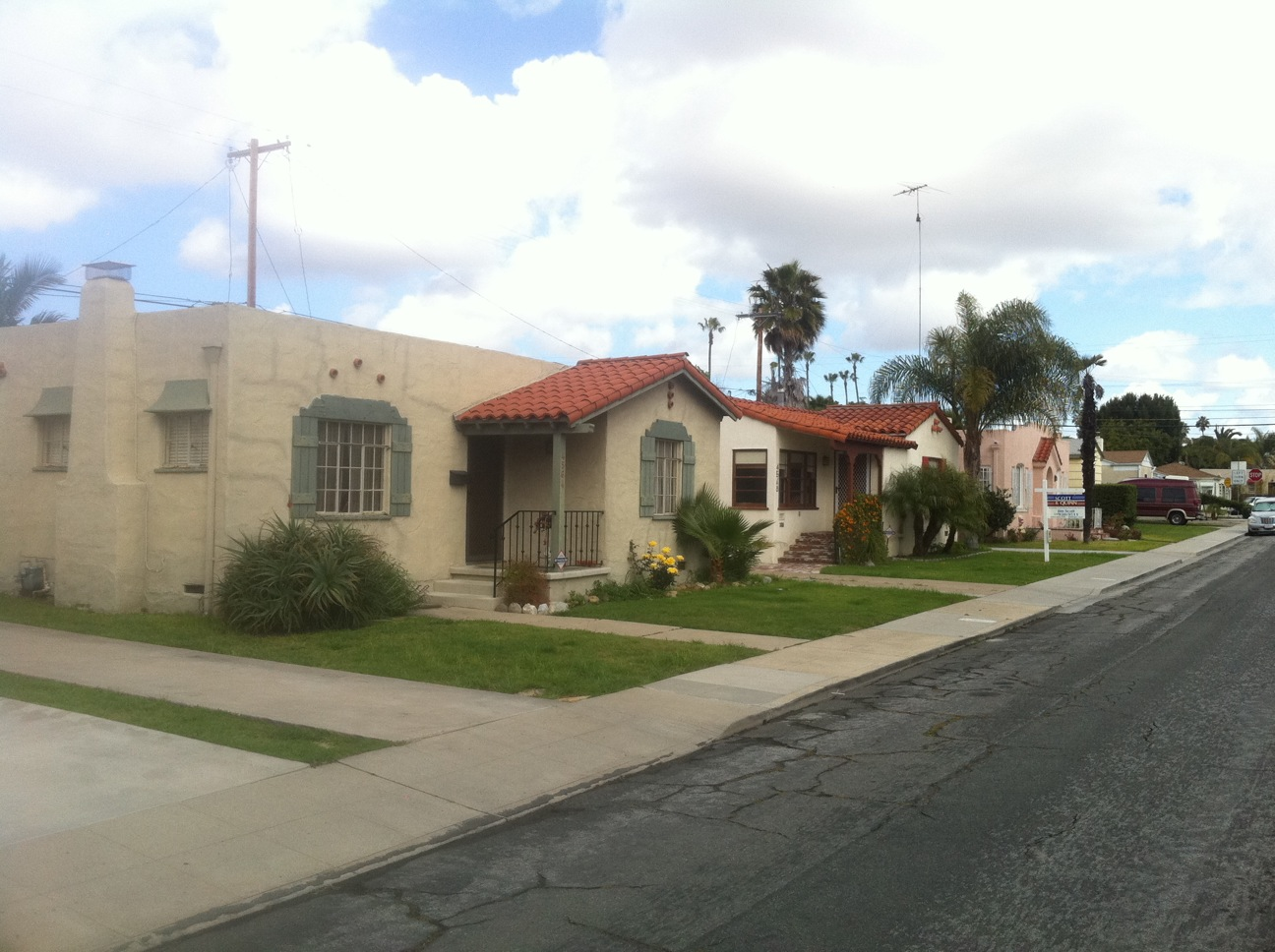

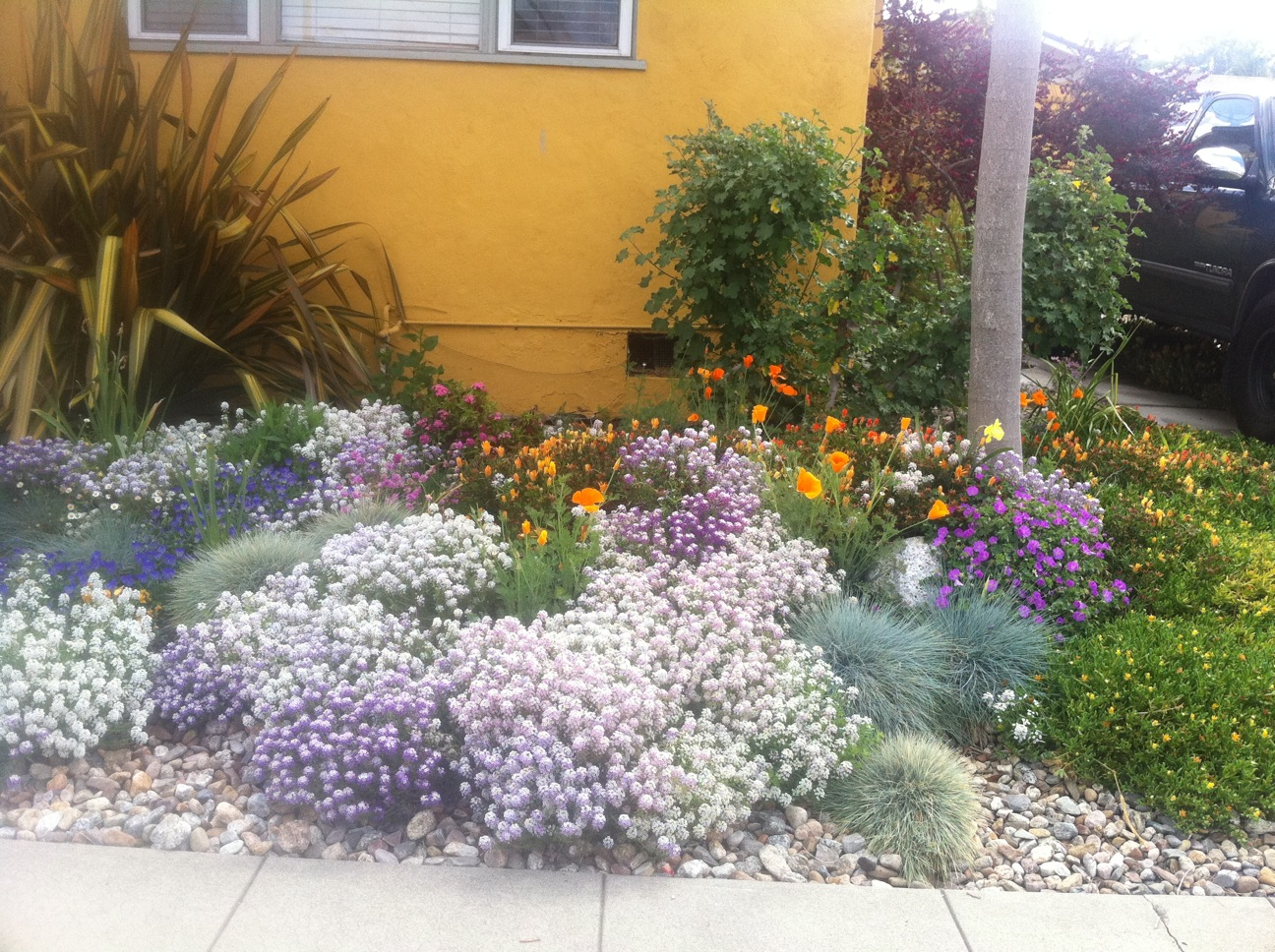

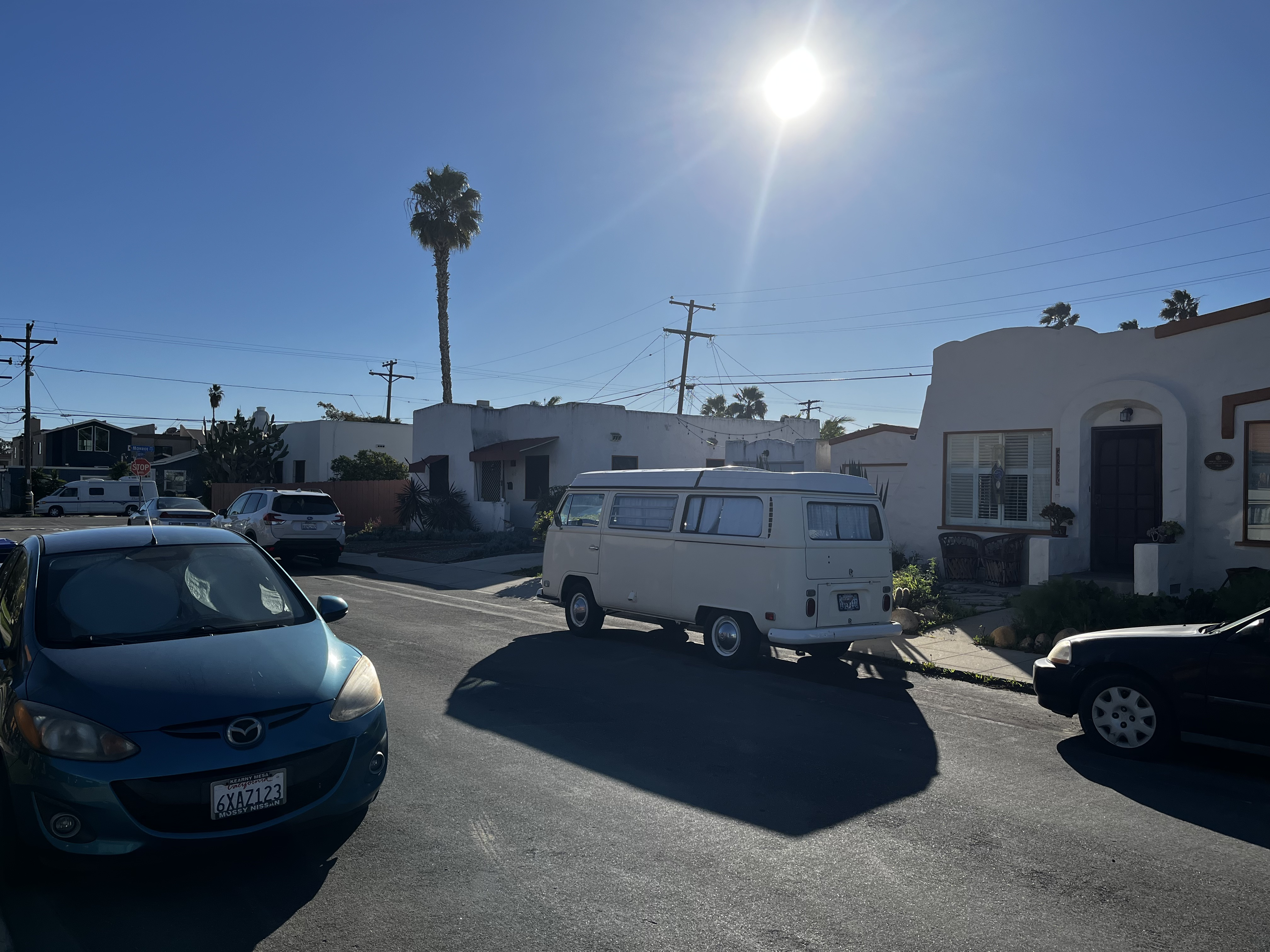

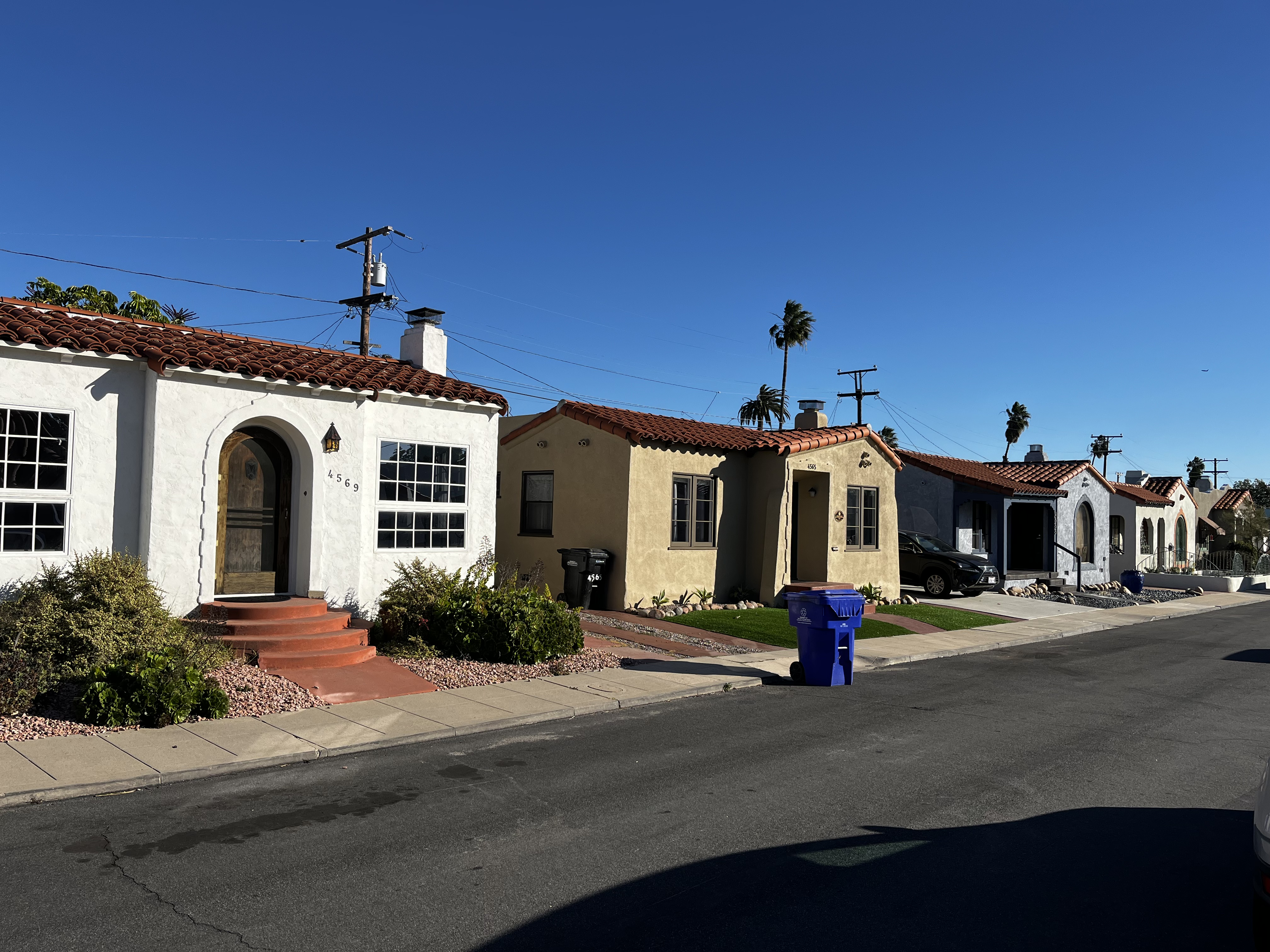
