= University Heights, San Diego =

University Heights
- Community
- University Heights
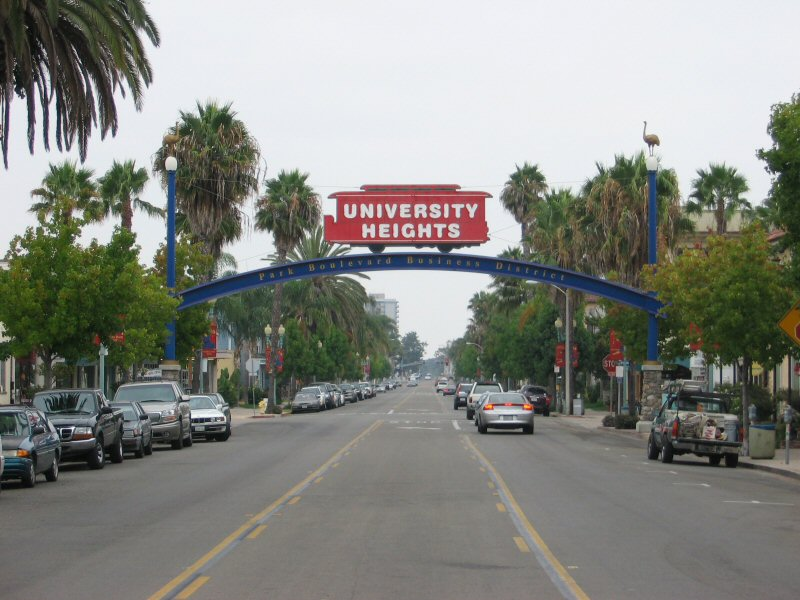
- Park Boulevard Business District Sign at the corner of Park Boulevard and Madison Avenue, designed by Kevin Whaley in 1997.

- University Heights, San Diego University Heights (California) University Heights (the United States)
- Coordinates: 32°45′30″N 117°8′56″W
- Country: United States of America
- State: California
- County: San Diego
- City: San Diego
- Established: 1888
- Zip Code: 92116, 92103
- Area Code: 619

University Heights is a neighborhood in San Diego, California, centered on Park Boulevard and Adams Avenue. University Heights is bounded on the west and north by the edge of the mesa overlooking Mission Valley, the southern boundary is Lincoln Avenue, and the eastern boundary is Texas Street.

The area is filled with a number of restaurants, coffee shops, boutiques, and artist studios primarily on Park Boulevard and Adams Avenue. Live entertainment can be found most nights. Adjacent to Hillcrest, Normal Heights and North Park, additional restaurants, bars, coffee shops, and night clubs are within easy reach.

The neighborhood sits in a central San Diego location with a broad spectrum of housing options, from cottages, apartments and condominiums, to million-dollar homes. Downtown, Balboa Park, San Diego International Airport, Mission Valley, and San Diego State University (SDSU), are close to the area.

== History ==
The area was founded in 1888. The name "University" (both for the neighborhood and nearby University Avenue) derives from a plan, originally proposed during the land boom of the 1880s, to build a branch of the University of Southern California in the area. The plan fell through, and the tract of land intended for the university was later used for the State Normal School (predecessor to San Diego State College). The headquarters of San Diego Unified School District currently occupies the site, near the corner of El Cajon and Park boulevards.

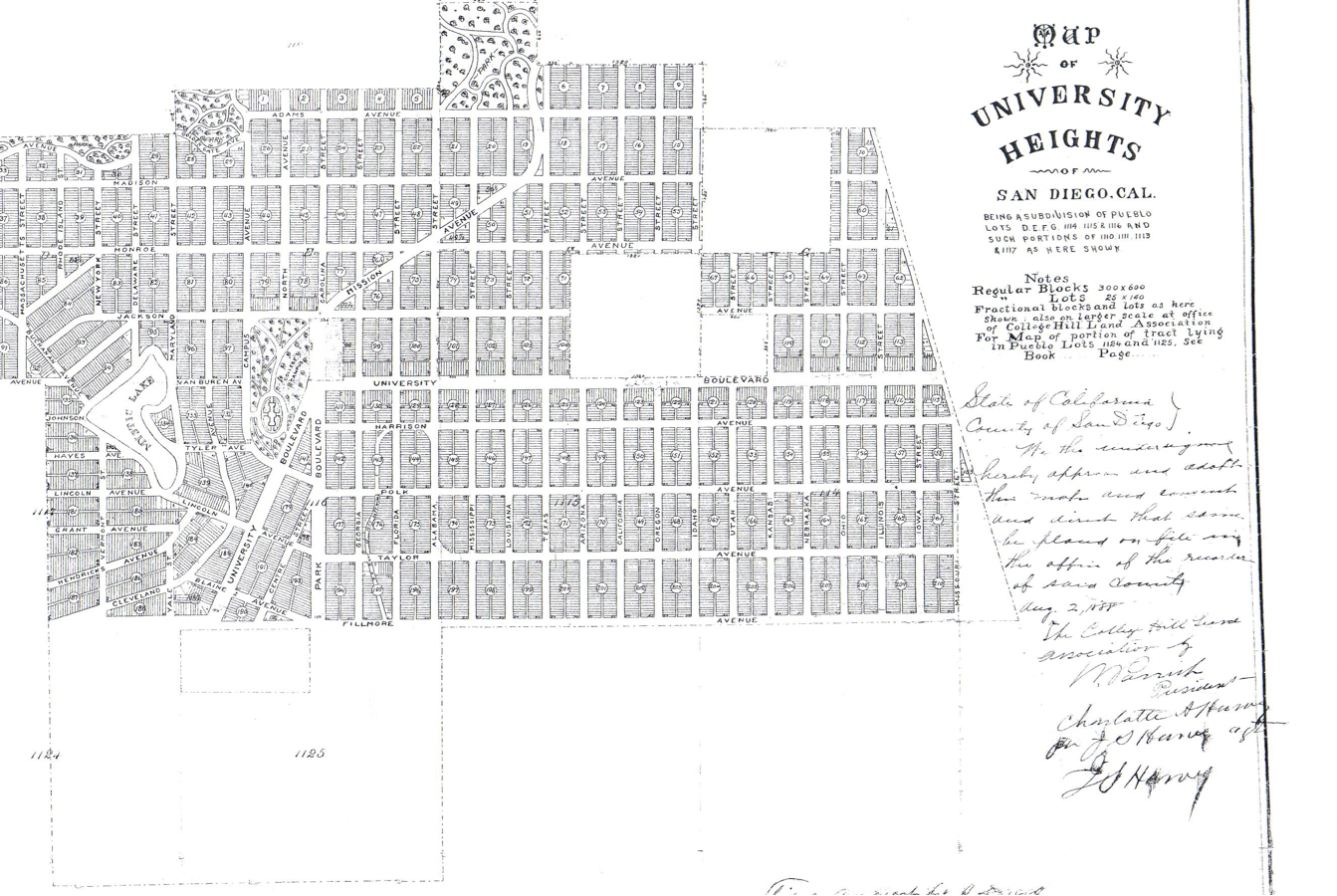
The original subdivision boundaries of the University Heights neighborhood in San Diego from 1888.

The area's population and facilities grew dramatically in 1915 because of the Panama–California Exposition in nearby Balboa Park in 1915-16. On the far northern edge of this mesa, at the scenic rim of Mission Valley, an ostrich farm and public garden spot was constructed near what is now the corner of Adams Avenue and Park Boulevard. Later a neighborhood of homes called Mission Cliff Gardens was built on the site. The gardens were a popular tourist site. The neighborhood still retains the original garden boundary wall of rounded stones.

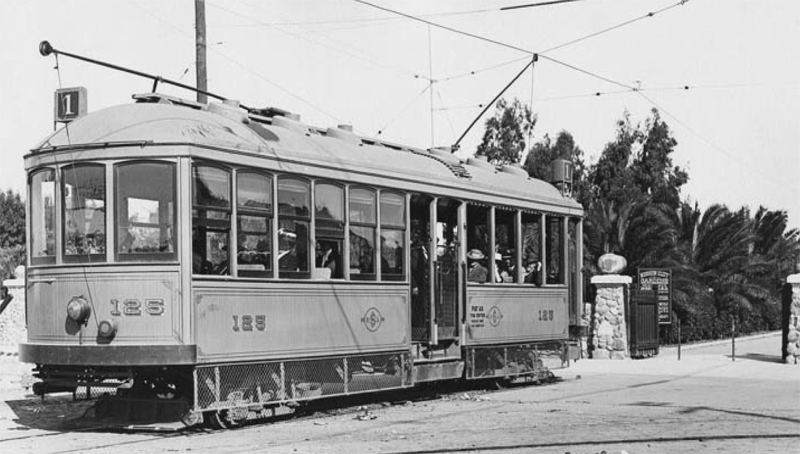
A Class 1 streetcar at Trolley Barn Park, near Mission Cliff Gardens in University Heights

University Heights became one of the many San Diego neighborhoods connected by the Class 1 streetcars and an extensive San Diego public transit system that was spurred by the Panama–California Exposition and built by John D. Spreckels. Built in part to exclusively serve Mission Cliff Gardens, these streetcars became a fixture of this neighborhood until their retirement in 1939. A trolley barn in the area was used for trolley housing and repairs; the facility was converted into a warehouse for the San Diego Paper Box Company and ultimately demolished in 1980. Developers planned to build a large condominium complex at the site, but residents convinced the city to preserve the land for a park, now Old Trolley Barn Park.

== Architecture and historic districts ==
Shirley Ann Place between Madison Ave. and Monroe Ave., has been designated a historic district by the City of San Diego for its 1920s Spanish Colonial Revival bungalows.

The Georgia Street Bridge, a Romanesque spandrel arch with Mission Revival styling which is technically in nearby North Park, was added to the National Register of Historic Places upon application by the "University Heights Historical Society."

== Parks ==
Trolley Barn Park on Adams Avenue, just east of Park Boulevard, is popular with young families and hosts free concerts on Friday evenings during the summer. Sidewalks around the playground in the park are laid out in a pattern mimicking the local street plan, a design also echoed on the carved stone plaque.

== Street sign ==
In 1994 community development funds were allocated to construct a street overhead sign. In 1995 a contest was held calling for entries from local artists for the street sign design. Kevin Whaley's winning concept design was unveiled at the University Heights Community Association meeting. The design incorporated historical elements from the past and present within the community.

In 1996 the City of San Diego awarded the construction project to Young Electric Sign Company (YESCO). On April 3, 1997 the sign was unveiled and illuminated for the first time during a community celebration. The ribbon was cut by then-Mayor Susan Golding and several dignitaries were on hand. The sign serves today as a local landmark and identity for the University Heights community.
