= The Lafayette Hotel and Club =

Building in San Diego, California, US

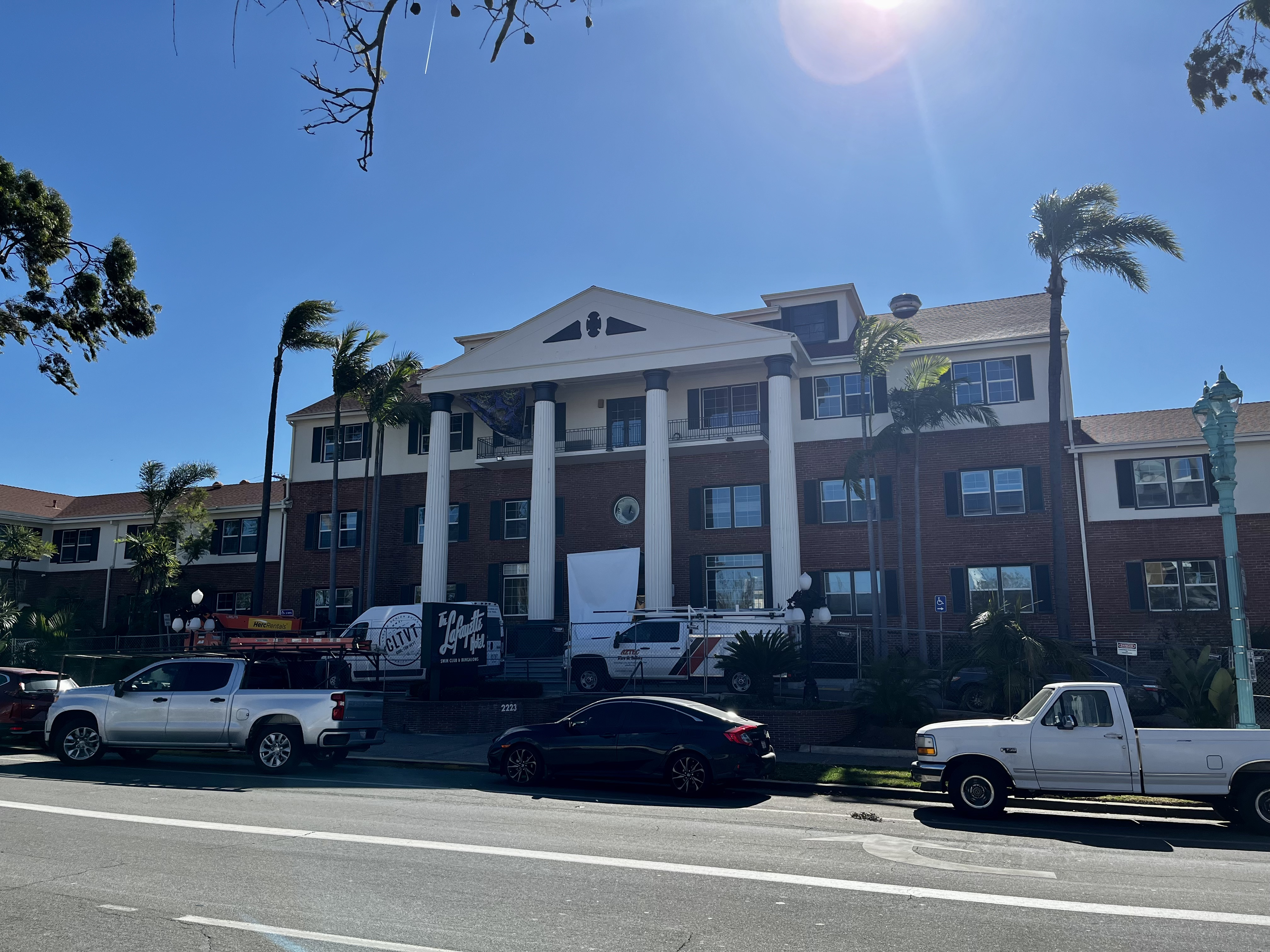

- Location within California

General information
- Location: 2223 El Cajon Blvd, San Diego, California 92104
- Coordinates: 32°45′18″N 117°8′26″W
- Opening: 1 July 1946
- Operator: CH Projects

Technical details
- Floor count: 5

Other information
- Number of rooms: 141
- Number of suites: 32
- Parking: Covered Garage and Exterior Parking Available

Website
- Official Website
- The Lafayette Hotel, Swim Club & Bungalows
- U.S. National Register of Historic Places
- NRHP reference No.: 12000443
- Added to NRHP: July 31, 2012

The Lafayette Hotel and Club is a hotel in San Diego, California, United States, that opened July 1, 1946. It was listed on the National Register of Historic Places on July 31, 2012.

The Lafayette's original name was Imig Manor, owned by local entrepreneur Larry Imig. It was originally built at a cost of $2 million on El Cajon Boulevard. When Imig Manor opened in 1946, its first guest was Bob Hope; other celebrities followed. “The buildings and the pool are steeped in the history of Hollywood’s heyday, the 1940s and ’50s,” according to the developer.

By 1960, Interstate 8 replaced El Cajon Boulevard as the main east-west connector of San Diego, and hotel operations ceased due to the loss of through traffic on El Cajon Boulevard. The building was passed through several owners, until Hampstead Lafayette Partners purchased 2.6 acres (11,000 m^{2}) in North Park, including the Lafayette Hotel, for $11.5 million in March 2004. In 2010 a year-long, $4 million facelift was announced, aided by a $2.4 million loan from the city's Redevelopment Agency. District 3 City Councilmember Todd Gloria called the revitalization a return to the hotel's “glamour and opulence.”

From 2013 to 2018, the hotel was the venue for Finest City Improv, an improvisational theater.

The hotel was closed from fall 2022 to summer 2023 for extensive renovations, including upgrades for the guest rooms and the addition of eight new restaurants and bars. The hotel reopened in July 2023 after a $31 million renovation.

The hotel has a swimming pool designed by Johnny Weissmuller, a ballroom, and 141 guest suites, each named for a great name in film history.

In 2024 the hotel was inducted into Historic Hotels of America, an official program of the National Trust for Historic Preservation.

== In popular culture ==
The Lafayette Hotel served as a film set for the feature film Top Gun.
