= San Diego Class 1 streetcar =

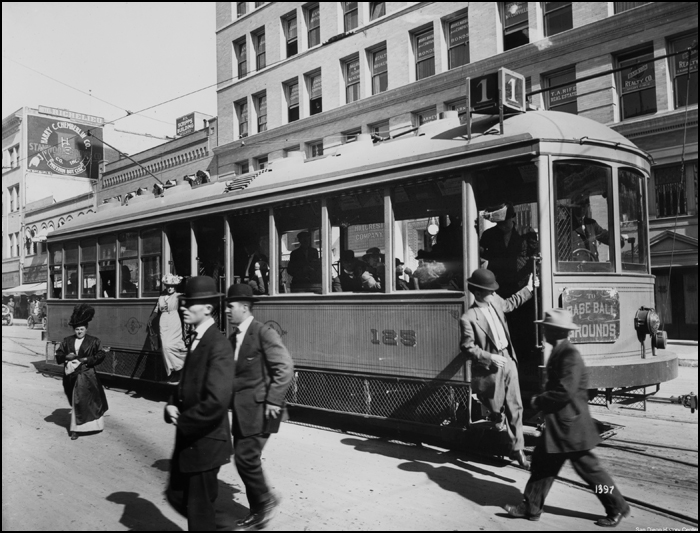
- Photo of Class 1 Streetcar #125 at 5th and Broadway in San Diego, CA (1915).
- In service: 1912-1939
- Manufacturer: St. Louis Car Company
- Constructed: 1910-1912
- Number built: 24
- Capacity: About 100

Specifications
- Car length: 43 feet 7 inches (13.28 m)

The San Diego Class 1 streetcar was a fleet of twenty-four unique streetcars that were originally built to provide transportation for the Panama–California Exposition in Balboa Park. The cars were designed by the San Diego Electric Railway Company (SDERy) under the leadership of John D. Spreckels and built by the St. Louis Car Company. These cars, which took the best elements from preceding models and integrated them into a new, modern streetcar design, went on to serve the many neighborhoods of San Diego until they were retired in 1939.

While most of them were ultimately destroyed over the years, three remaining Class 1 streetcars are preserved and are in storage.

== History ==
=== The Panama-California Exposition and the inception of the Class 1 streetcars ===
To celebrate the opening of the Panama Canal and to advertise San Diego as a vital port destination for traveling ships, city leaders planned the Panama-California Exposition of 1915. It was decided it would take place in Balboa Park, which was largely an open space park up until that point and would have to undergo major renovations and construction to be made ready for the event. Visionary artists and developers from San Diego and throughout America came together to design and construct an impressive new park. Apart from the architectural and botanical transformations that took place in Balboa Park, John D. Spreckels and his San Diego Electric Railway Company (SDERy) took on the task of providing public transportation for the Exposition. Directing a team of engineers and designers led by Abel A. Butterworth, Spreckels, and SDERy Vice President, William Clayton, sought to develop a new streetcar that could both provide transportation for the visitors at the Panama-California Exposition and for the city of San Diego in the following decades of anticipated growth.

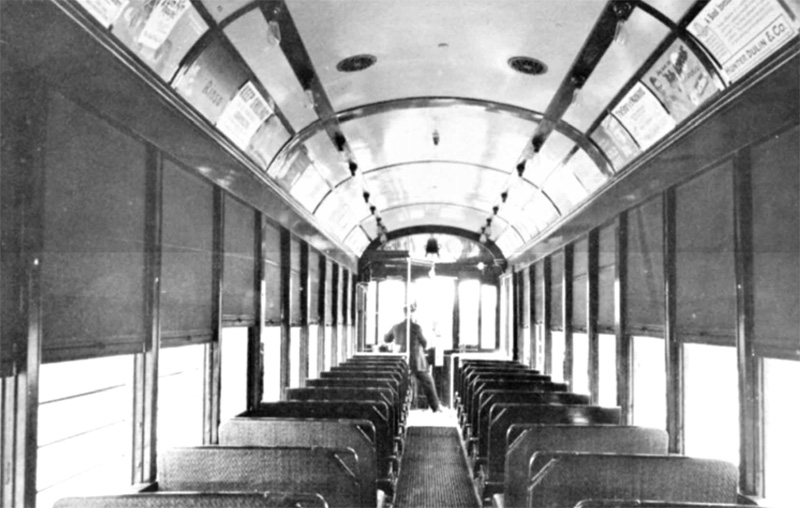
Inside a San Diego Class 1 Streetcar.

One of the main goals for Spreckels and San Diego Electric Railway was improving upon the flaws of existing streetcars, all the while synthesizing their strengths. Taking notes from both the “California Car” and “Closed Car” models, Butterworth and his team successfully developed an updated, modern streetcar with improved safety, speed, technology, and overall design. These new cars, known as the Class 1s, were also designed in the Arts & Crafts style with an artist’s touch to complement the changes to Balboa Park. Built by the world-renowned Saint Louis Car Company, they were adorned with warm yellow colors, gold-leafed oak leaves, hand-polished cherry wood, and solid bronze hardware –- even the push buttons passengers used to alert the motorman were inlaid with mother-of-pearl. The first of these cars went into service in 1912.

The fleet of twenty-four Class 1 streetcars went on to serve the patrons of the Panama–California Exposition and the citizens of San Diego for several years.

=== The streetcars in operation in San Diego ===
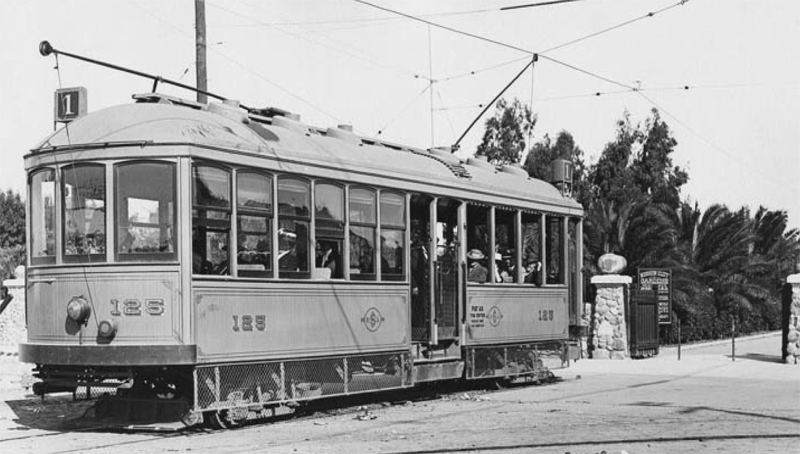
Archival photo of Class 1 streetcar #125 at the Park Ave. entrance to Mission Cliff Gardens in the University Heights neighborhood of San Diego, CA

Following the success of the Panama-California Exposition, the Class 1 streetcars became a mainstay of early 20th-century public transportation in San Diego. The improved design was met with enthusiasm from the general public and these streetcars became a popular mode of transit, often carrying over twice their intended capacity in passengers.

One of the most significant features of the Class 1s was the development of the “center entrance”, a large opening door in the center of the streetcar that also lowered spring-loaded steps for ease of entrance. This improved safety a great deal and made it easier for women in their fashionable “hobble skirts” to enter a streetcar with a greatly reduced risk of falling over. This new center entrance was also combined, for the first time in the Class 1 streetcars, with the “P.A.Y.E”, or “Pay As You Enter”, system. Soon after San Diego’s streetcars were developed, New York City followed suit and commissioned its own center entrance, the “P.A.Y.E.” streetcar line.

The various advancements made with the Class 1s ensured their widespread expansion across San Diego, with lines ultimately running everywhere from Downtown, to Coronado, Ocean Beach, Mission Hills, Old Town, Hillcrest, University Heights, North Park, South Park, Golden Hill, Kensington, Chula Vista, and even to the U.S.-Mexico border (until 1916).

=== The Great Depression leads to the retirement of the Class 1 streetcars ===
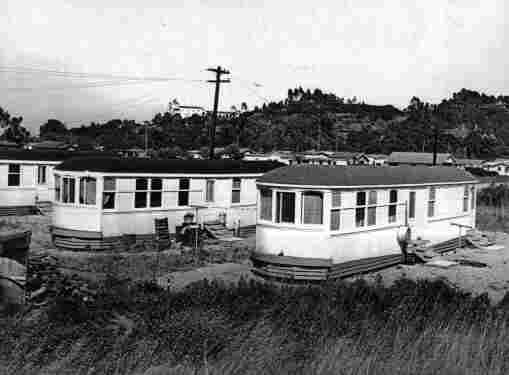
Archival photo of Class 1 streetcar homes in the Old Town neighborhood of San Diego, CA.

Ultimately, after some updates and improvements in the mid-1920s, the San Diego Class 1 streetcars met the same fate as most light rail as The Great Depression began to take hold in America. As the government moved to economize public transportation systems to reduce the financial burden of public transit budgets, many cities decided to make the switch to the cheaper, utilitarian Presidents' Conference Committee (PCC) streetcars. Developed by a collaborative committee of streetcar company presidents, this mass-produced vehicle was designed to look like a then-modern city bus and represented a necessary shift during the tough economic times.

As a result, the Class 1 streetcars were retired and some were auctioned off in 1939. Some were even turned into homes before a city law that prevented the practice was passed later that same year. Following the ban on streetcar sales, the remaining Class 1 bodies were destroyed. However, the sale of a few of these streetcars has allowed for three of these important pieces of San Diego's history to be preserved until this day.

== Potential for restoration ==
=== The preservation and future of the Class 1 streetcars ===
While most of them were ultimately destroyed over the years, three remaining Class 1 streetcars were saved from this fate in 1996 by a San Diego antique dealer and collector Christian T. Chaffee. They have since been designated San Diego Historic Landmarks (#339) and have been preserved to this day in storage in San Diego.

Fred Bennett, who was involved with the San Francisco Vintage Trolley project, found that the Class 1s were ideal candidates for restoration and recommended that they return to the streets on a streetcar line.

In 2021, these three surviving Class 1 cars, numbered 126, 128, and 136, were donated to the San Diego Electric Railway Association (SDERA). The cars are currently awaiting restoration at the National City station.

== See also ==
- San Diego Trolley
- Streetcars in North America
