= San Diego Electric Railway =

Mass transit system (1892–1949)

- San Diego Electric Railways network

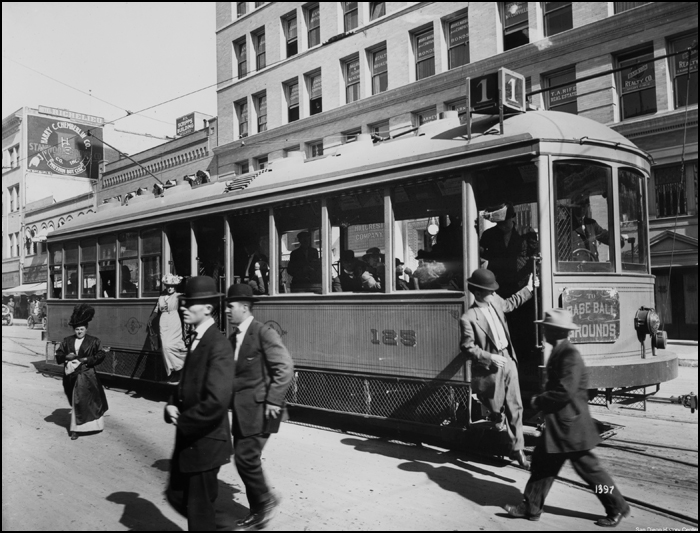
- A San Diego Class 1 streetcar at 5th and Broadway, c. 1915

Overview
- Headquarters: San Diego, California
- Reporting mark: SDER
- Locale: California
- Dates of operation: 1892–1949

Technical
- Track gauge: 4 ft 8 1/2 in (1,435 mm) standard gauge
- Previous gauge: 3 ft 6 in (1,067 mm) (until about 1898)
- Electrification: Overhead line, 600 V DC

The San Diego Electric Railway (SDERy) was a mass transit system in San Diego County, California, United States. The system utilized 600 volt direct current streetcars and (in later years) buses.

The SDERy was established by sugar heir and land developer John D. Spreckels in 1892. The railroad's original network consisted of five routes: the Fifth Street and Logan Heights Lines, the First and "D" Streets Lines, the Depot Line, the Ferry Line, and the "K" Street Shuttle. The company would establish additional operating divisions as traffic demands led to the formation of new lines. The company also engaged in limited freight handling primarily as an interchange with Spreckels' San Diego and Arizona Railway (SD&A) from 1923 to 1929.

At its peak, the SDERy's routes would operate throughout the greater San Diego area over some 165 miles (266 km) of track. Declining ridership, due in large part to the growing usage of the automobile, ultimately led the company to discontinue all streetcar service in favor of bus routes in 1949. Some see this as related to National City Lines' General Motors streetcar conspiracy controversy, as the SDERy's president had been with NCL previously.

The few surviving pieces of rolling stock are on display at the Pacific Southwest Railway Museum in Campo, the San Diego Electric Railway Association in National City, and the Orange Empire Railway Museum in Perris, California.

== History ==
=== Predecessors ===
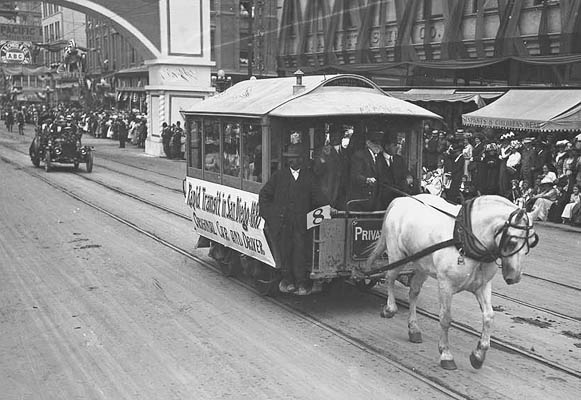
"Rapid Transit in San Diego": An original 1886 horse-drawn trolley and its driver participate in a parade celebrating the groundbreaking of the Panama–California Exposition Center in 1911.

On July 3, 1886, the first horse-drawn open-air streetcar of the San Diego Street Car Company (SDSCC) (founded by H. L. Story and E. S. Babcock) made its run up 5th Street. The fare was five cents ($1.79 in 2025 adjusted for inflation).

The following year on November 9, the first electric-powered streetcar made a test run on new tracks up Broadway to Kettner Boulevard and on to "Old Town". Regular electric streetcar service was inaugurated on November 19 on the San Diego and Old Town Street Railway, making it the first electric railway on the West Coast and the second in the country to use the "ground return" for electric current. On December 31, 1887, the Electric Rapid Transit Company (ERTC) put an electric streetcar into regular operation on Fourth Street as far as the Florence Hotel on Fir Street. When ERTC failed, the San Diego Cable Railway (SDCR) was incorporated in July 1889 to replace it. The opening day of the SDCR was June 7, 1890, and it soon opened "Mission Cliffs Gardens", a small recreation park (one of San Diego's first public recreation areas) overlooking Mission Valley, as an end-of-the-line attraction for cable car patrons.

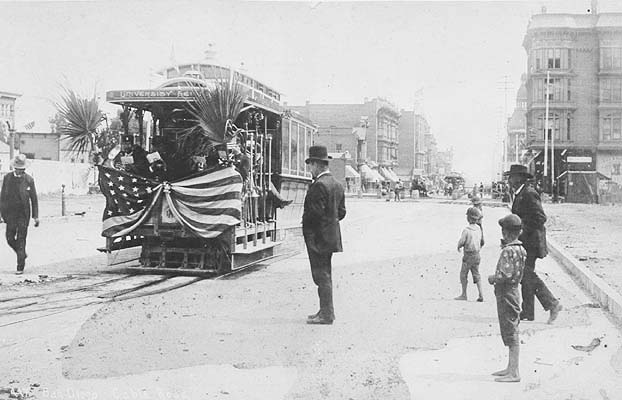
Opening Day on the San Diego Cable Railway; June 7, 1890

=== San Diego Electric Railway Company ===
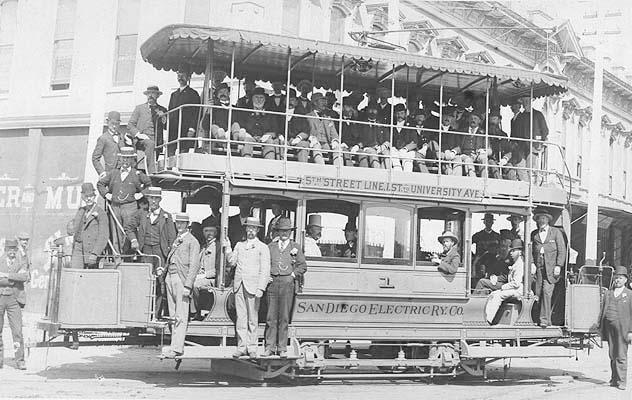
SDERy double-decker Car No. 1 pauses at the intersection of 5th Street & Market Street during its inaugural run on September 21, 1892.

By November 30, 1891 John D. Spreckels incorporated the San Diego Electric Railway Company (SDERy). On January 30, the SDERy purchased the SDSCC and the majority of its assets for $115,000 ($4.12 million in 2025 adjusted for inflation); over the next few years the company would also acquire the competing Park Belt Line and the Ocean Beach Railroad. Plans were made to convert all existing lines to traction, and ten single-truck, single-trolley, open platform wooden cars were subsequently purchased from the J. G. Brill Company. Double-decker Car No. 1, the first such electrically operated car in the United States, made the inaugural run on September 21, 1892, with many of the city's notables aboard. A few weeks later, the SDCR completed its last run, the company having declared bankruptcy earlier in the year. At the end of 1892, the line had grown to 16.70 miles (26.88 km) of aggregated system track (12.21 miles or 19.65 kilometres of single electrified track with 4.49 miles or 7.23 kilometres for horse-drawn cars). Many new electrified lines were constructed during the coming years.

In August 1895, the Citizens Traction Company (CTC) was formed and purchased the remains of the SDCR for $17,600, adapting the line to electric operation in order to compete with the SDERy. On July 28, 1896, the first converted trolley car ran the entire length of the 4.49-mile (7.23 km) long CTC line. However, by February 1897 financial difficulties forced the CTC to go into receivership. Elisa Babcock, as agent for the SDERy, bought the properties and franchises of the CTC in March 1898 for $19,000 plus "fees and costs." The track gauge was subsequently widened from 3 ft 6 in (1,067 mm) narrow gauge to 4 ft 8 1/2 in (1,435 mm) standard gauge.

In 1905 Spreckels had a new power generating plant built to accommodate the additional loads imposed by the expanding streetcar network. He announced the following year the formation of San Diego and Arizona Railway (SD&A) and plans for a 148-mile (238 km) line between San Diego and El Centro. The Third Avenue Streetcar Line began operation. The SDERy logged 798,152 car miles (1,284,501 km). By 1907 the Third Avenue Streetcar Line was extended to the future community of Mission Hills, and was briefly renamed the Mission Hills Line. Spreckels forced a ballot initiative in 1910 to amend his charter with the City of San Diego to give him more than 25 years on his leases to operate streetcar service. With this greater security he was able to acquire major loans for service expansion and infrastructure. The next year, the Imperial Avenue operating division was established downtown. Spreckels had a second power generating plant built at Kettner Boulevard and "E" Street, as the 1905 plant could no longer provide sufficient capacity.

Ordered by Spreckels, with guidance by William Clayton and design by Homer MacNutt and Abel A. Butterworth, 24 Arts and Crafts-style streetcars (to be known as the 'Class 1' streetcar) were delivered to San Diego in 1912. The following year, construction of a new brick car barn located at Adams Avenue and Florida Street was completed. By the end of 1914 the SDERy owned 38.9 miles (62.6 km) of single track and 22.4 miles (36.0 km) of double track, for a total of 83.7 miles (134.7 km) of "equivalent single track".

The 1915 Panama–California Exposition in Balboa Park spurred the next phase of transportation growth. A new electric car line was constructed up 12th Street to the park's entrance with 101 new cars from the St. Louis Car Company, and the Adams Avenue operating division was established in Normal Heights. San Diego's original Victorian style train depot was demolished and replaced with a new Mission Revival Style Santa Fe depot building. The SDERy logged 3,521,571 car miles (5,667,419 km). The "Great Flood" in 1916 caused significant damage, washing out several rail lines. World War I increased the cost of railway construction materials by 50 to 150 percent. There was a significant increase in the private ownership of automobiles, and the SDERy began to lose revenue to private "Jitney Buses". On November 15, 1919, the "golden spike" was driven and construction of the SD&A was ceremonially completed at a cost of $18 million (three times the original estimate). Spreckels announced plans in 1920 to discontinue service on several rail lines to offset expenses, leading to approval of "zone fares". The SDERy purchased new streetcars that required only one driver/conductor instead of two; older cars were retrofitted to reduce labor costs. Spreckels sold his power generating plants to the Consolidated Gas and Electric Company.

=== The first motor buses ===
In 1921 the first motor bus went into service operating between National City and Chula Vista. "Number One" had hard rubber tires, two-wheel mechanical brakes, a four-cylinder engine, and a plywood body. On March 17, 1923, the SDERy began its last major rail line expansion to Mission Beach ("Belmont Park"), Pacific Beach, and La Jolla. $2.5 million were spent on rails, Mission Revival Style terminals and substations, and Egyptian Revival Style stations, and $800,000 were spent on the acquisition of 50 new cars. Construction was completed in 1925. Car No. 400, an all-steel model with a closed body and the first on the SDERy to feature a pantograph-type current collector, was delivered in December 1923. All 50 pantograph-equipped cars would eventually have trolley poles installed at each end due to the pantographs' poor performance.

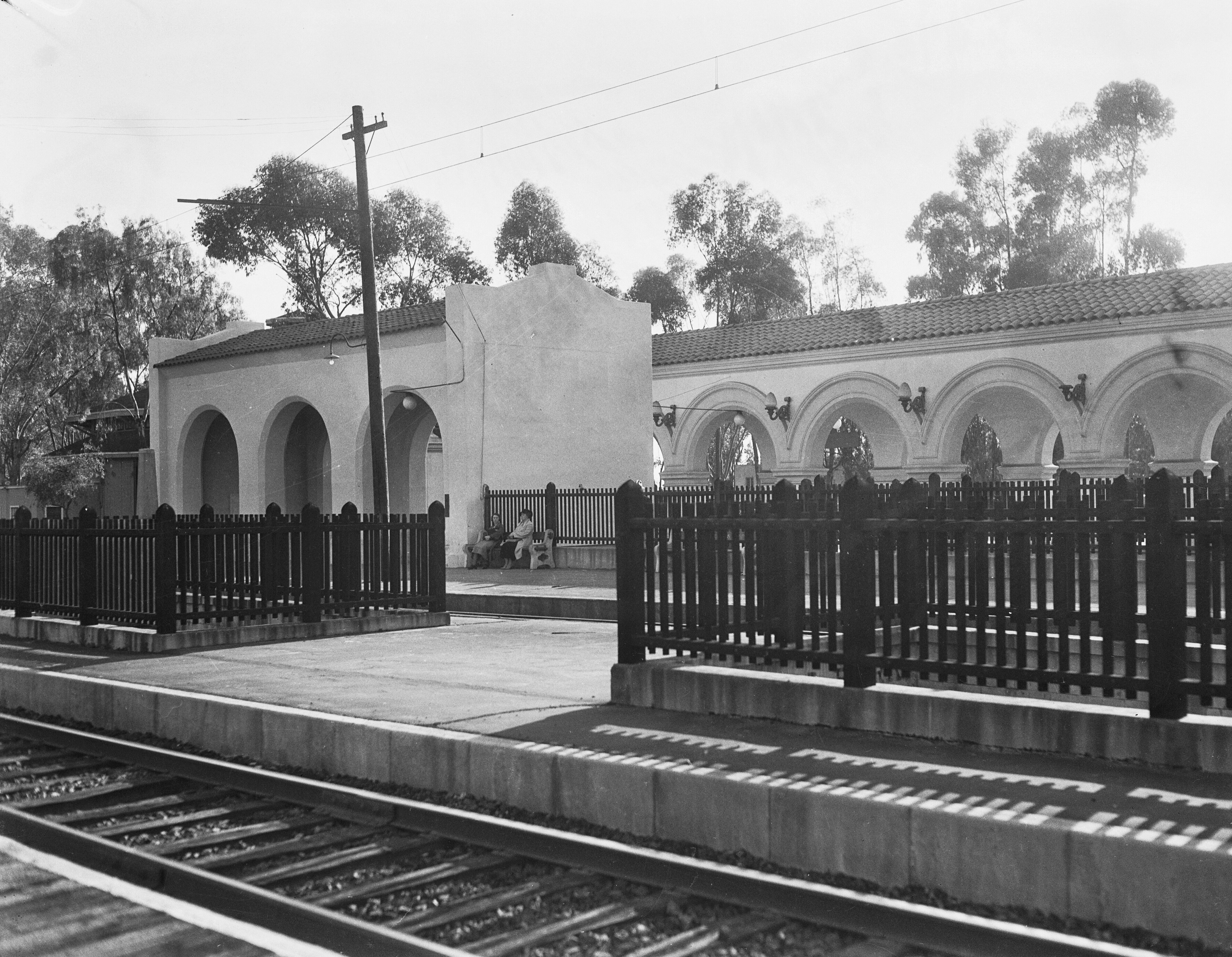
The streetcar stop for the California Pacific International Exposition at Balboa Park, c. 1935.

By 1930 buses began to replace street cars from Ocean Beach to La Jolla, and 222 new buses were added to the fleet. Ridership and revenue decreased but SDERy was able to weather the economic downturn. The 1935 California Pacific International Exposition opened in Balboa Park without the need for expanded transit service. In 1936 SDERy ordered 25 single-end Presidents Conference Committee (PCC) cars from the St. Louis Car Company, and was among the first streetcar systems in the United States to use streamlined units. The cars were designated as Class 6. An order for three additional units was placed the following year.

World War II turned San Diego into a "boom town" again. The population of the city increased due to an influx of military personnel and defense-related industries, and ridership on public transit rose 600 percent during the war years. Used transit vehicles were purchased from around the nation, and more electrical substations were built (one in the basement of the Spreckels Theatre Building on Broadway). The $2.5-million rail line built in the 1920s to the beaches was ripped out, along with the elaborate stations and terminals, and replaced with a bus line. By 1942 the combined streetcar and bus lines carried 94 million people. Additional streetcars were brought in on loan from New York City, Salt Lake City, and Wilkes-Barre, Pennsylvania to help keep up with demand. Combined ridership in 1944 led to more than 146 million trips. In 1946 SDERy began to phase out streetcar lines and replace them with bus routes. By the following year, only three street car lines would remain in operation.

=== New owners and systematic conversion to buses ===
On July 26, 1948, the Western Transit Company (WTC), owned by Jesse Haugh, bought SDERy for $5.5 million. Haugh was also president of Key System and an executive of Pacific Electric Railway. The following month 13 new 45-passenger buses were placed into service. In September 1948 the WTC announced that the SDERy would henceforth be known as the San Diego Transit System (SDTS). A new emblem (consisting of a pair of wings with a shield in the center) and slogan, "Safety, Courtesy, Service," were adopted. In January 1949 the SDTS borrowed $720,000 for the purchase of additional new buses, and made an application to the State Public Utilities Commission (PUC) to discontinue streetcar service, which the PUC granted in March. Sponsored by the Pacific Railroad Society of Los Angeles, a "farewell to the streetcars" excursion was held, operated over the remaining trackage.

The following month 45 new GM buses (each costing $20,000) paraded down Broadway to mark the retirement of the street cars; free rides were offered during the procession. Rail service on the SDERy came to an end on April 24 as Car No. 446 pulled into the Adams Avenue car barn, making San Diego the first major southwestern city to eliminate streetcars and convert to an all-bus transit system. In May 1949 work crews began removing the overhead trolley lines and tracks on the loop at Santa Fe Depot. In 1950, 17 of the PCC model cars were sold to the El Paso City Lines (EPCL) for service on the international loop between El Paso, Texas, and the Mexican border city of Ciudad Juárez, Chihuahua. A few years later, three more PCCs were sold to EPCL. All remaining Class 5 cars and the three "service" cars were purchased by the Allied Salvage Company for scrap. The eight remaining PCCs were purchased in August 1957 by the San Diego Mill Supply Company. Car No. 167 and Car No. 508 are preserved at the Southern California Railway Museum in Perris, California, and Car No. 528 was obtained by the San Diego Railway Historical Society for preservation and exhibition.

=== Revival: San Diego Trolley system ===
After years of planning and development, the "San Diego Trolley" (a new interurban light rail mass transit system) made its inaugural run on July 19, 1981, on the 15.9-mile (25.6 km) long "South Line" between downtown and the Mexican border. The following week San Diego Trolley began revenue service; San Diego would become known in transit circles as "The city that started the 'light rail craze' in the United States".

In August 1996, three "Class 1" streetcars were saved for San Diego. These cars, numbered 126, 128, and 138, had been ordered by John Spreckels in anticipation of the 1915 Panama–California Exposition. The logo of the SDERy is still visible. The San Diego Historic Site Board recognized the three native "Class 1" streetcars with the official designation of San Diego Landmark #339. In February 2005, the San Diego Electric Railway Association salvaged the body shell of Car No. 357 (formerly of the Bellingham, Washington streetcar system) from a Downtown restaurant site where it had been used as a dining room since 1972.

In December 2005, the San Diego Vintage Trolley Co. purchased three former San Francisco Municipal Railway PCC cars (one numbered 529). Car No. 529 was later fully restored for public rail service. Three other PCC cars, two from SEPTA and one from New Jersey (531-533), were subsequently purchased. In March 2014, MTS took possession of a second 1946 PCC streetcar, destined to join public service as Car #530. It was estimated that the mostly cosmetic restoration work required to restore Car #530 to service would take six to eight months. The PCC cars were planned to run on a loop route around downtown using existing San Diego Trolley tracks. San Diego Metropolitan Transit System, in a partnership with the San Diego historic streetcar society, began select weekday, weekend and holiday mid-day service in August 2011 on this new heritage streetcar Silver Line, which operates around downtown San Diego using the renovated PCC streetcar #529. By March 2011 MTS began work on a study to evaluate the feasibility of reconnecting Balboa Park, the San Diego Zoo, and downtown San Diego through a fixed-guideway, electrified streetcar line that might operate as an extension of the Silver Line and might be operated with other restored heritage streetcars.

== Routes ==
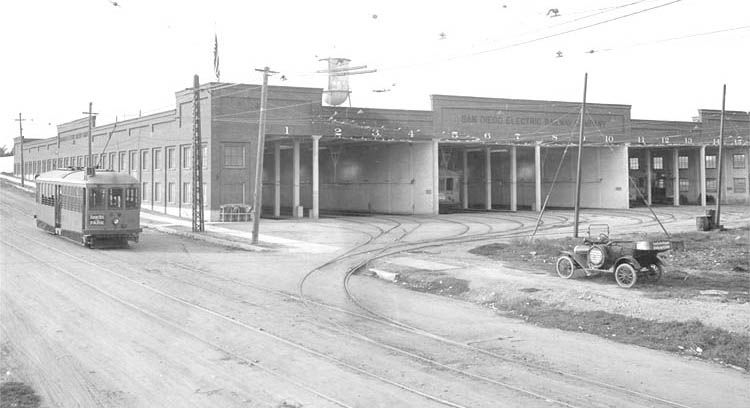
A view of the SDERy streetcar barn located at "Mission Cliffs Gardens" on Adams Avenue, c. 1915

Routes in 1925 – roughly the system's largest extent – were as follows:

- 1 – 5th Avenue to Hillcrest, then via University – Park Boulevard - Adams Avenue to 30th Street (just west of Normal Heights)
- 2 – east on Broadway South Park – via 30th Street to North Park
- 3 – via Washington Street and Fort Stockton Avenue to Mission Hills
- 4 – Imperial Avenue to 33rd and Commercial, Stockton
- 5 – north from downtown on First Avenue; east form downtown on Market, south on 25th Street, east on Ocean View Bouleavrd to 39th Street in Mountain View
- 7 – via Park Boulevard through Balboa Park to Hillcrest, then east along University Avenue through North Park to City Heights, then known as East San Diego
- 9 – serving marina at end of Market Street
- 11 – via 5th Avenue to Hillcrest, then via University, and 30th to Adams Avenue; along the length of Adams to Normal Heights and Kensington
- 12 – Logan Heights, National City to Chula Vista
- 13 – Kettner/Hancock to Rosecrans to La Playa, Point Loma
- 14 – Ocean Beach
- 15 – reserved for holiday use to Mission Beach Amusement Park
- 16 – Ocean Beach – Mission Beach – La Jolla

== See also ==
- Los Angeles Railway
- Pacific Electric Railway Company
- Transportation in San Diego County
- List of streetcar systems in the United States (all-time list)
- San Diego and Arizona Eastern Railway
- San Diego and Arizona Railway
- San Diego Trolley
- North County Transit District
