= Finest City Improv =

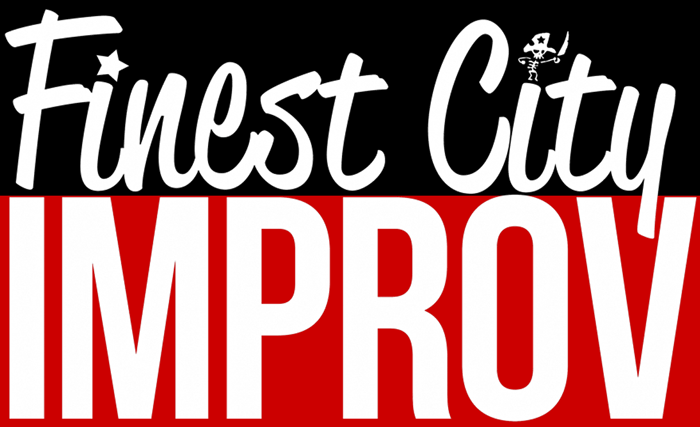
- Finest City Improv's main logo
- Number of locations: 1 Location, 1 Corporate Office
- Area served: San Diego and Southern California
- Key people: Amy Lisewski, Kat Brown, Jesse Suphan
- Services: Improv Comedy
- Owner: Amy Lisewski
- Number of employees: 4

Finest City Improv is an American improvisational theatre in San Diego, California. It hosts weekly shows, offers classes for adults, and brings improv comedy into businesses to teach team building.

== History ==
Finest City Improv was founded in September 2012 by Amy Lisewski. That year, the company joined the Ocean Beach Playhouse to offer Improv Classes. In December 2013, it moved to the Lafayette Hotel in the North Park neighborhood.

In 2019, Lisewski moved the company to a building in the Hillcrest neighborhood, citing prohibitive rent costs at the Lafayette Hotel.

== San Diego Improv Festival ==
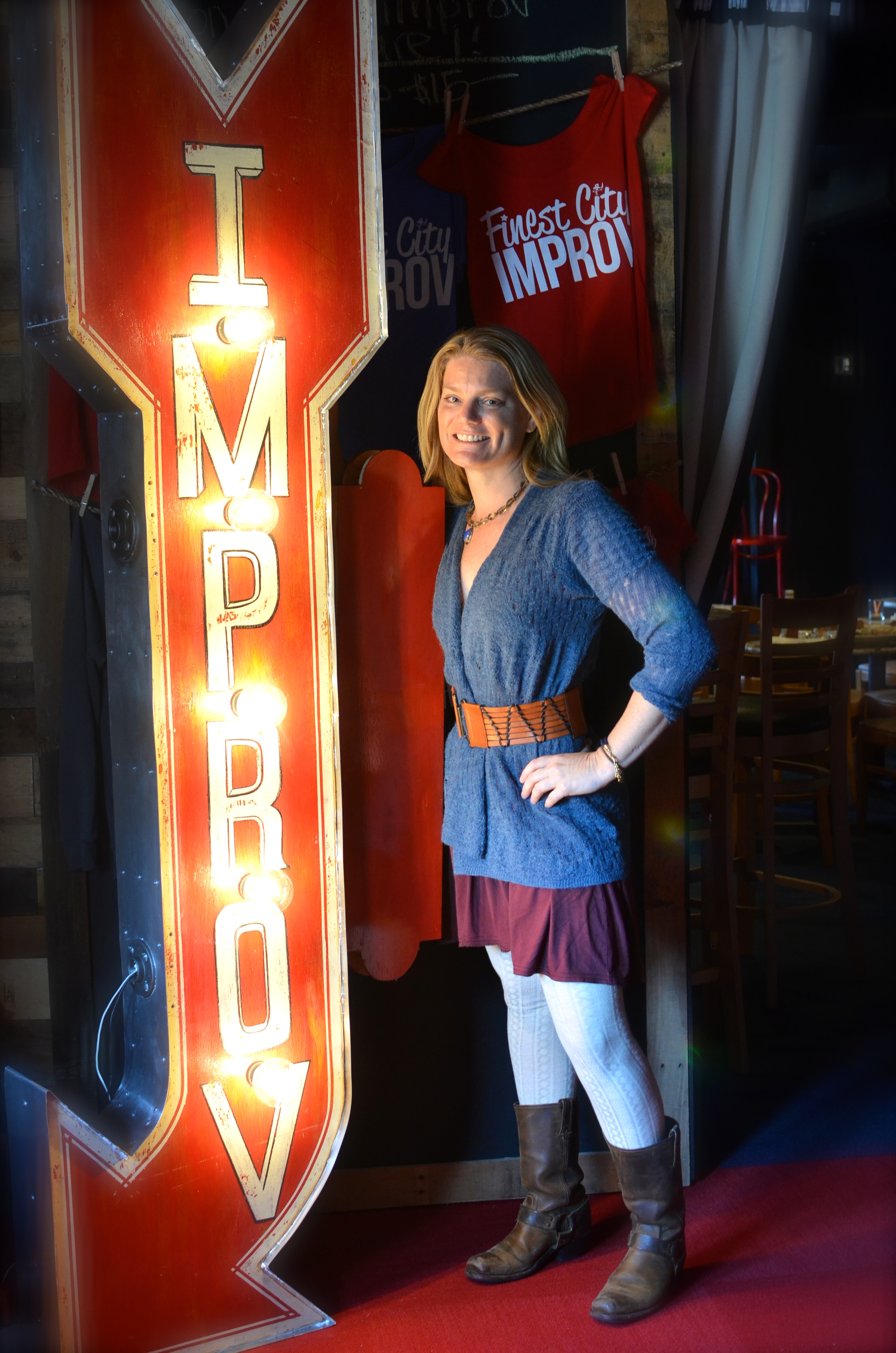
Amy Lisewski

Finest City Improv is the main sponsor and host of the San Diego Improv Festival. Starting in 2014, this annual event invites improvisers from around the world to showcase their talent in San Diego. Such guests include: The Boys, Opening Night, Red Door, and Robot Teammate and the Accidental Party.

== Relax, We're All Just Making This Stuff Up! ==
In 2016, Lisewski wrote and published a book entitled "Relax, We're All Just Making This Stuff Up!" that applies the principles of improvisation as they can apply to individuals in the realm of self development and confidence building.
