= Mission Hills, San Diego =

Community in San Diego, California

Coordinates: 32°45′10.18″N 117°11′10.90″W

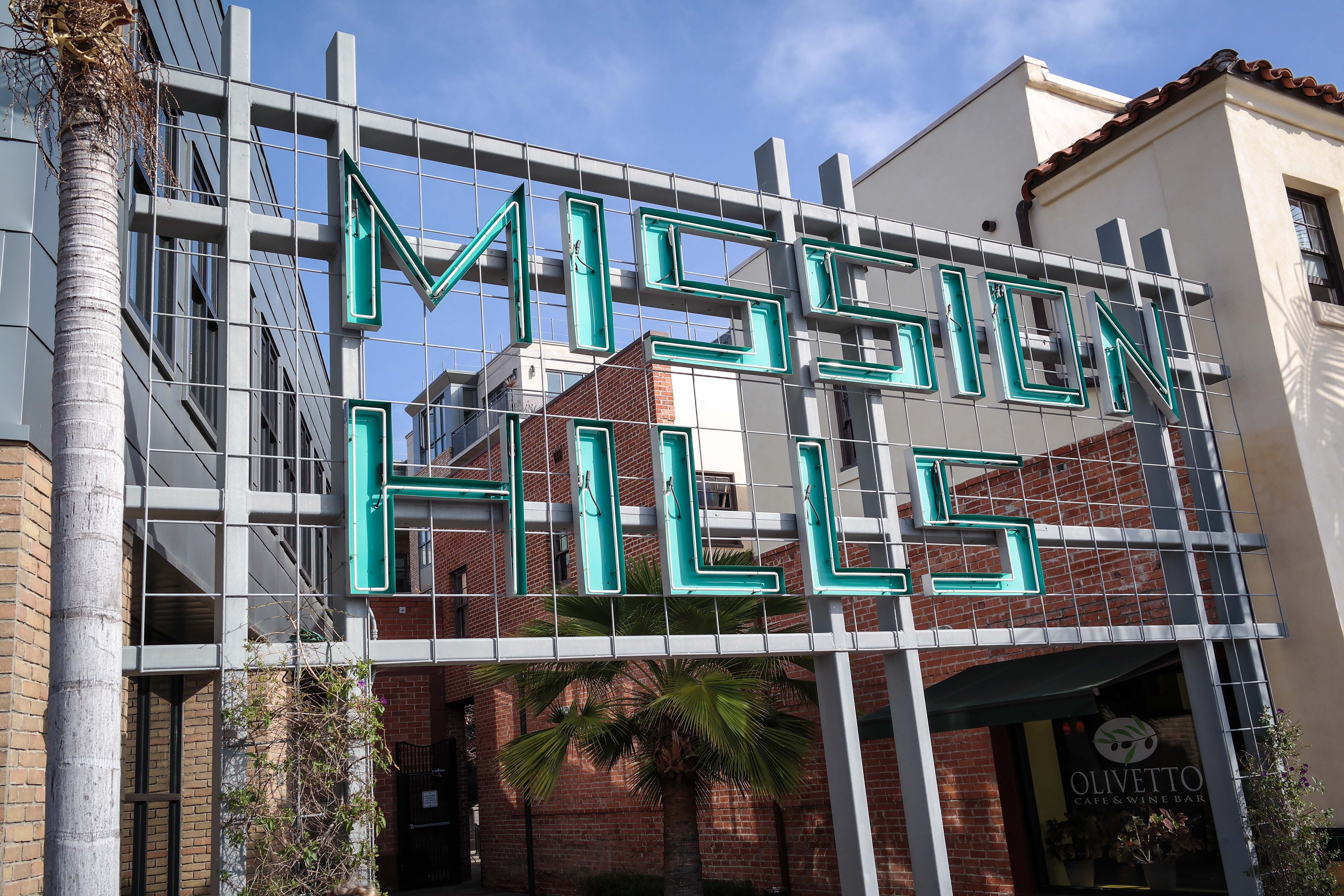
Historic Mission Hills sign at Paseo de Mission Hills in the historic neighborhood commercial district, Washington Street at Goldfinch

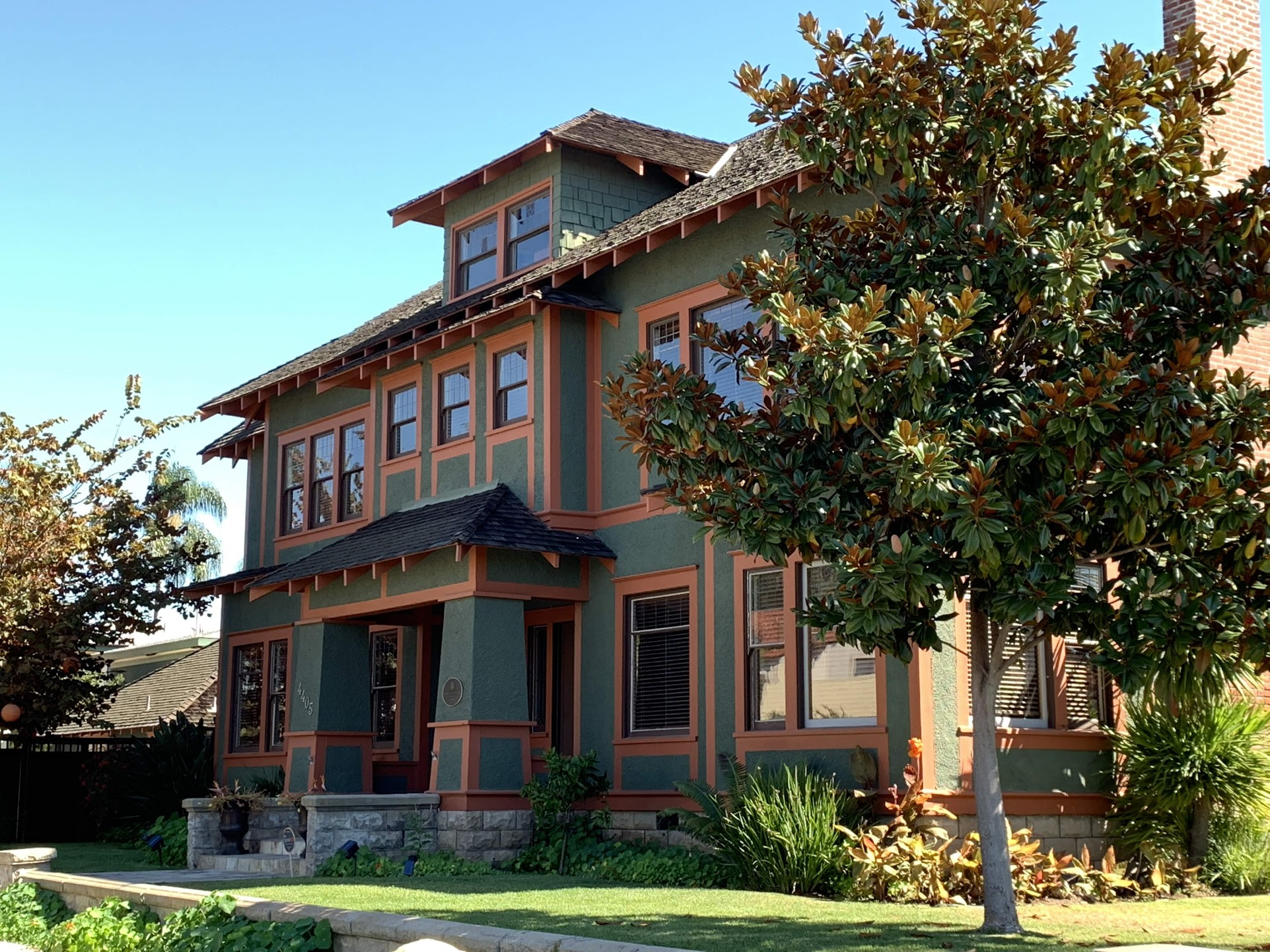
House in Prairie School style in Mission Hills

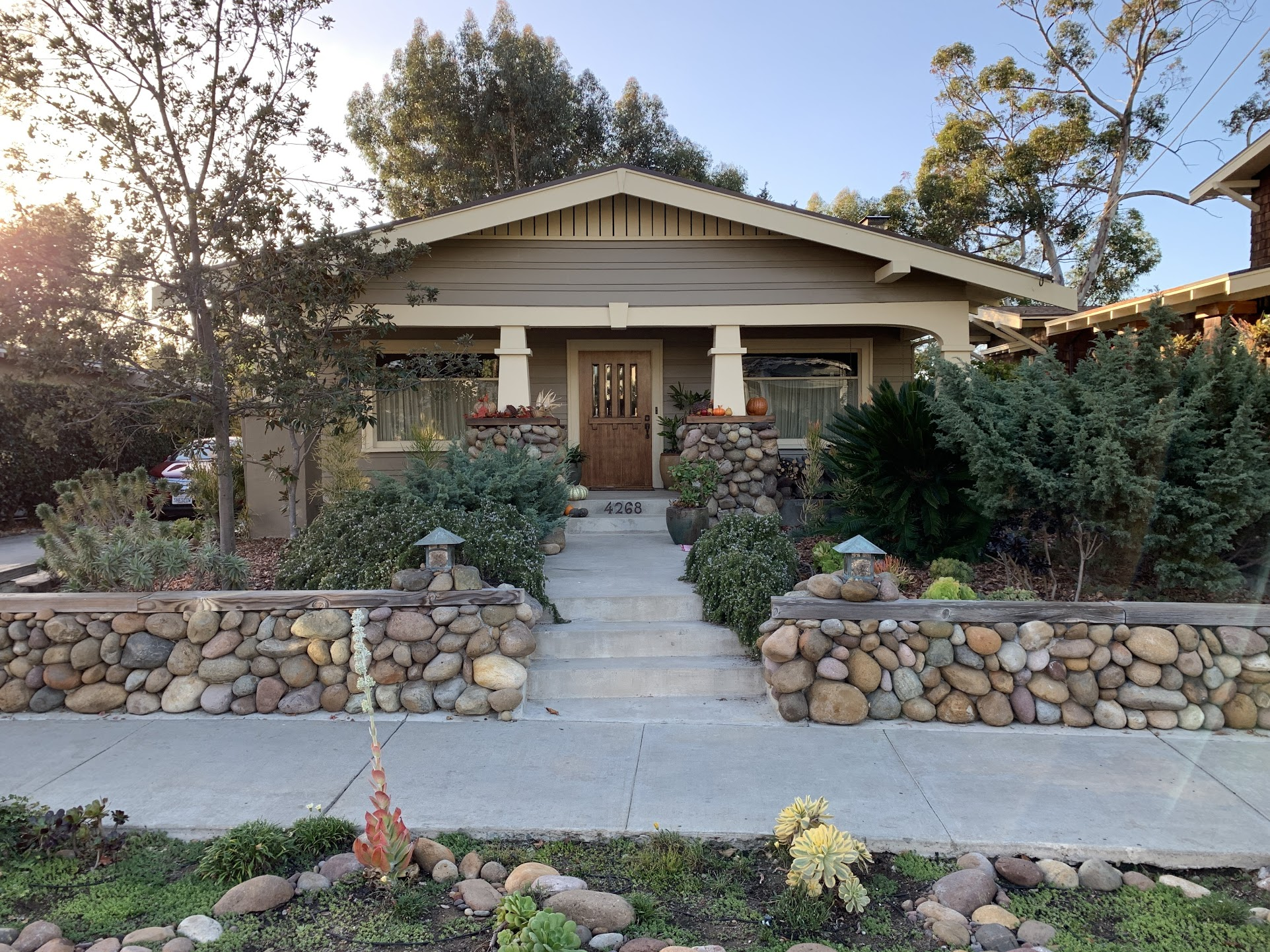
Craftsman bungalow in Mission Hills

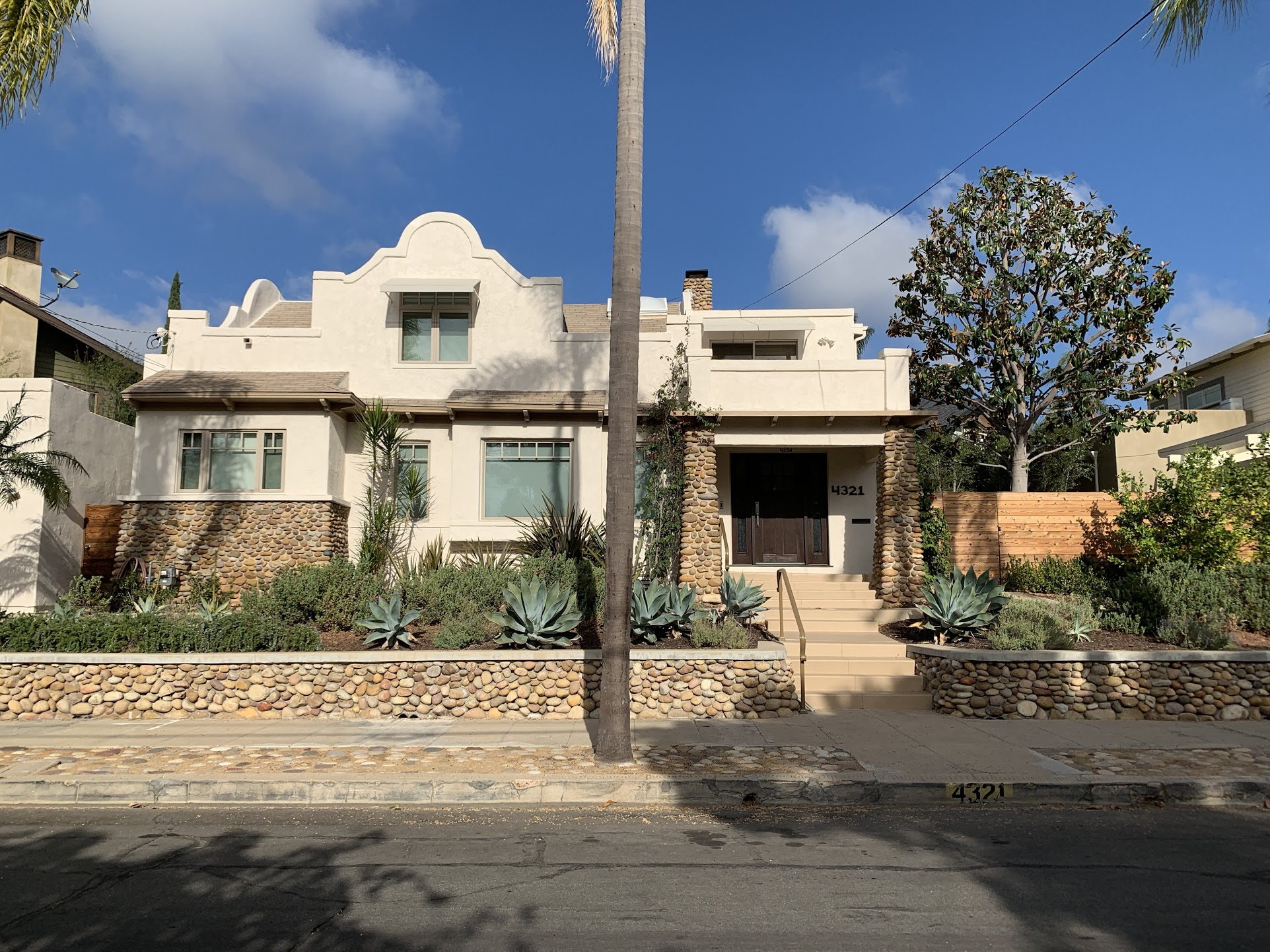
Spanish Colonial/Art Deco house in Mission Hills

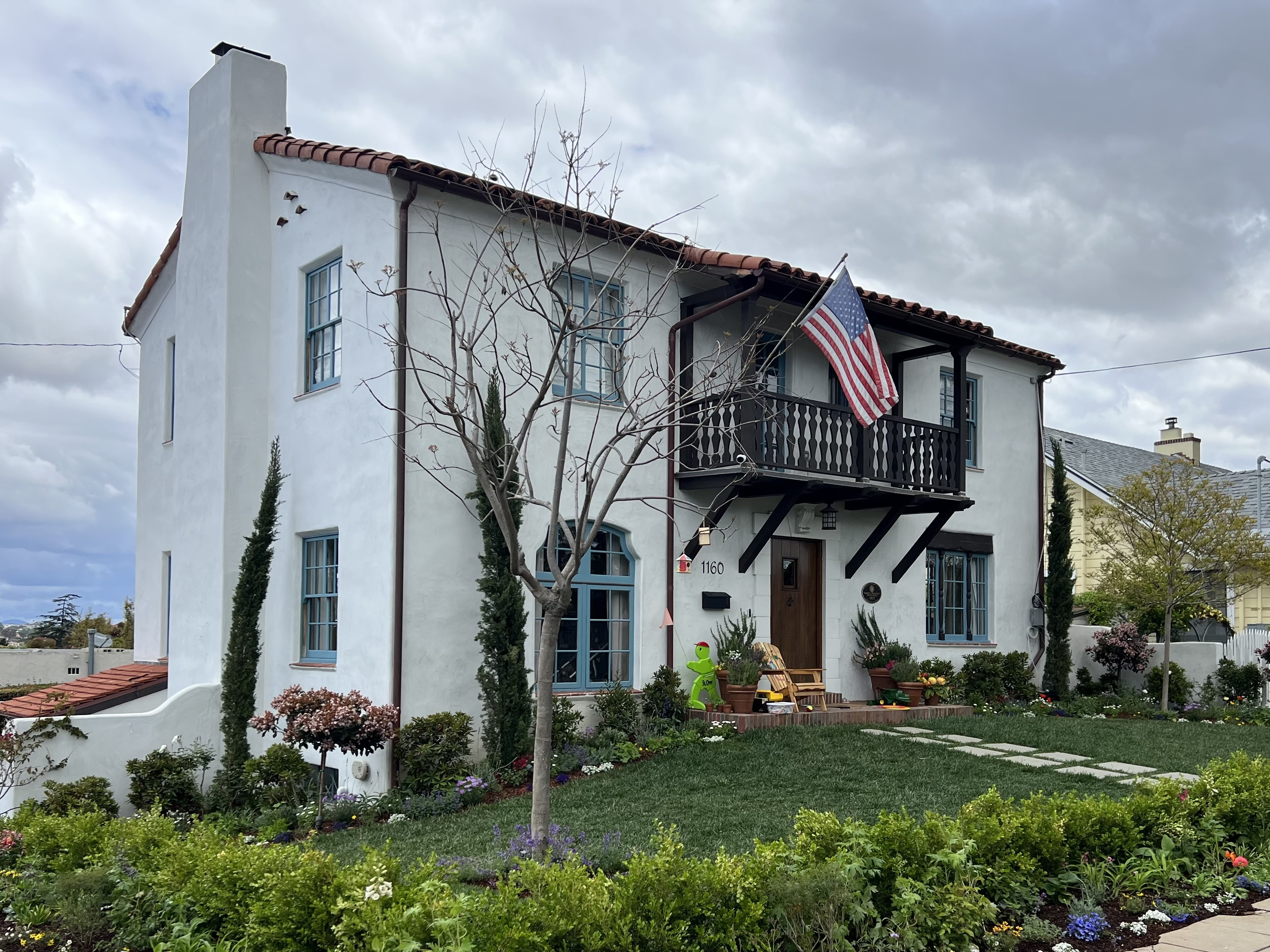
Spanish Colonial Revival house in Mission Hills

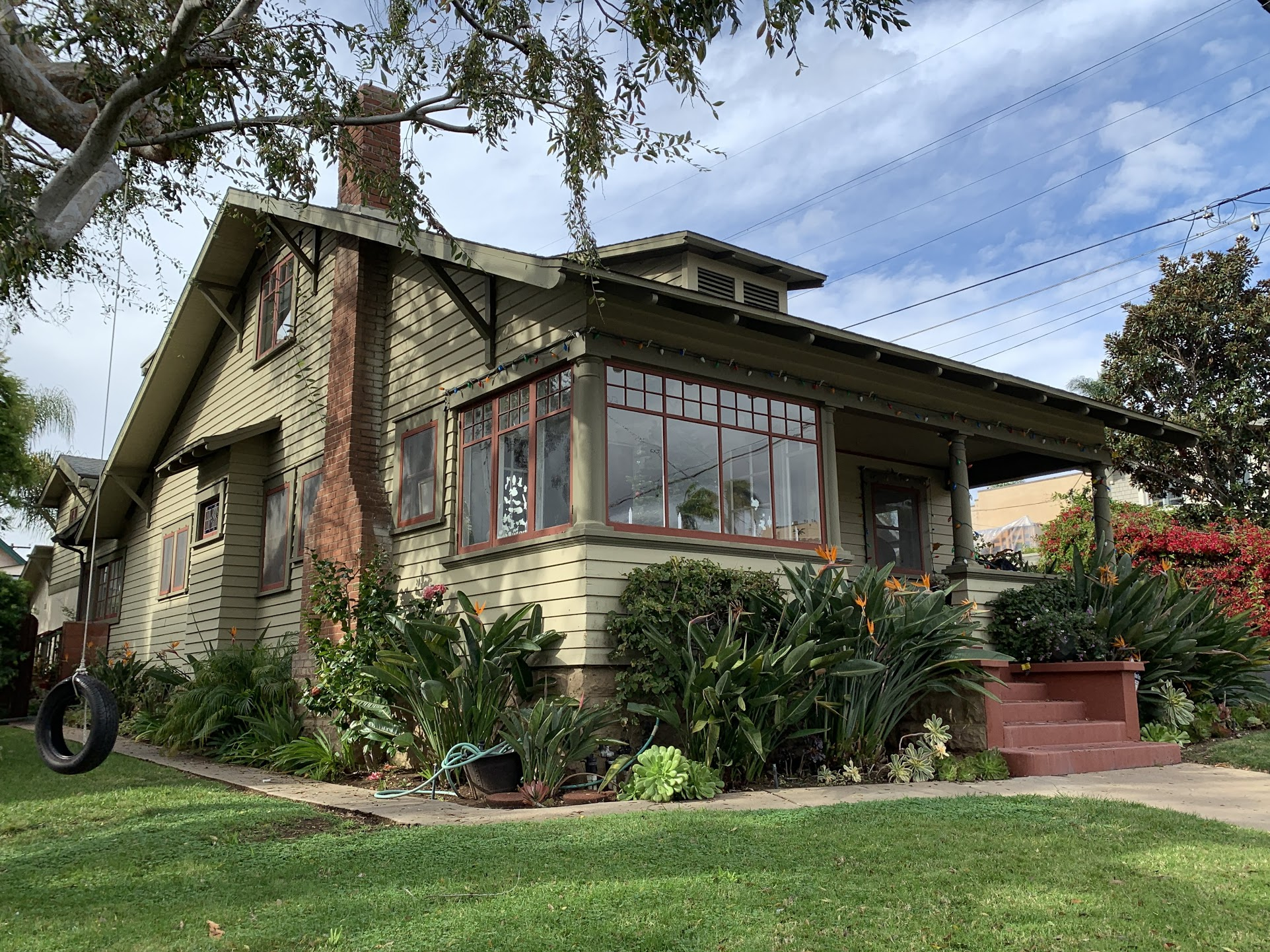
Bungalow in Mission Hills

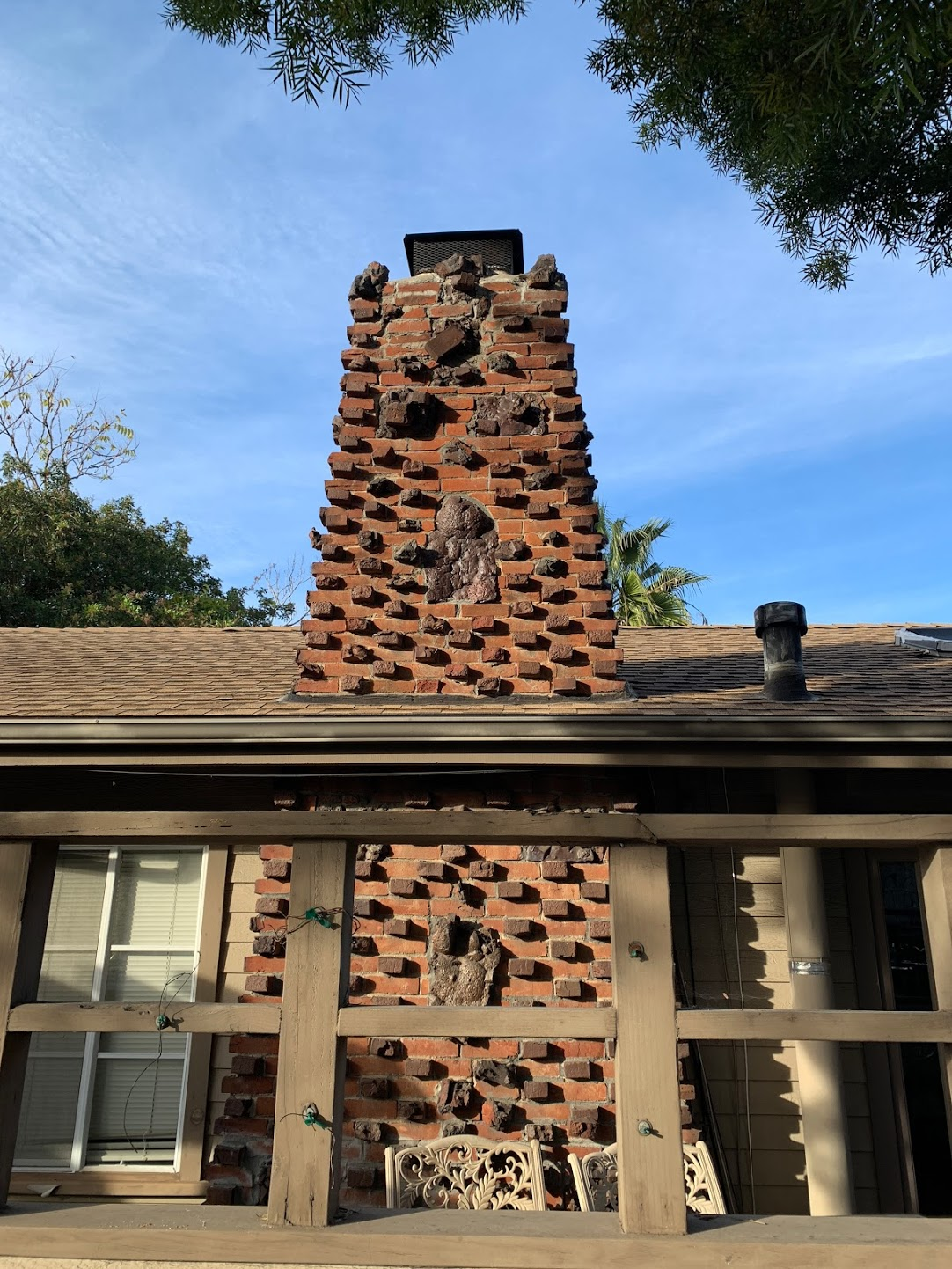
Chimney on Mission Hills residence

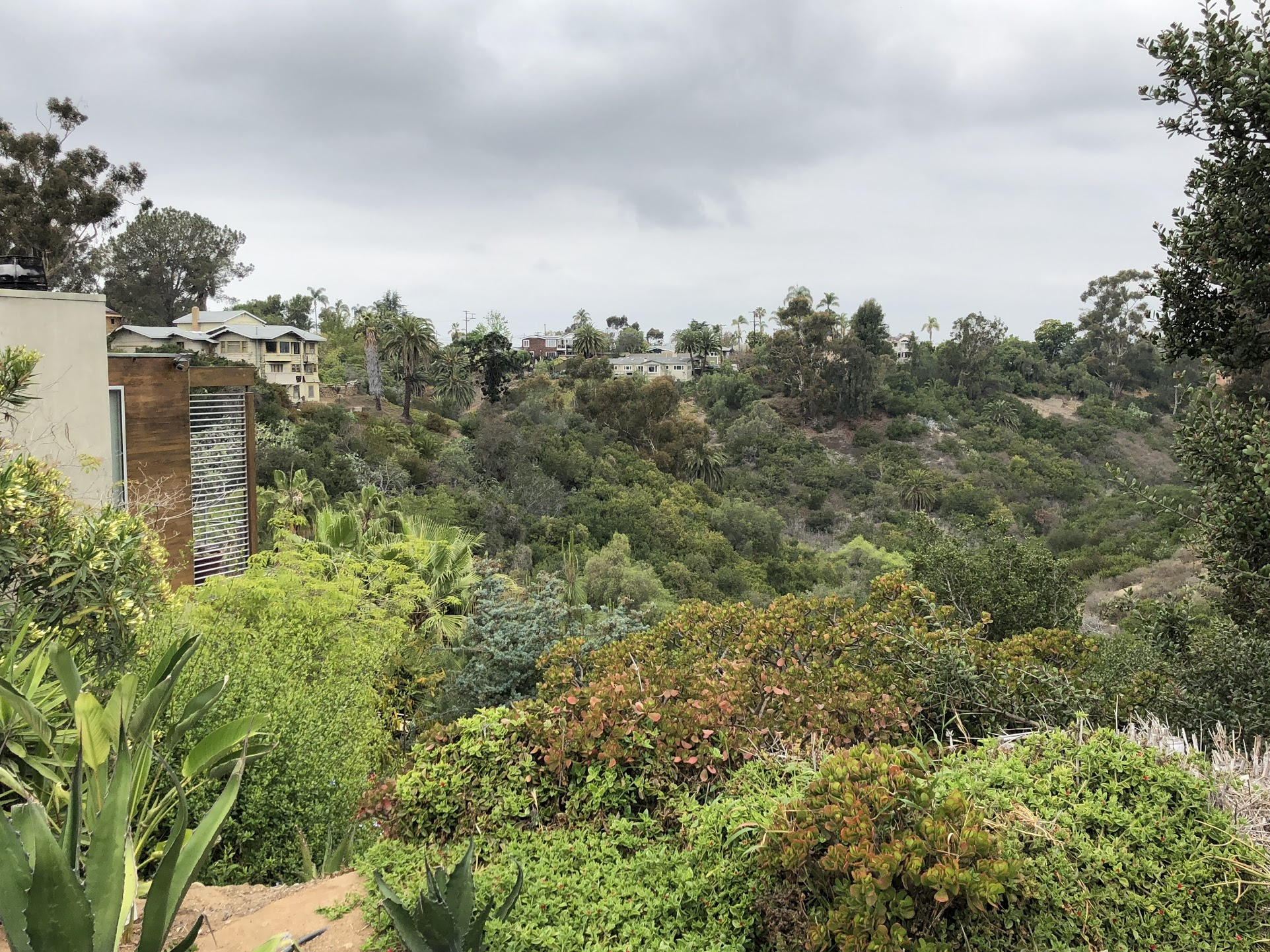
View to canyon from residential street in Mission Hills, San Diego

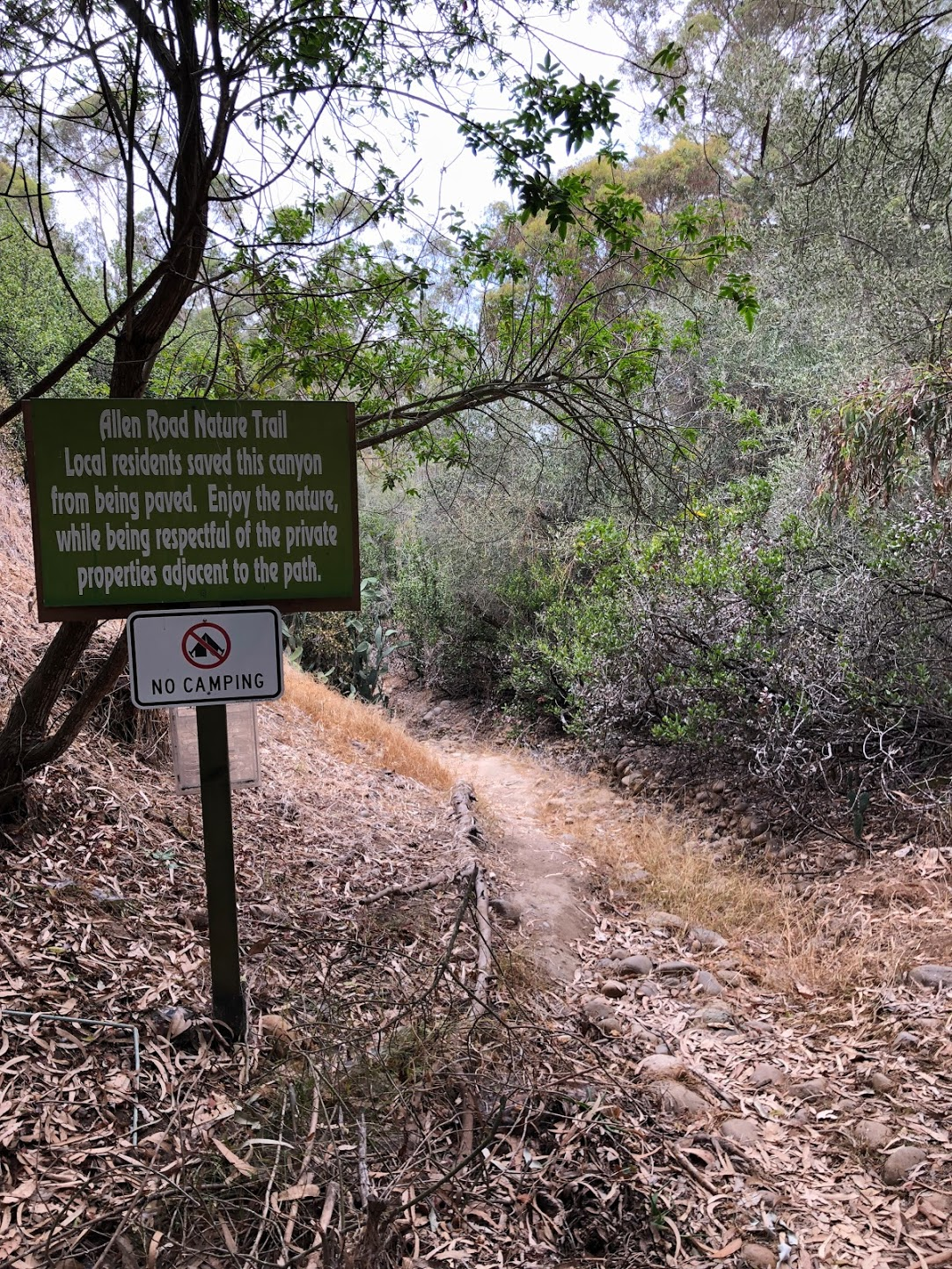
Allen Trail head, Mission Hills, San Diego

Mission Hills is a neighborhood in San Diego, California, United States. It is located on hills just south of the San Diego River valley and north of downtown San Diego and San Diego International Airport, overlooking downtown, Old Town, and San Diego Bay.

The area is primarily residential, with boutique shops and restaurants along Washington Street, in the West Lewis Shopping District, and in other clusters. The oldest parts of the neighborhood were subdivided according to George Marston's 1908 plan, and still consist mainly of houses from the 1908–1930 period, in vernacular, Craftsman, Prairie School, Spanish Colonial Revival and other styles.

== Location ==
The City of San Diego defines two areas, North Mission Hills and South Mission Hills with Washington Street as the dividing line. North Mission Hills is the area north of Washington Street and:

- East of Old Town
- West of Dove Street and Hillcrest
- South of Mission Valley

South Mission Hills is the area comprising historic subdivisions such as Middletown, Middletown Addition, South Florence Heights, Marine View, C.E Seaman, Osborn Hill and others, south of Washington Street and:

- East of India Street and Middletown
- North of Palm Street
- West of Reynard Way and Dove Street

Mission Hills shares the 92103 zip code with Hillcrest and is part of San Diego's Uptown community planning area.

== History ==
The area was developed in the early 20th century and most of the houses are still from that era, often carefully preserved and restored. Homes there were also often designed by San Diego's noted architects including William Hebbard, William Templeton Johnson, Emmor Brooke Weaver, Nathan Rigdon, Richard Requa, and Joel E. Brown. Master Builders such as the Pacific Building Company, Morris B. Irvin, and Martin V. Melhorn contributed by building in the vernacular architecture.

From 1910 till 1939, Mission Hills was connected by the Class 1 streetcars to the city by the San Diego Electric Railway's line 3, the Fort Stockton line, and the neighborhood bears its influence with classic streetcar suburb development including small clusters of commercial buildings where the streetcar stops once were.

The original historic neighborhood commercial district is around Washington and Goldfinch streets, two buildings (the 1913 Classical Revival style Ace Drugstore and the 1929 Spanish Colonial Revival style Funcheon Building) in which have been renovated as the "Paseo de Mission Hills" complex incorporating a historic "Mission Hills" sign.

Modern homes were built along canyon rims as infill during the 1950s and 1960s by modern masters such as Lloyd Ruocco, Homer Delawie, John Lloyd Wright and Sim Bruce Richards, among others. Ironically, San Diego's most famous architect, Irving Gill, never built in Mission Hills, as by the time this area was being developed he was mainly working in Los Angeles County.

The famous horticulturalist Kate Sessions helped to influence development in Mission Hills. She founded the Mission Hills Nursery, which is still an active business (since 1910).

== Streets ==
The main business streets are University Ave. and Washington St. Other major streets are Ft. Stockton Dr. and Sunset Blvd. Many cross streets ranging north to south are named for birds in alphabetical order from Albatross to Lark. Streetcar rail tracks were built along the main thoroughfares of the neighborhood, such as Fort Stockton Drive.

== Architecture and Historic Districts ==
Mission Hills contains two historic districts recognized by the City of San Diego:

- Fort Stockton Line Historic District
- Mission Hills Historic District

== Parks and culture ==
Pioneer Park and Mission Hills Park serve as two recreational parks within the neighborhood.

In January 2019, the San Diego Public Library opened the new 14,000-square-foot, Craftsman-style Mission Hills-Hillcrest/Harley & Bessie Knox Library at Washington and Front streets in Hillcrest. This replaced the former Mission Hills/Hillcrest Branch at Washington and Hawk streets.

Two of the neighborhood's many canyons are open to the public for hiking: Robyn's Egg Trail and the Allen Road Canyon Trail.

== Education ==
Public schools in Mission Hills are part of San Diego Unified School District. The public elementary school is Ulysses S. Grant Elementary School, which has grades K-8. Since there is no public high school in the neighborhood, students are given the choice of attending Point Loma High School or San Diego High School.

Several private and religious schools are located in Mission Hills. The best known is the lower school campus of the private Francis Parker School, founded in 1912. This school was run on progressive ideals by William Templeton Johnson and his wife, Clara. Mr. Johnson designed the original school building and his wife ran the school.

== See also ==
- Fort Stockton (San Diego, California)
