= Hillcrest, San Diego =

- Community of San Diego
- Hillcrest
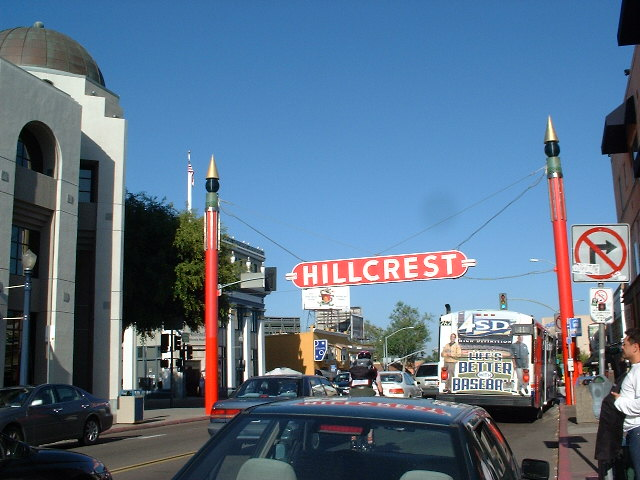
- The Hillcrest Sign at 5th and University Avenues

- Location within Central San Diego Hillcrest, San Diego (California) Hillcrest, San Diego (the United States)
- Coordinates: 32°45′N 117°10′W
- Country: United States of America
- State: California
- County: San Diego
- City: San Diego
- ZIP Code: 92103
- Area code: 619
- Website: http://www.FabulousHillcrest.com

Hillcrest is an uptown neighborhood in San Diego, California. The area is located north-northwest of Balboa Park, south of Interstate 8/Mission Valley, with Park Boulevard to the east (bordering North Park) and First Avenue to the west (bordering Mission Hills).

Hillcrest is known for its "tolerance and acceptance", its prevalent LGBT community presence, and its diversity of races, nationalities, genders, and social classes. It is, likewise, popular for its abundant locally owned businesses, stores, restaurants, cafés, bars, nightclubs, trendy thrift-stores, adult novelty shops and other independent specialty stores. Hillcrest has a distinctly "urban" feel, a high population density (compared to many other neighborhoods in San Diego), and is the city's main "gayborhood", in addition to the other uptown neighborhoods (surrounding Balboa Park).

== Geography ==
Hillcrest is an older, historical neighborhood that has experienced growth through gentrification. Most of the streets are lined with trees and abundant plants. There are several lush canyons and hiking paths throughout the area, such as Vermont Canyon (at the south end of Vermont Street) and Richmond Canyon, which is accessed via staircase one block south of Pennsylvania Street. Some of these trails have historical ties to the Boys & Girls Clubs of America, Girl Scouts and the Boy Scouts; there is a pedestrian-only bridge crossing highway CA-163, east–west, from Richmond Street to the neighborhood of Bankers Hill. There are many styles of buildings, including Craftsman homes and Mid-century modern condominium buildings.

The neighborhood is bounded by Mission Hills to the northwest, Bankers Hill and Balboa Park to the south, University Heights to the north, and North Park to the east. A large ridge overlooking San Diego Bay borders the neighborhood to the west.

Hillcrest is part of the Uptown community planning area, which consists of the neighborhoods of Mission Hills, Hillcrest, Bankers Hill, Park West, and University Heights.

== History ==
Initially, Hillcrest was a chaparral-covered mesa. Kumeyaay Indians inhabited numerous villages scattered throughout the San Diego region. Spanish colonization brought the first of twenty-nine California missions with the founding of the nearby San Diego Mission. Presidio Park in Mission Hills and Old Town just down the hill are a part of San Diego history.

In 1870, Mary Kearney obtained a deed from the city for the land that eventually became Hillcrest. In 1871 Arnold and D. Choate, two real estate developers, obtained that property. George Hill, a wealthy railroad tycoon, then purchased the land. Real estate development began in 1910 and the area was built out by 1920. During the 1920s and 1930s Hillcrest was considered a suburban shopping area for downtown San Diego.

In the 1910s, Hillcrest became one of the many San Diego neighborhoods connected by the Class 1 streetcars and an extensive San Diego public transit system that was spurred by the Panama–California Exposition of 1915 and built by John D. Spreckels. These streetcars became a fixture of this neighborhood until their retirement in 1939.

In 1940 the "HILLCREST" lighted sign at the intersection of University and Fifth Avenue was first erected, donated by the Hillcrest Women's Association, a group of local female shopkeepers. A similar sign appears in images dated c.1930. After falling into disrepair, it was taken down and rebuilt in 1984. The sign was retrofitted in 2023 from white to color lighting in 16 million hues with pre-programmed shows for various events and holidays. The sign was relit on February 21, 2023, in the purple, gold, and green colors to celebrate Mardi Gras.

After World War II, Hillcrest was left with an aging infrastructure and population.

During the 1970s, gays and lesbians began to establish residences, businesses, and organizations in Hillcrest.

=== Notable events ===
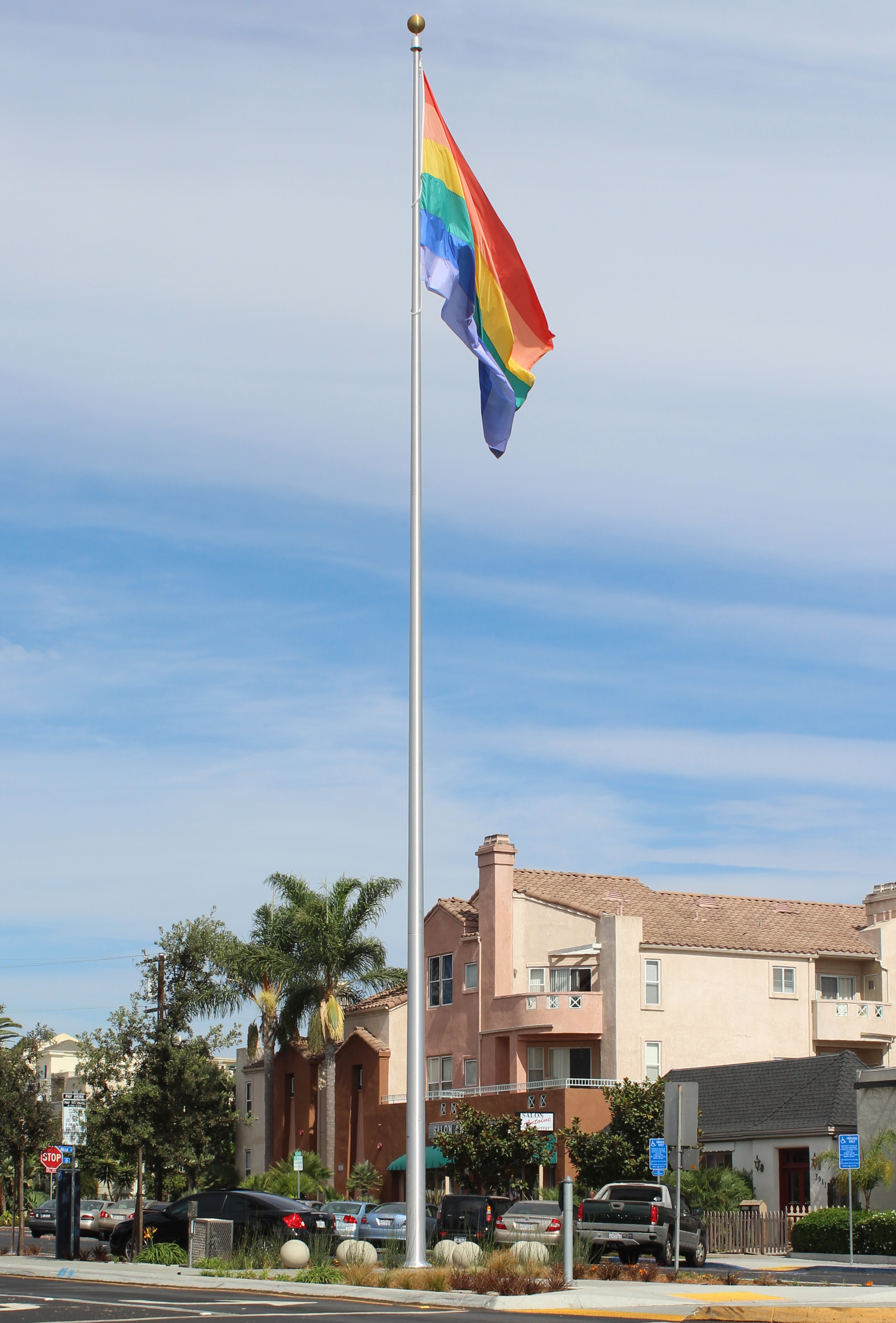
The Hillcrest Pride flag, erected in 2012, is located in the median on Normal Street near the intersection with University Avenue.

- 1974: Protesting the city's refusal of a parade permit, 200 gays and lesbians marched through the streets of downtown for the first time.
- 1975: The first city-permitted gay pride parade was held.
- 1980: The Center for Social Services, founded in Golden Hill in 1973—now called the Lesbian, Gay, Bisexual, and Transgender Community Center, and generally known as "the Center"—moved to Hillcrest.
- 1984: The Hillcrest Business Association, a business improvement district, was formed.
- 1985: The Hillcrest Business Association hosted the first CityFest.
- 1994: A new Vermont Street pedestrian bridge was completed. The span, featuring public art, cost $1.2 million.
- 2001: Mercy Garden, formerly the Sisters of Mercy Convent, was remodeled for use by the HIV-positive community.
- 2007: On August 2, yearlong centennial events were held, including a 100th birthday cake served to the public on August 2 and a champagne gala at The Prado's Grand Ballroom in October.
- 2007: The Hillcrest Town Council was formed.
- 2012: The city approved plans for a large, privately funded rainbow flag at the corner of University Avenue and Normal Street. The city also approved a change in a street name from Blaine Avenue to Harvey Milk Street.
- 2019: On February 12, a man fired more than a dozen shots into the Golden Dragon Asian Bistro on University Avenue near the Hillcrest sign. No one was injured. Stefano Markell Parker was judged not fit to stand trial for thirteen counts of premeditated murder. He was sentenced to two years psychiatric treatment at Patton State Hospital.
- 2020: In January, a rainbow crosswalk was unveiled at the intersection of Normal and University.
- 2022: The Hillcrest Community Foundation began raising funds in July to renovate the Hillcrest Sign as its components had started to degrade and the foundation determined that "the entire sign needs to be renovated".
- 2023: The Hillcrest Sign was taken down on January 31 so it could be repaired and renovated and was back in place February 21.
- 2025: The Hillcrest Pride Promenade broke ground on February 16, 2025. The Pride Promenade will expand upon the current Pride Plaza. The project involves turning the west side lanes of Normal Street into pedestrian walkways and rainbow-colored bike paths. The east bound lanes will remain open to vehicular traffic. The project also includes a children's play area, historic lamp posts, seating, 13 new parking spots, and 115 new trees. The project will cost almost $30 million with funding from the City of San Diego, San Diego Association of Governments (SANDAG), and parking meter revenue. The entire project is expected to be completed in late 2026.

== Demographics ==
The 2000 Census showed that the neighborhood's residents had a median age of 39 and that 49.3% had college degrees.

The 2000 Census indicates median family income in 1999 was $61,741 ($80,011 in 2010 inflation adjusted dollars).

The US Census did not record sexual orientation until 2020, but in the 2000 census, of the ~10% of households headed by unmarried couples in Hillcrest (zip code 92103), 43% were headed by two people of the same sex, an indication that they may be gay or lesbian couples. That indicates that more than 4% of all households in Hillcrest are headed by two unmarried people of the same sex.

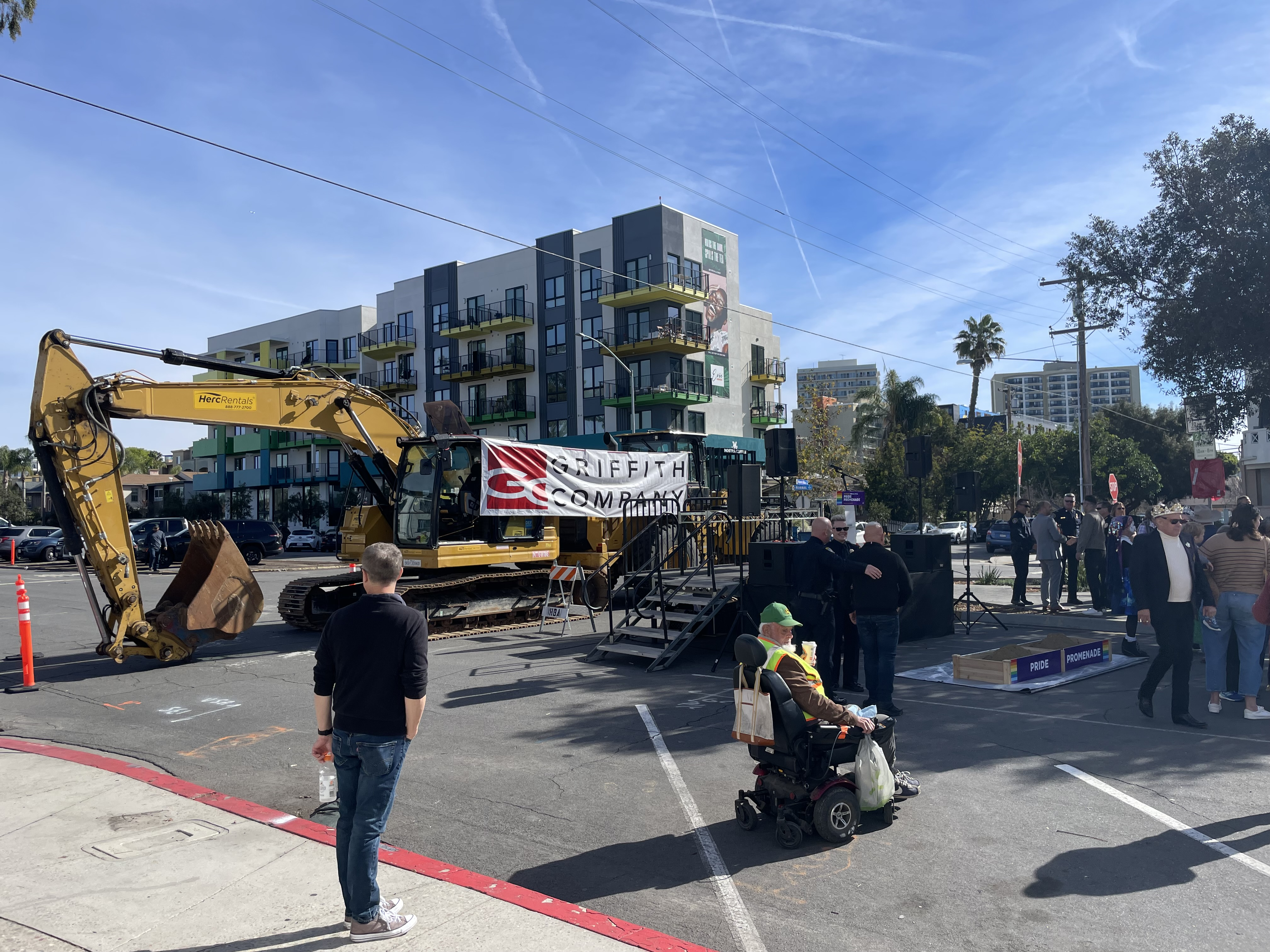
Groundbreaking ceremony for the Pride Promenade on Normal Street in February 2025

== Government ==
The neighborhood is governed by the elected officials of the city of San Diego. It is part of the San Diego City Council's Third district; the current councilmember is Stephen Whitburn, who replaced Chris Ward in the 2020 election as Ward moved to the California State Assembly. Ward previously replaced Todd Gloria in the Third District seat when Gloria was elected to the Assembly seat now held by Ward in 2016. This makes Stephen Whitburn the fifth consecutively elected openly LGBT representative of District 3 since the election of Chris Kehoe in 1993.

The Uptown Planners is an elected planning group composed of residents, property owners, and business people from the Uptown area, which includes Hillcrest; it advises the city on land use and other issues.

An ad hoc town council provides a conduit for information from citizens with the government. The Hillcrest Town Council is an organization of local residents that was formed in 2007. It meets monthly. Its mission statement is "To provide a voice & enhance the quality of life for Hillcrest renters & homeowners while supporting actions that benefit our neighborhood."

== Economy ==
The Hillcrest Business Association has existed since 1921; in 1984 it became a city-approved Business Improvement District. The association supports most beautification projects in the neighborhood, stewards the iconic Hillcrest sign, organizes street festivals, runs the Hillcrest Farmers Market, and it sponsors the annual "Taste of Hillcrest," which offers food and drink samples from over 50 local bars and restaurants.

In 2012 the Hillcrest Business Association, with the support of many business people, created the Hillcrest Pride Flag.

The commercial area of Hillcrest is noted for its many restaurants. Scripps Mercy Hospital and the UC San Diego Medical Center are located here.

== Transportation ==
Hillcrest is a walkable neighborhood with cafés, restaurants, and shops near the main residential pockets.

=== Transit ===
The neighborhood is served by the 1, 3, 7, 10, 11, 120 and 215 bus lines from the San Diego Metropolitan Transit System.

=== Road ===
Hillcrest is served by State Route 163 at the University Avenue, Washington Street and Robinson Avenue exits. University Avenue and Washington Street are the major east–west thoroughfares in Hillcrest; Fourth, Fifth and Sixth Avenues connect Hillcrest to downtown San Diego through Park West and Bankers Hill.

=== Parking ===
Hillcrest has dozens of public parking structures including garages, lots, and spots along most streets. The uptown neighborhoods of Hillcrest, Mission Hills, and Bankers Hill are managed by a community parking district, created in 1997. It was initially managed by a local nonprofit organization called the Uptown Partnership, which received a portion of the income from area parking meters, amounting to about $700,000 per year. This money was meant to be used to improve parking availability, traffic circulation, transit effectiveness, and pedestrian mobility. After 12 years and $2.5 million, the Partnership had created 50 new parking spaces, leading to criticism from a county Grand Jury and calls from the community to abolish it. The Uptown Partnership withdrew from managing the parking district in 2010.

After several years of inactivity, during which revenue was collected but not spent, the Uptown Community Parking District was revived in 2012 with a new board of directors and a new operations manager. In 2013 the parking district introduced a free trolley that runs along main streets on Thursday, Friday and Saturday evenings. There is also a website, AccessHillcrest, which helps people find parking spaces, share rides, or bicycle.

== Culture ==
Hillcrest "CityFest" is an annual street festival which features food, live entertainment, a beer garden and street vendors. Other regular events in Hillcrest include a weekly farmers market on the grounds of the local Department of Motor Vehicles, a Book Fair and Mardi Gras.

Finest City Improv, an improvisational theater, moved from North Park to Hillcrest in 2019.

The Rail, San Diego's oldest gay bar, is featured in the 2018 documentary San Diego's Gay Bar History.

The neighborhood's only movie theater, an art-house cinema owned by Landmark Cinema, which opened in 1991, closed in early January 2025.

=== Pride Festival ===
San Diego Pride is an annual celebration each July for the lesbian, gay, bisexual and transgender (LGBT) community. It features the Pride Parade on a Saturday morning, preceded by the Hillcrest Block Party on Friday night and followed by a two-day festival in Balboa Park. It is sponsored by San Diego LGBT Pride and is considered to be the largest civic event in the city of San Diego. The large rainbow flag approved in May 2012 was erected in time for the 2012 Pride Festival.
