= Motel =

Hotel catering to motorists

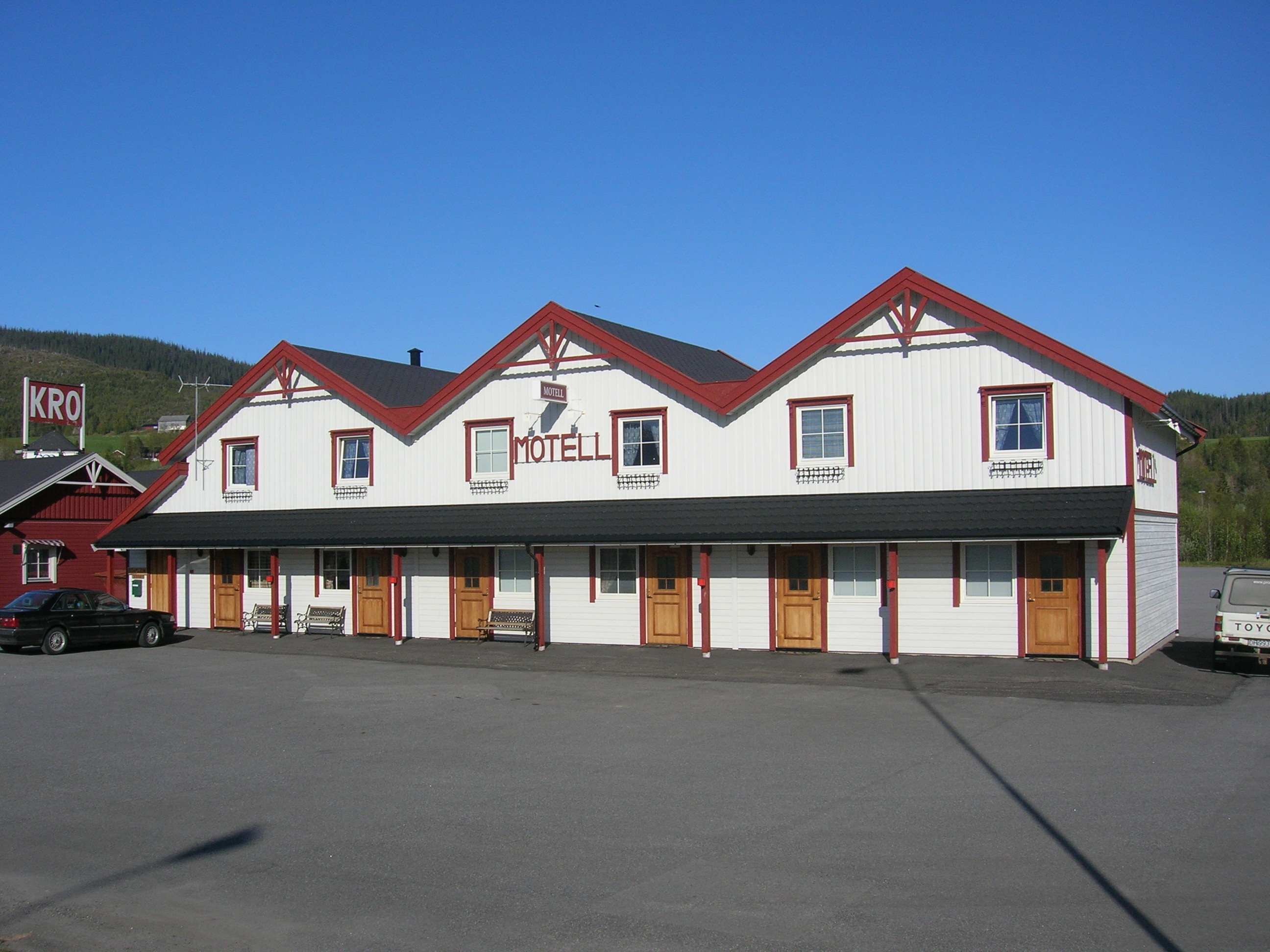
A motel in Bjerka, Norway

A motel, also known as a motor hotel, motor inn or motor lodge, is a hotel designed for motorists, usually having each room entered directly from the parking area for motor vehicles rather than through a central lobby. Entering dictionaries after World War II, the word motel, coined as a portmanteau of "motor hotel", originates from the defunct lodging compound establishment, Milestone Mo-Tel in San Luis Obispo, California (later renamed "Motel Inn"), which was built in 1925. The term motel referred to a type of hotel consisting of a single building of connected rooms whose doors faced a parking lot and in some circumstances, a common area or a series of small cabins with common parking. Motels are often individually owned, though motel chains do exist.

As large highway systems began to be developed in the 1920s, long-distance road journeys became more common, and the need for inexpensive, easily accessible overnight accommodation sites close to the main routes led to the growth of the motel concept. Motels peaked in popularity in the 1960s with rising car travel, only to decline in response to competition from the newer chain hotels that became commonplace at highway interchanges as traffic was bypassed onto newly constructed freeways. Several historic motels are listed on the US National Register of Historic Places.

== Architecture ==
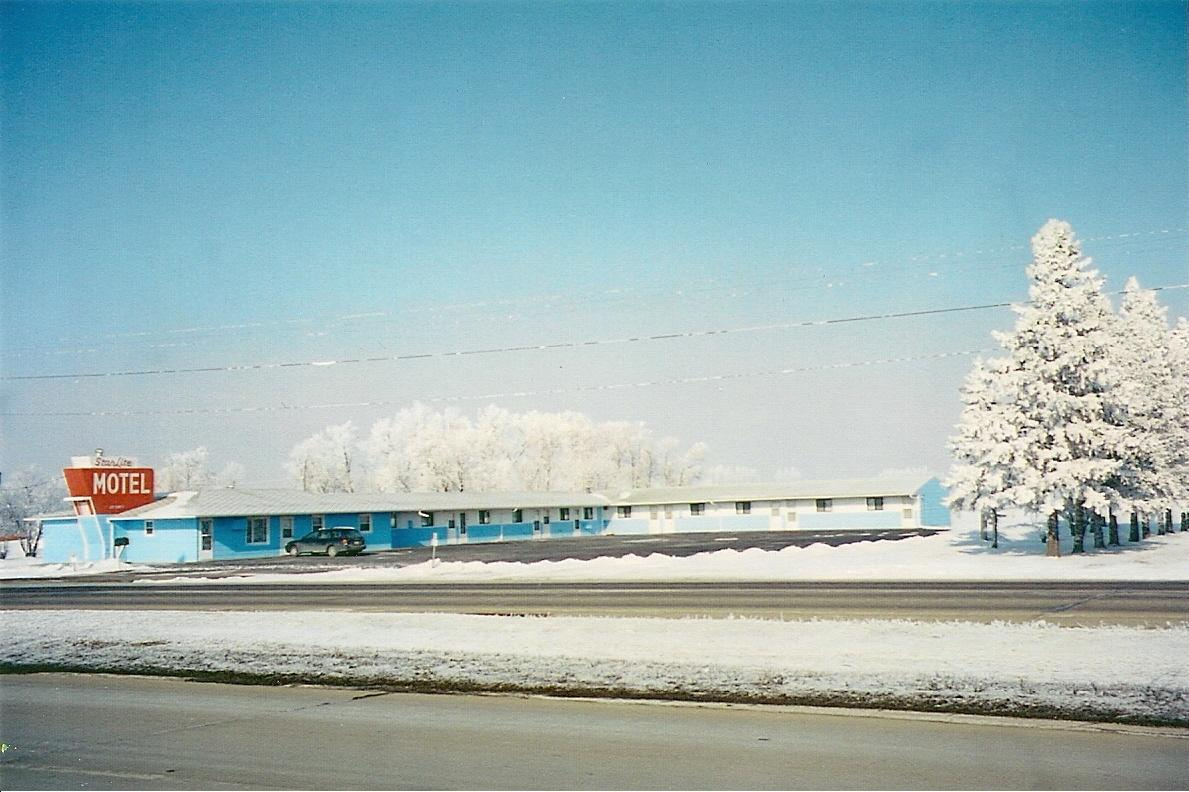
The Star Lite Motel in Dilworth, Minnesota is a typical American 1950s L-shaped motel.

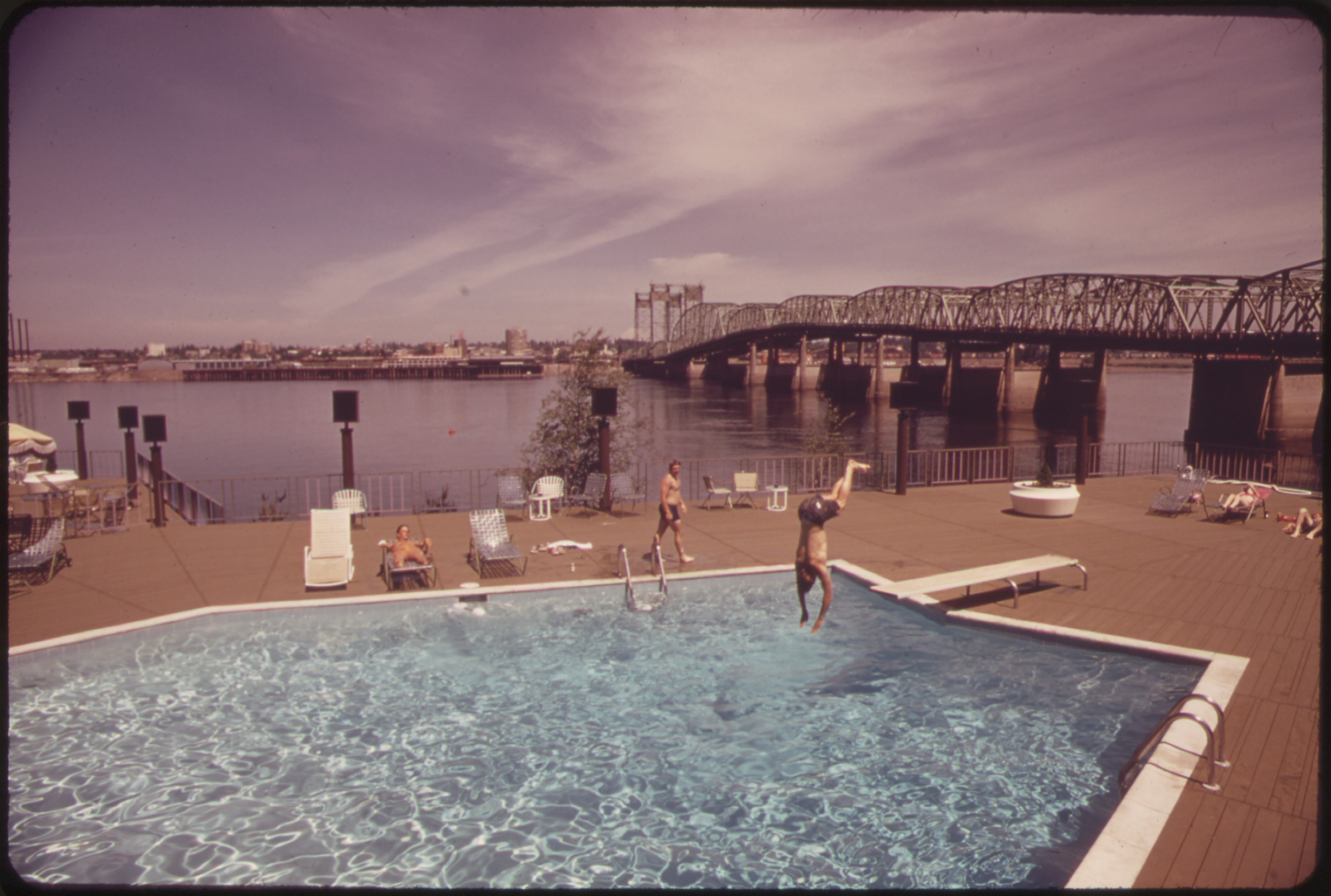
A large pool at the Thunderbird Motel on the Columbia River in Portland, Oregon (1973).

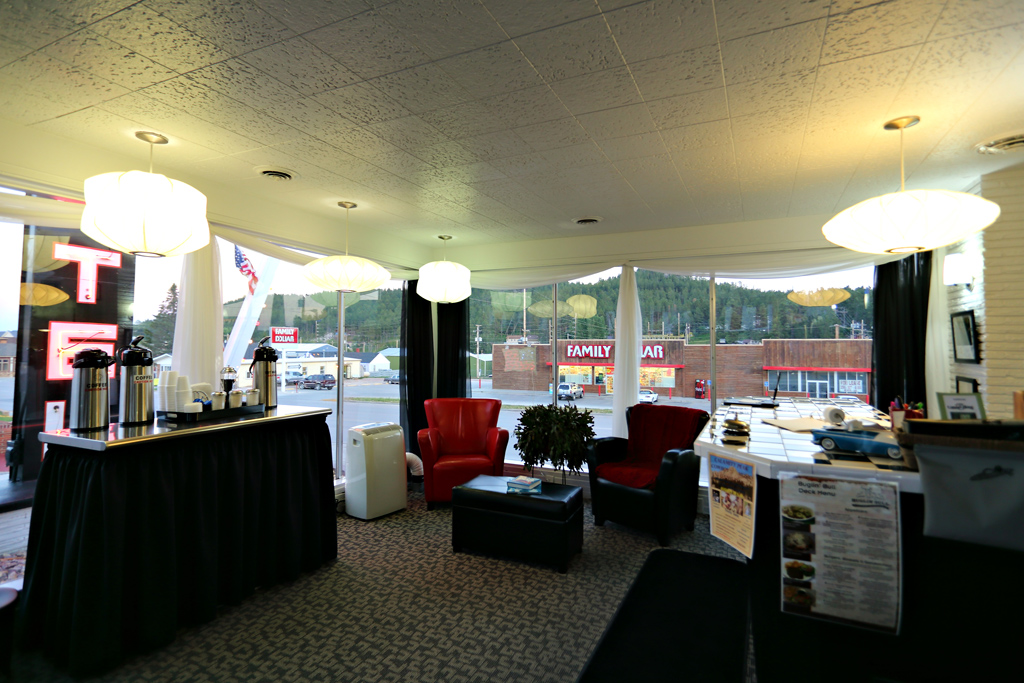
A typical motel lobby at the Rocket Motel in Custer, South Dakota

Motels differ from hotels in their location along highways, as opposed to the urban cores favored by hotels, and their orientation to the outside (in contrast to hotels, whose doors typically face an interior hallway). Motels almost by definition include a parking lot, while older hotels were not usually built with automobile parking in mind.

Because of their low-rise construction, the number of rooms which would fit on any given amount of land was low compared to the high-rise urban hotels which had grown around train stations. This was not an issue in an era where the major highways became the main street in every town along the way and inexpensive land at the edge of town could be developed with motels, car dealerships, fuel stations, lumber yards, amusement parks, roadside diners, drive-in restaurants, theaters, and countless other small roadside businesses. The automobile brought mobility and the motel could appear anywhere on the vast network of two-lane highways.

=== Layout ===
Motels are typically constructed in an I-, L-, or U-shaped layout that includes guest rooms; an attached manager's office; a small reception; and in some cases, a small diner and a swimming pool. A motel was typically single-story with rooms opening directly onto a parking lot, making it easy to unload suitcases from a vehicle. A second story, if present, would face onto a balcony served by multiple stairwells.

The post-war motels, especially in the early 1950s to late 1960s, sought more visual distinction, often featuring eye-catching colorful neon signs which employed themes from popular culture, ranging from Western imagery of cowboys and Indians to contemporary images of spaceships and atomic era iconography. U.S. Route 66 is the most popular example of the "neon era". Many of these signs remain in use to this day.

=== Room types ===
In some motels, a handful of rooms would be larger and contain kitchenettes or apartment-like amenities; these rooms were marketed at a higher price as "efficiencies" as their occupants could prepare food themselves instead of incurring the cost of eating all meals in restaurants. Rooms with connecting doors (so that two standard rooms could be combined into one larger room) also commonly appeared in both hotels and motels. A few motels (particularly in Niagara Falls, Ontario, where a motel strip extending from Lundy's Lane to the falls has long been marketed to newlyweds) would offer "honeymoon suites" with extra amenities such as whirlpool baths.

== History ==
The first campgrounds for automobile tourists were constructed in the late 1910s. Before that, tourists who couldn't afford to stay in a hotel either slept in their cars or pitched their tents in fields alongside the road. These were called auto camps. The modern campgrounds of the 1920s and 1930s provided running water, picnic grounds, and restroom facilities.

=== Auto camps and courts ===
Auto camps predated motels by a few years, established in the 1920s as primitive municipal camp sites where travelers pitched their own tents. As demand increased, for-profit commercial camps gradually displaced public campgrounds.

Until the first travel trailers became available in the 1930s, auto tourists adapted their cars by adding beds, makeshift kitchens and roof decks. The next step up from the travel trailer was the cabin camp, a primitive but permanent group of structures. During the Great Depression, landholders whose property fronted onto highways built cabins to convert unprofitable land to income; some opened tourist homes. The (usually single-story) buildings for a roadside motel or cabin court were quick and simple to construct, with plans and instructions readily available in how-to and builder's magazines.

Expansion of highway networks largely continued unabated through the depression as governments attempted to create employment, but the roadside cabin camps were primitive, basically just auto camps with small cabins instead of tents.

The 1935 City Directory for San Diego, California, lists "motel"-type accommodations under tourist camps. One initially could stay in the Depression-era cabin camps for less than a dollar per night, but small comforts were few and far between.

Travelers in search of modern amenities soon would find them at cottage courts and tourist courts. The price was higher, but the cabins had electricity, indoor bathrooms, and occasionally a private garage or carport. They were arranged in attractive clusters or a U-shape. Often, these camps were part of a larger complex containing a filling station, a café, and sometimes a convenience store. Facilities like the Rising Sun Auto Camp in Glacier National Park and Blue Bonnet Court in Texas were "mom-and-pop" facilities on the outskirts of towns that were as quirky as their owners. Auto camps continued in popularity through the Depression years and after World War II, their popularity finally starting to diminish with increasing land costs and changes in consumer demands.

In contrast, though they remained small independent operations, motels quickly adopted a more homogenized appearance and were designed from the start to cater purely to motorists.

=== Tourist homes ===
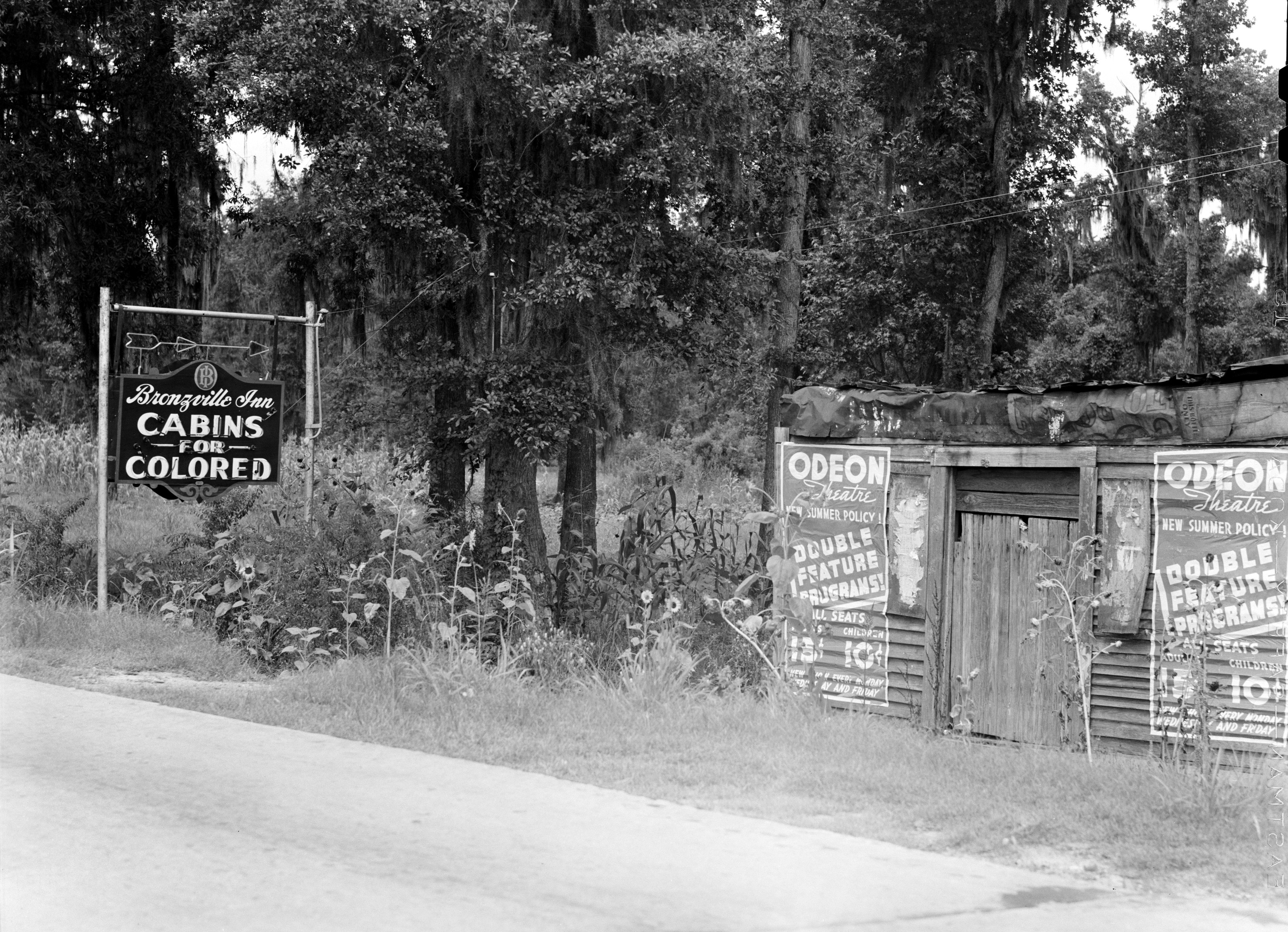
Cabins for Colored, 1939, South Carolina

In town, tourist homes were private residences advertising rooms for auto travelers. Unlike boarding houses, guests at tourist homes were usually just passing through. In the southwestern United States, a handful of tourist homes were opened by African Americans as early as the Great Depression due to the lack of food or lodging for travelers of color in the Jim Crow conditions of the era.

There were things money couldn't buy on Route 66. Between Chicago and Los Angeles you couldn't rent a room if you were tired after a long drive. You couldn't sit down in a restaurant or diner or buy a meal no matter how much money you had. You couldn't find a place to answer the call of nature even with a pocketful of money...if you were a person of color traveling on Route 66 in the 1940s and '50s.

— Irv Logan, Jr.

The Negro Motorist Green Book (1936–64) listed lodgings, restaurants, fuel stations, liquor stores, and barber and beauty salons without racial restrictions; the smaller Directory of Negro Hotels and Guest Houses in the United States (1939, U.S. Travel Bureau) specialized in accommodations. Segregation of U.S. tourist accommodation would legally be ended by the Civil Rights Act of 1964 and by a court ruling in Heart of Atlanta Motel v. United States affirming that Congress' powers over interstate commerce extend to regulation of local incidents (such as racial discrimination in a motel serving interstate travelers) which might substantially and harmfully affect that commerce.

=== Early motels ===
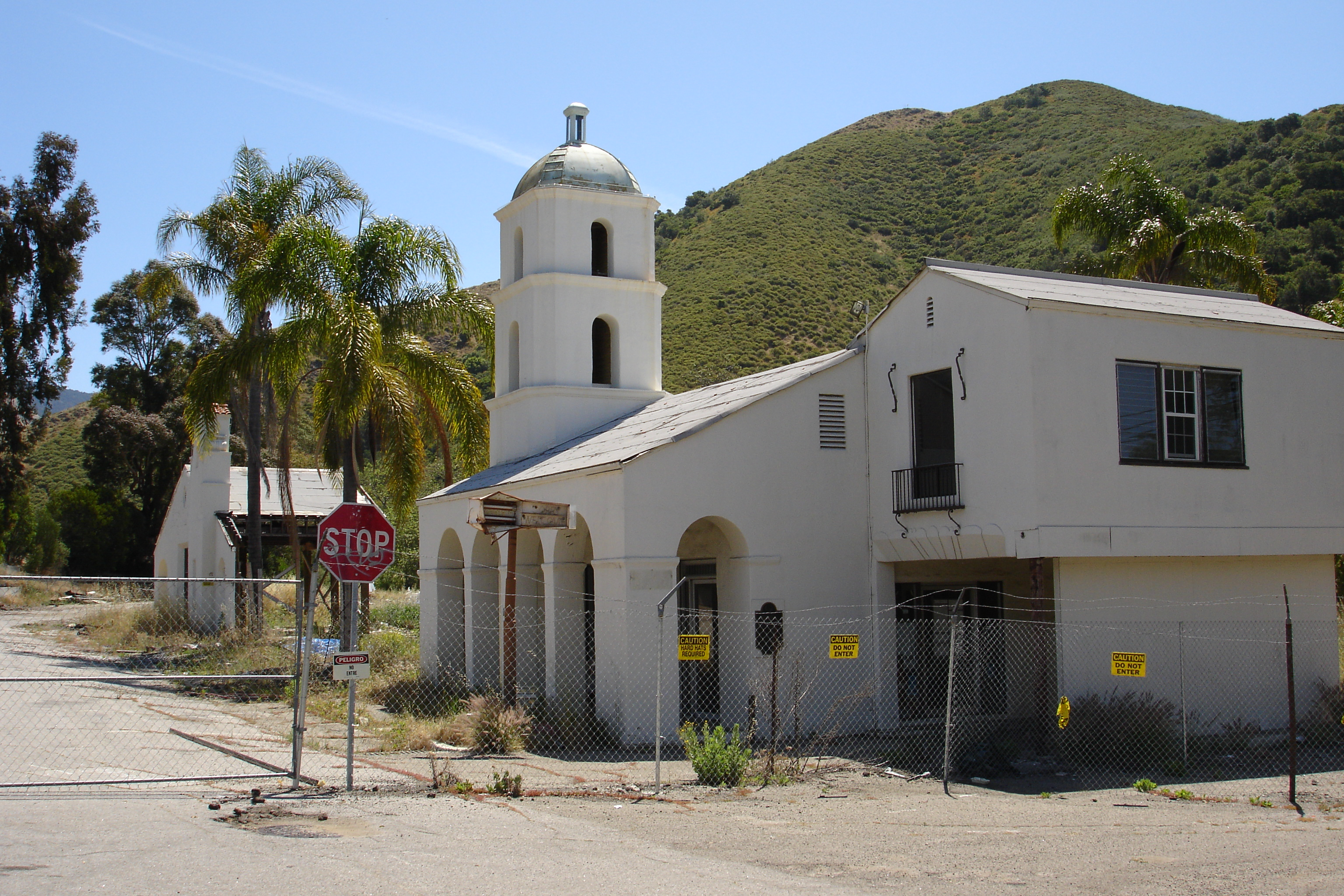
Arthur Heineman's Motel Inn of San Luis Obispo, California

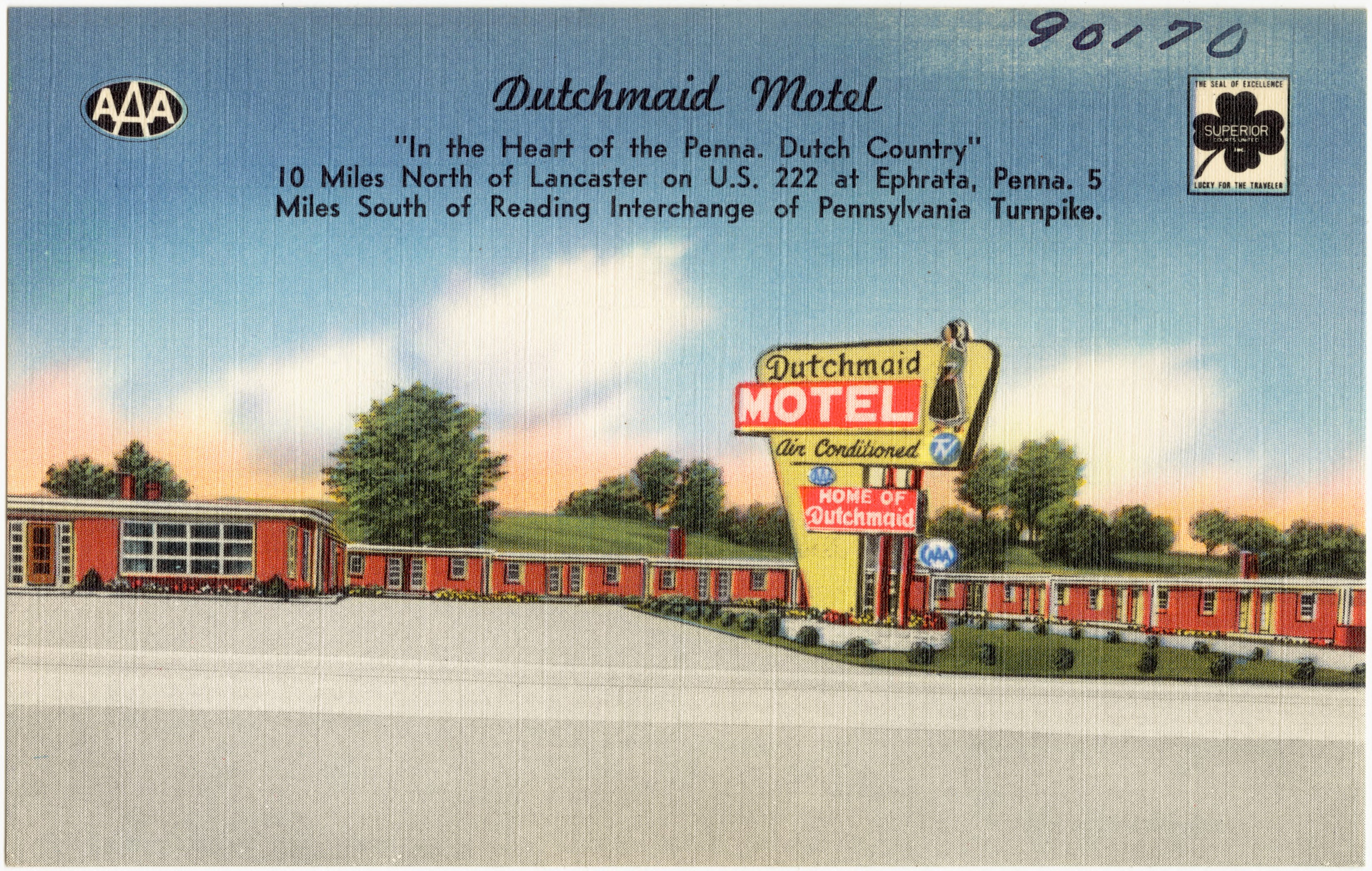
Dutchmaid Motel, 10 miles north of Lancaster, Pennsylvania

The term "motel" originated from a lodging establishment called "Milestone Mo-Tel" in San Luis Obispo, California, which was constructed in 1925 by Arthur Heineman. In conceiving of a name for his hotel, Heineman combined the two words motor hotel into one word as mo-tel, after he found that he could not fit the words "Milestone Motor Hotel" on the rooftop. Therefore, the word "motel" and literally the first motel was born. Many other similar businesses followed in its footsteps and started building their own auto camps, as well as calling themselves "motels". Later, as a result of failing to obtain a registered trademark for the word "Mo-Tel" or "motel", Milestone Mo-Tel was renamed simply as "Motel Inn".

Gateway Motel, Merced, California, photographed by John Margolies, 1987

Combining the individual cabins of the tourist court under a single roof yielded the motor court or motor hotel. A handful of motor courts were beginning to call themselves motels, a term coined in 1926. Many of these early motels are still popular and are in operation, as in the case of the 3V Tourist Court in St. Francisville, Louisiana, built in 1938.

During the Great Depression, those still traveling (including business travelers and traveling salespeople) were under pressure to manage travel costs by driving instead of taking trains and staying in the new roadside motels and courts instead of more costly established downtown hotels where bell captains, porters, and other personnel would all expect a tip for service.

In the 1940s, most construction ground to a near-halt as workers, fuel, rubber, and transport were pulled away from civilian use for the war effort. What little construction did take place was typically near military bases where every habitable cabin was pressed into service to house soldiers and their families.

The post-war 1950s ushered in a building boom on a massive scale. By 1947, approximately 22,000 motor courts were in operation in the U.S. alone; a typical 50-room motel in that era cost $3000 per room in initial construction costs, compared to $12,000 per room for metropolitan city hotel construction. By 1950 there were 50,000 motels serving half of the 22 million U.S. vacationers; a year later motels surpassed hotels in consumer demand. The industry peaked in 1964 with 61,000 properties and fell to 16,000 properties by 2012.

Many motels began advertising on colorful neon signs that they had "air cooling" (an early term for "air conditioning") during the hot summers or were "heated by steam" during the cold winters. A handful used novelty architecture such as wigwams or teepees.

=== Expansion ===
The 1950s and 1960s was the pinnacle of the motel industry in the United States and Canada. As older mom-and-pop motor hotels began adding newer amenities such as swimming pools or color TV (a luxury in the 1960s), motels were built in wild and impressive designs. In-room gimmicks such as the coin-operated Magic Fingers vibrating bed were briefly popular; introduced in 1958, these were largely removed in the 1970s due to vandalism of the coin boxes. The American Hotel Association (which had briefly offered a Universal Credit Card in 1953 as forerunner to the modern American Express card) became the American Hotel & Motel Association in 1963.

As many motels vied for their place on busy highways, the beach-front motel became a success. In major beach-front cities such as Jacksonville, Florida, Miami, Florida, and Ocean City, Maryland, rows of colorful motels such as the Castaways, in all shapes and sizes, became commonplace.

=== Guidebooks ===
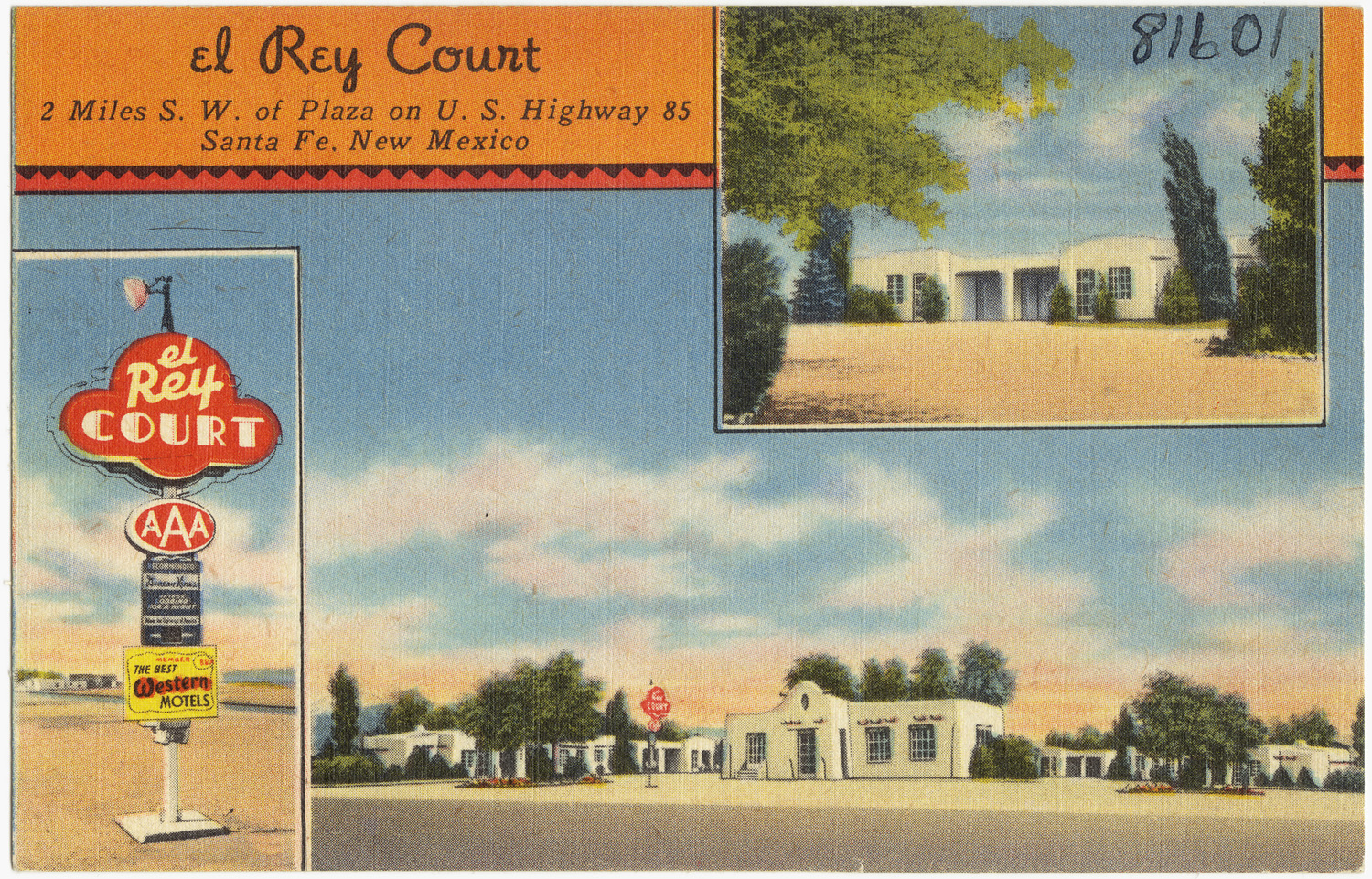
Guidebooks and referral chains featured in promotion for independent motels. El Rey Court in Santa Fe, New Mexico boasted American Automobile Association, Duncan Hines, and The Best Western Motels' approval.

The original motels were small, locally owned businesses which grew around two-lane highways which were main street in every town along the way. As independents, the quality of accommodation varied widely from one lodge to another; while a minority of these properties were inspected or rated by the American Automobile Association and Canadian Automobile Association (which have published maps and tour book directories of restaurants and rooms since 1917), no consistent standard stood behind the "sanitized for your protection" banner. There was no real access to national advertising for local motels and no nationwide network to facilitate reservation of a room in a distant city.

The main roads into major towns therefore became a sea of orange or red neon proclaiming VACANCY (and later COLOR TV, air conditioning, or a swimming pool) as competing operators vied for precious visibility on crowded highways. Other venues for advertising were local tourist bureaus and postcards provided for free use by clients.

A rating in the Directory of Motor Courts and Cottages by the American Automobile Association was just one of many credentials eagerly sought by independent motels of the era. Regional guides (such as Official Florida Guide by A. Lowell Hunt or Approved Travelers Motor Courts) and the food/lodging guidebooks published by restaurant reviewer Duncan Hines (Adventures in Good Eating, 1936 and Lodging for a Night, 1938) were also valued endorsements.

=== Referral chains ===
The referral chain in lodging originated in the early 1930s, originally serving to promote cabins and tourist courts. A predecessor of the modern "franchise chain" model, a referral chain was a group of independent motel owners in which each member lodge would voluntarily meet a set of standards and each property would promote the others. Each property would proudly display the group's name alongside its own.

United Motor Courts, founded in 1933 by a group of motel owners in the southwestern U.S., published a guidebook until the early 1950s. A splinter of this now-defunct group, Quality Courts, began as a referral chain in 1941, but was converted to a franchised operation (Quality Inn) in the 1960s. Budget Host and Best Value Inn are also referral chains.

Best Western (1946) was a similar referral chain of independent western U.S. motels. It remains in operation as a member-owned chain, although the modern Best Western operation shares many of the characteristics (such as centralized purchasing and reservation systems) of the later franchise systems.

=== Ownership chains ===
The earliest motel chains, proprietary brands for multiple properties built with common architecture, were born in the 1930s. The first of these were ownership chains, in which a small group of people owned and operated all of the motels under one common brand.

Alamo Plaza Hotel Courts, founded 1929 in East Waco, Texas, was the first such chain with seven motor courts by 1936 and more than twenty by 1955. With Simmons furniture, Beautyrest mattresses on every bed, and telephones in every room, the Alamo Plaza rooms were marketed as "tourist apartments" under a slogan of "Catering to those who care."

In 1935, building contractor Scott King opened King's Motor Court in San Diego, California, renaming the original property Travelodge in 1939 after having built two dozen more simple motel-style properties in five years on behalf of various investors. He incorporated and expanded the entire chain under the TraveLodge banner after 1946.

In 1937, Harlan Sanders opened a motel and restaurant as Sanders Court and Café alongside a fuel station in Corbin, Kentucky; a second location was opened in Asheville, North Carolina, but expansion as a motel chain was not pursued further.

=== Franchise chains ===
Holiday Inn's "Great Sign", used until 1982. Some remain in museums.

In 1951, residential developer Kemmons Wilson returned to Memphis, Tennessee disillusioned by motels encountered on a family road trip to Washington, D.C. In each city, rooms varied from well-kept to filthy, few had a swimming pool, no on-site restaurant meant a few miles driving to buy dinner, and (while the room itself was $8 to $10) motor courts charged $2 extra per child, substantially increasing costs of a family vacation. He would build his own motel at 4941 Summer Avenue (U.S. 70) on the main highway (U.S. 70) from Memphis to Nashville, adopting a name from a 1942 musical film Holiday Inn about a fictional lodge only open on public holidays. Every new Holiday Inn would have TV, air conditioning, a restaurant, and a pool; all would meet a long list of standards in order to have a guest in Memphis to have the same experience as someone in Daytona Beach, Florida or Akron, Ohio. Originally a motel chain, Holiday Inn was first to deploy an IBM-designed national room reservations system in 1965 and opened its 1000th location by 1968.

In 1954 a 60-room motor hotel in Flagstaff, Arizona, opened as the first Ramada (Spanish for "a shaded resting place"). The Twin Bridges Motor Hotel, established in 1957 near Washington, D.C. as a member of Quality Courts, became the first Marriott in 1959, expanding from motel to hotel in 1962.

For individual motel owners, a franchise chain provided an automated central reservation system and a nationally recognized brand which assured consumers that rooms and amenities met a consistent minimum standard. This came at a cost; franchise fees, marketing fees, reservation fees, and royalty fees were not reduced during times of economic recession, leaving most of the business risk with the franchisee while franchise corporations profited. Some franchise contracts restricted the franchisee's ability to sell the business as a going concern or leave the franchise group without penalty.

For the chain, the franchise model allowed a higher level of product standardization and quality control than was possible as a referral chain model while allowing expansion beyond the maximum practical size of a tightly held ownership chain.

In some cases, loosely knit ownership chains (such as Travelodge) and referral chains (such as Quality Courts, founded in 1939 by seven motel operators as a non-profit referral system) were converted to franchise systems.

Quality Courts (1939) and The Best Western Motels (1946) were both originally referral chains and largely marketed together (as Quality Courts were predominantly east of the Mississippi River) until the 1960s. Both built national supply chain and reservation systems while aggressively removing properties not meeting minimum standards. In 1963, their paths diverged. Quality Courts became Quality Inn, abandoning its former co-operative structure to become a for-profit corporation, use shareholder capital to build entirely company-owned locations, and require its members to become franchisees, while Best Western retained its original member-owned status as a marketing co-operative.

=== Freeway era ===
With the introduction of chains, independent motels started to decline. The emergence of freeways bypassing existing highways (such as the Interstate Highway System in the U.S.) caused older motels away from the new roads to lose clientele to motel chains built along the new road's offramps.

Some entire roadside towns were abandoned. Amboy, California (population 700) had grown as a Route 66 rest stop and would decline with the highway as the opening of Interstate 40 in 1973 bypassed the village entirely. The ghost town and its 1938 Roy's Motel and Café were allowed to decay for years and used by film makers in a weathered and deteriorated state.

Even the original 1952 Holiday Inn Hotel Courts in Memphis closed by 1973 and was eventually demolished, as I-40 bypassed U.S. 70 and the chain repositioned itself as a mid-price hotel brand. The Twin Bridges Marriott was demolished for parkland in 1990.

Many independent 1950s-era motels would remain in operation, often sold to new owners or renamed, but continued their steady decline as clients were lost to the chains. Often the building's design, as traditionally little more than a long row of individual bedrooms with outside corridors and no kitchen or dining hall, left it ill-suited to any other purpose.

=== Market segmentation ===
In the 1970s and 1980s, independent motels were losing ground to chains such as Motel 6 and Ramada, existing roadside locations were increasingly bypassed by freeways, and the development of the motel chain led to a blurring of motel and hotel.

While family-owned motels with as few as five rooms could still be found, especially along older highways, these were forced to compete with a proliferation of Economy Limited Service chains. ELS hotels typically do not offer cooked food or mixed drinks; they may offer a very limited selection of continental breakfast foods but have no restaurant, bar, or room service.

Journey's End Corporation (founded 1978 in Belleville, Ontario) built two-story hotel buildings with no on-site amenities to compete directly in price with existing motels. Rooms were comparable to a good hotel but there was no pool, restaurant, health club, or conference center. There was no room service and generic architectural designs varied little between cities. The chain targeted "budget-minded business travelers looking for something between the full-service luxury hotels and the clean-but-plain roadside inns", but largely drew individual travelers from small towns who traditionally supported small roadside motels.

International chains quickly followed this same pattern. Choice Hotels created Comfort Inn as an economy limited service brand in 1982. New limited-service brands from existing franchisors provided market segmentation; by using a different trademark and branding, major hotel chains could build new limited-service properties near airports and freeways without undermining their existing mid-price brands. Creation of new brands also allowed chains to circumvent the contractual minimum distance protections between individual hoteliers in the same chain. Franchisors placed multiple properties under different brands at the same motorway exit, leading to a decline in revenue for individual franchisees. An influx of newly concocted brands became a key factor in a boom in new construction which ultimately led to market saturation.

By the 1990s, Motel 6 and Super 8 were built with inside corridors (so were nominally hotels) while other former motel brands (including Ramada and Holiday Inn) had become mid-price hotel chains. Some individual franchisees built new hotels with modern amenities alongside or in place of their former Holiday Inn motels; by 2010 a mid-range hotel with an indoor pool was the standard required to remain a Holiday Inn.

=== Decline ===
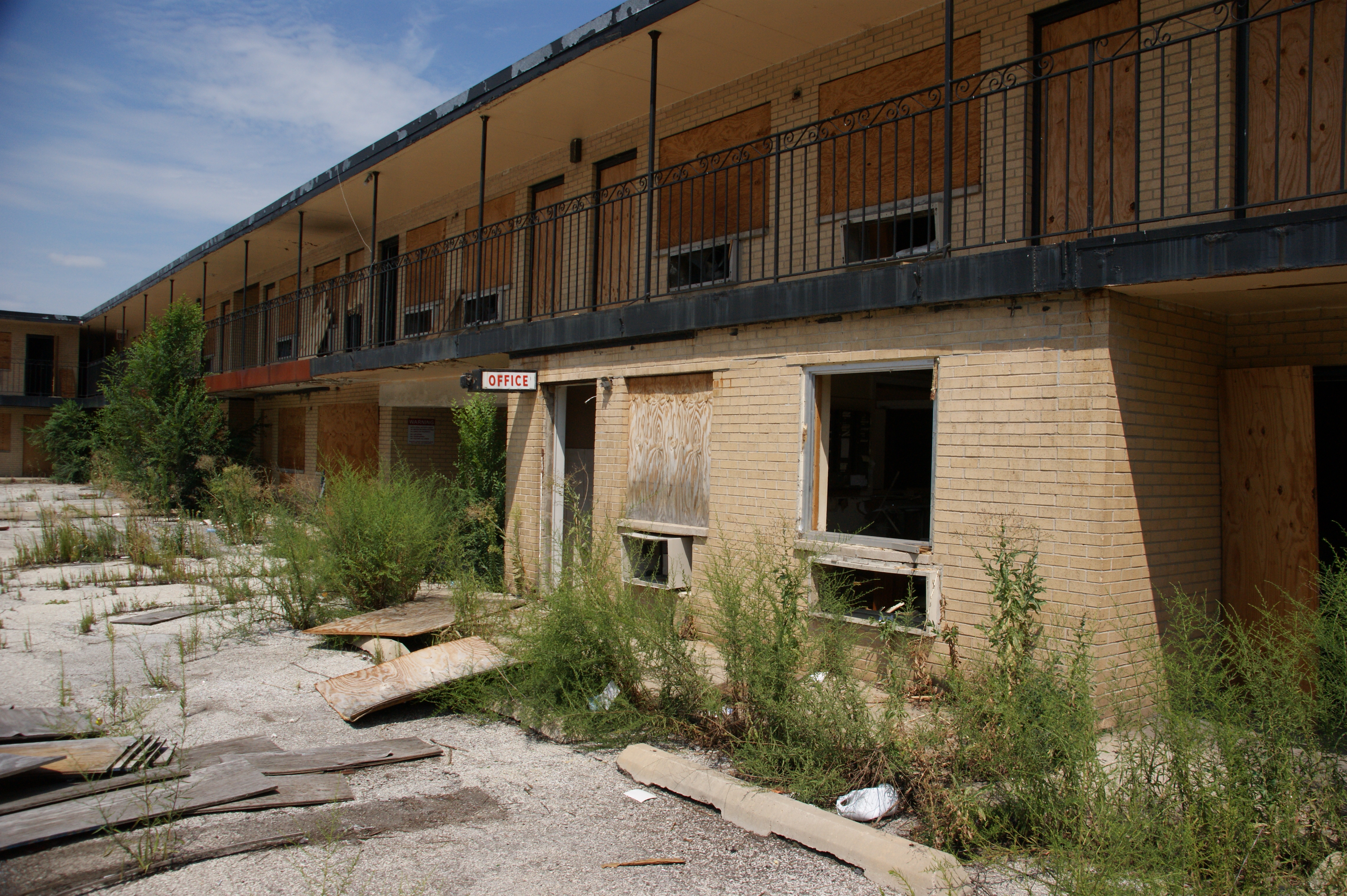
Abandoned Grand West Courts in Chicago, demolished in September 2013

In many once-prime locations, independent motels which thrived in the 1950s and 1960s were being squeezed out by the 1980s as they were forced to compete with growing chains with a much larger number of rooms at each property. Many were left stranded on former two-lane main highways which had been bypassed by motorways or declined as original owners retired and subsequent proprietors neglected the maintenance of buildings and rooms. As these were low-end properties even in their heyday, most are now showing their age.

In Canada, the pattern was most visible in the densely populated Windsor-Quebec Corridor, particularly the urban locations like Toronto's Kingston Road motel strip once bypassed by the completed Highway 401, and the section of Highway 7 between Modeland Road and Airport Road known as the "Golden Mile" for its plethora of motels and restaurants (as well as points of interest such as the Sarnia Airport and Hiawatha Racetrack and Waterpark) which was bypassed by Highway 402. The decline of motels was also found at awkward rural locations formerly on the main road. Many remote stretches of the Trans-Canada Highway remain unbypassed by motorway and some independent motels survive.

In the U.S., the Interstate Highway System was bypassing U.S. Highways nationwide. The best-known example was the complete removal of Route 66 from the U.S. highway system in 1985 after it was bypassed (mostly by Interstate 40). U.S. 66 was particularly problematic as the old route number was often moved to the new road as soon as the bypasses were constructed, while Highway Beautification Act restrictions left existing properties with no means to obtain signage on the newly constructed Interstate. Some motels were demolished, converted to private residences, or used as storage space while others have been left to slowly fall apart.

In many towns, maintenance and renovation of existing properties would stop as soon as word was out that an existing highway was the target of a proposed bypass; this decline would only accelerate after the new road opened. Attempts by owners to compete for the few remaining clients on a bypassed road by lowering prices typically only worsened the decline by leaving no funds to invest in improving or properly maintaining the property; accepting clients who would have been formerly turned away also led to crime problems in cities.

By 1976 the term "cockroach motel" was well-established; a slogan for Black Flag's trademark "Roach Motel" bug traps would be paraphrased as "they check in, but they don't check out" to refer to these declining properties. (Note: Nancy White's 1993 "Senator Lawson at the Motel Cucaracha" (03:45) adopts this modified tag line as part of the song's chorus)

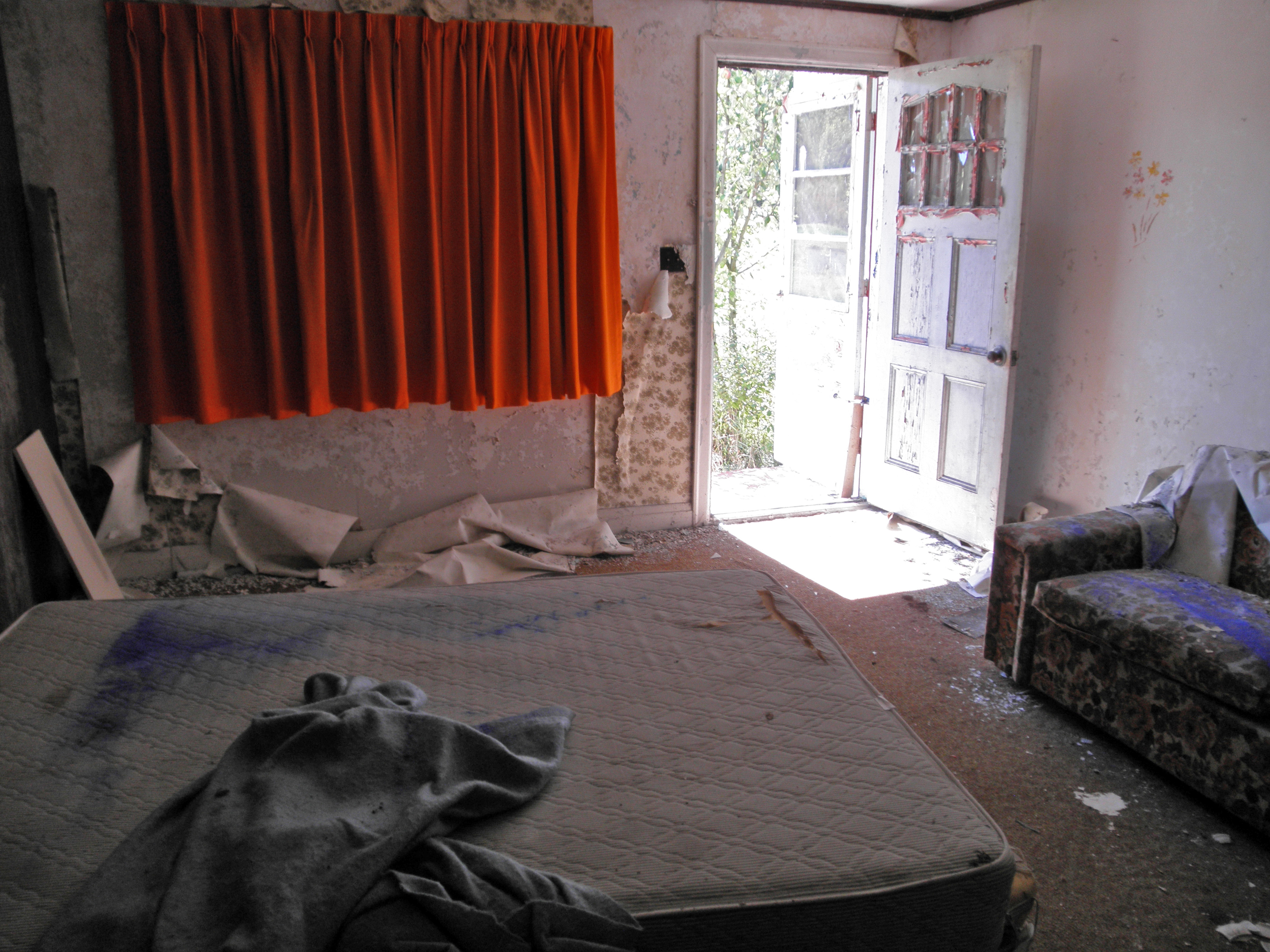
An abandoned room

In declining urban areas (like Kingston Road in Toronto, or some of the districts along Van Buren Street in Phoenix, largely bypassed as a through route to California by Interstate 10), the remaining low-end motels from the two-lane highway era are often seen as seedy places for the homeless, prostitution, and drugs as vacant rooms in now-bypassed areas are often rented (and in some cases acquired outright) by social-service agencies to house refugees, abuse victims, and families awaiting social housing. Conversely, some areas which were merely roadside suburbs in the 1950s are now valuable urban land on which original structures are being removed through gentrification and the land used for other purposes. Toronto's Lake Shore Boulevard strip in Etobicoke was bulldozed to make way for condominiums.

In some cases, historic properties have been allowed to slowly decay. The Motel Inn of San Luis Obispo, which (as Milestone Motor Hotel) was the first to use the "motel" name, sits incomplete with what is still standing left boarded up and fenced off at the side of U.S. Route 101; a 2002 restoration proposal never came to fruition.

Alamo Plaza Hotel Courts, the first motel chain, was sold off in pieces as the original owners retired. Most of its former locations on the U.S. highway system have declined beyond repair or were demolished. One 1941 property on U.S. Route 190 in Baton Rouge remains open with its Alamo Plaza Restaurant now gone, its pool filled in, its original color scheme painted over, its front desk behind bulletproof glass, and its rooms infested with roaches and other vermin. A magnet for criminal activity, police are summoned daily. Other Alamo sites in Chattanooga, Memphis, and Dallas have simply been demolished.

The American Hotel and Motel Association removed 'motel' from its name in 2000, becoming the American Hotel and Lodging Association. The association felt that the term 'lodging' more accurately reflects the large variety of different style hotels, including luxury and boutique hotels, suites, inns, budget, and extended stay hotels.

=== Modernization ===
In the late 20th century, a majority of motels in the United States came under the ownership of people of Indian descent, particularly Gujaratis as the original "mom and pop" owners retired from the motel industry and sold their properties. However, some families still kept their motels, and to this day, one can find a motel owned by the same family who built and ran it originally (e.g. the Maples Motel in Sandusky, Ohio) with a subsequent generation continuing the family business.

Many low-end independent motels have had to adapt in order to remain competitive with Economy Limited Service franchise chains that continue to gain market share. For instance, motels that once touted color television as a luxury now come standard with numerous amenities comparable to economy limited service hotels, including flatscreen television, pay-per-view or in-room movies, microwave ovens, minibar fridges, and wireless Internet. Similar to modern hotels, motel rooms are now required to be reserved online using credit cards so guests cannot remain anonymous, and secured against intruders with keycards which expire as soon as a client checks out. (Note: Traditionally, motels used a "metal key on a preprinted plastic tag". June 6, 2008. with the motel's address, room number, and "return postage guaranteed — drop in any mailbox". Anyone finding a lost or stolen key had full access to the room, a security issue.) Long-time independent motels which join existing low-end chains to remain viable are known as "conversion" franchises; these do not use the standardized architecture which originally defined many franchise brands.

While many former motel chains left the low-end of the market to franchise mid-range hotels, a handful of national franchise brands (Econo Lodge, Travelodge, Knights Inn and Magnuson Hotels lowest tier M-Star) remain available to owners of existing motels with the original drive-up-to-room motor court architecture.

Due to the negative stigma associated with "motel", many surviving motel establishments which retain their original layout have since rebranded to "hotel", "inn", or "lodge".

=== Revitalization and preservation ===
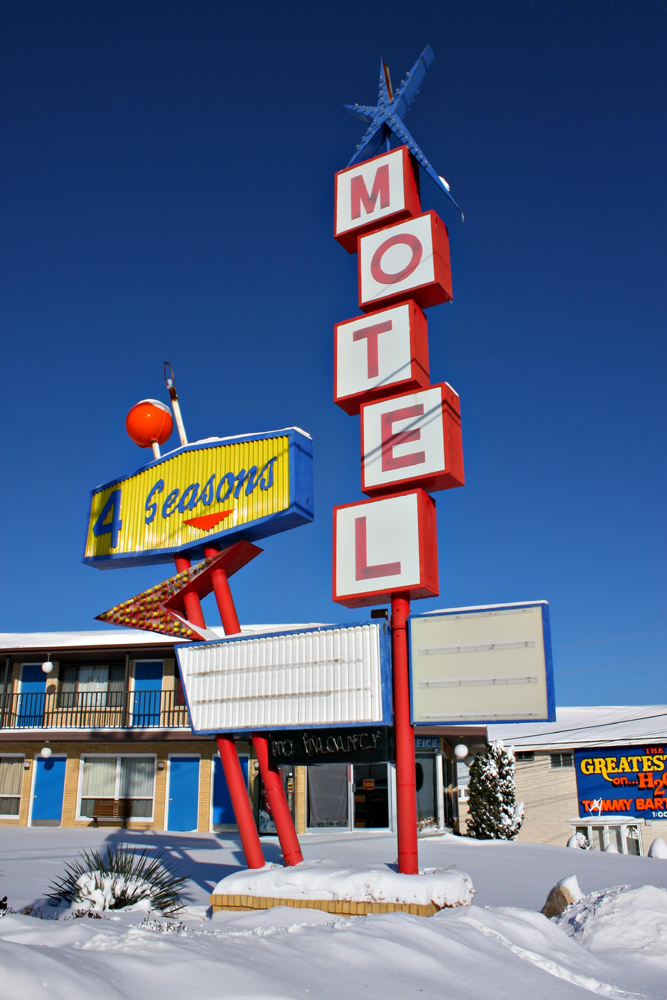
The 4 Seasons Motel sign in Wisconsin Dells, Wisconsin is an excellent example of googie architecture.

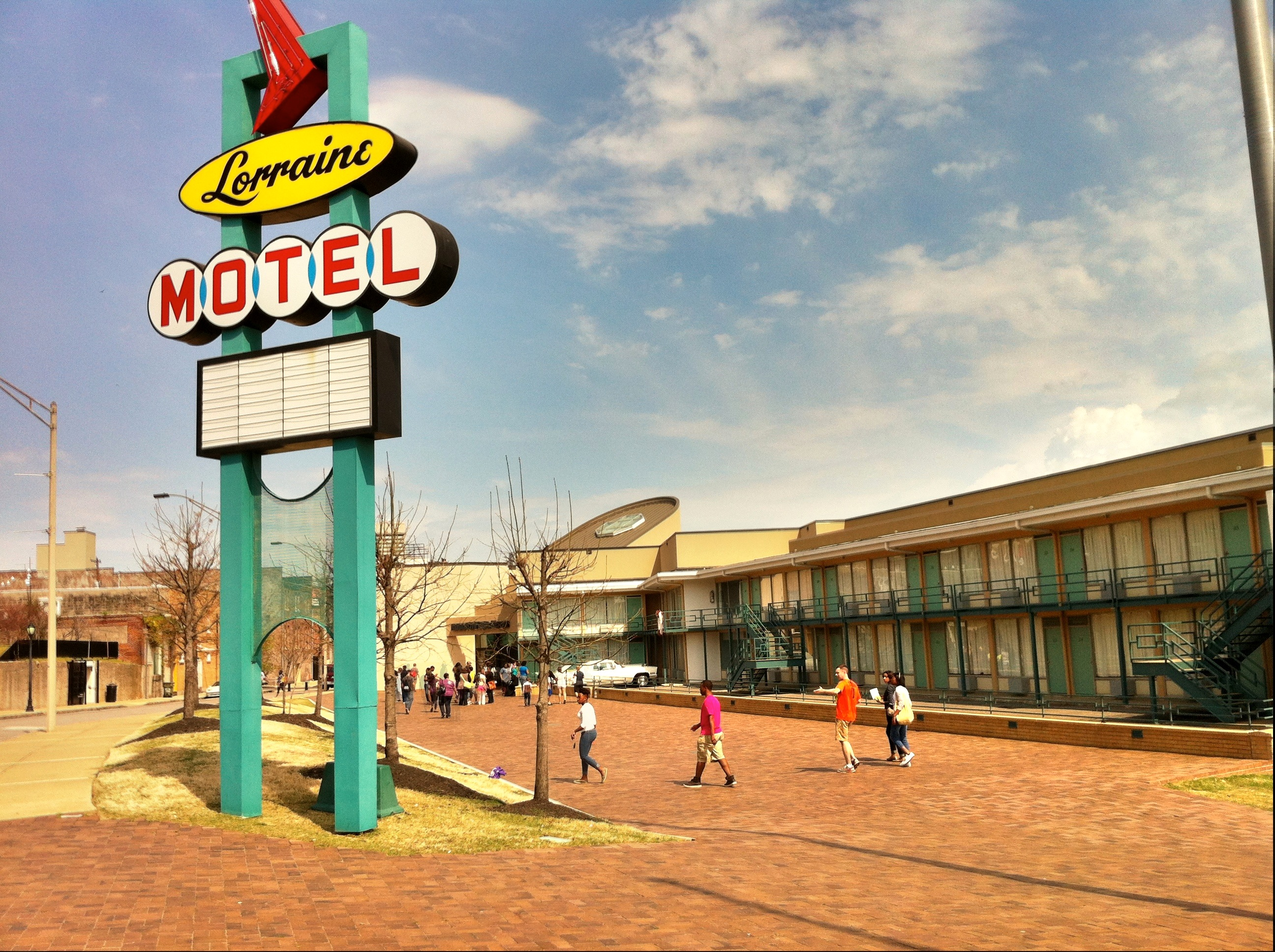
The Lorraine Motel, site of the 1968 assassination of Martin Luther King Jr., is part of the National Civil Rights Museum.

In the early to mid 2000s, much original 1950s roadside infrastructure on now-bypassed U.S. highways had fallen into decline or was being razed for development. The National Trust for Historic Preservation named the Wildwoods Shore motel district in New Jersey in its 2006 list of America's Most Endangered Historic Places and included the Historic Route 66 Motels from Illinois to California on its 2007 list.

Preservationists have sought to list endangered properties on various federal or state historic registries, although in many cases a historic listing gives a building little or no protection from alteration or demolition.

The Oakleigh Motel in Oakleigh, Victoria, Australia, constructed using Googie architecture during the 1956 Summer Olympics as one of the first motels in the state, was added to the Victorian Heritage Register in 2009. The building was gutted by developers in 2010 for a row house development; only the outer shell remains original.

The Aztec Motel in Albuquerque, New Mexico (built in 1932) was listed on the National Register of Historic Places in 1993 and listed on the New Mexico State Register of Cultural Properties as the oldest continuously operating U.S. Route 66 motel in New Mexico. It was demolished in 2011. While listing the Coral Court Motel near St. Louis, Missouri, on the National Register of Historic Places failed to prevent a 1995 demolition, one of the cabins survives as part of an exhibit at the National Museum of Transportation after being painstakingly dismantled by volunteers for relocation.

==== U.S. Route 66 ====
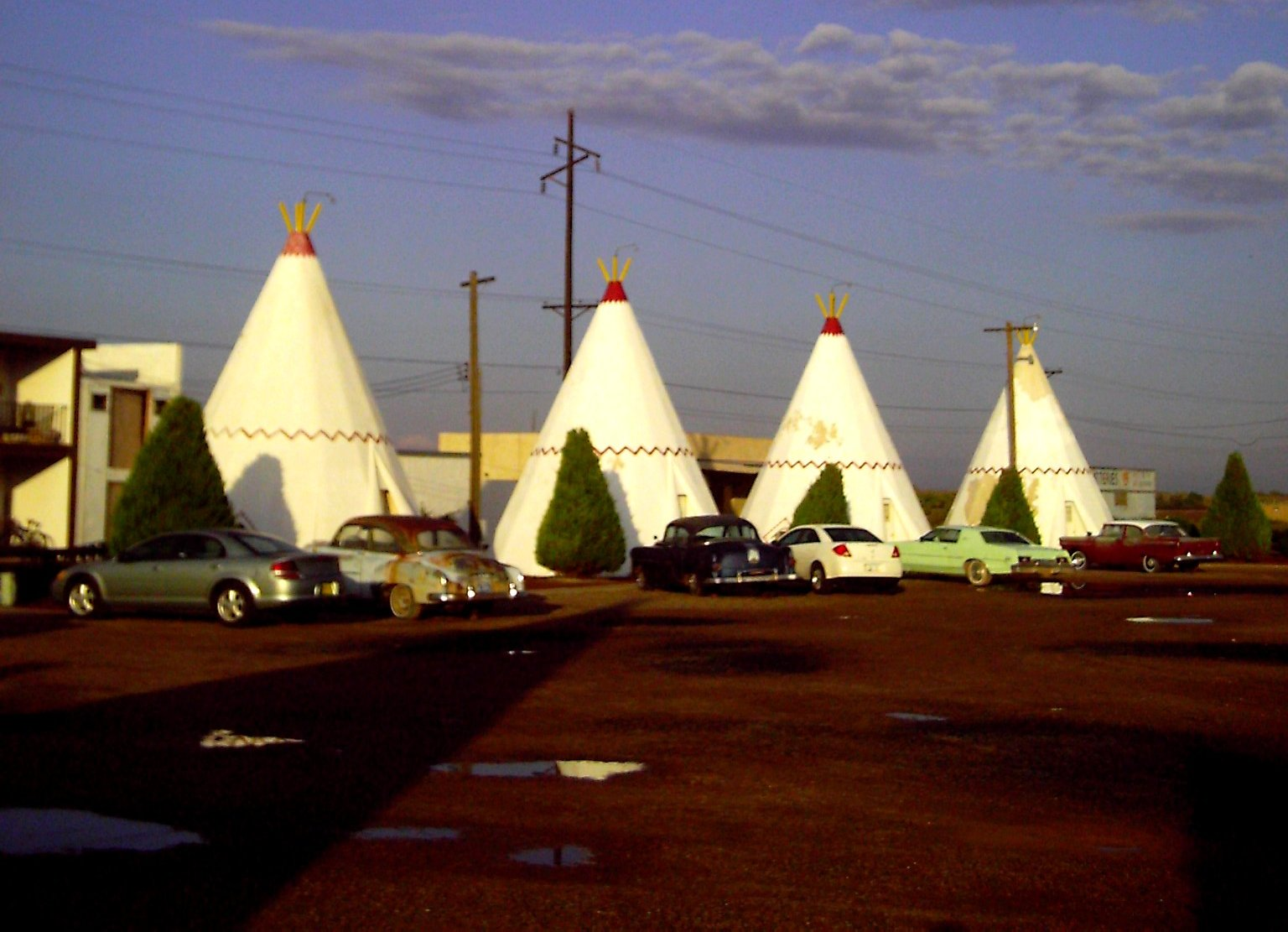
Wigwam Motel No. 6, a unique motel/motor court on historic Route 66 in Holbrook, Arizona

The plight of Route 66, whose removal from the United States Highway System in 1985 turned places like Glenrio, Texas and Amboy, California into overnight ghost towns, has captured public attention. Route 66 associations, built on the model of Angel Delgadillo's first 1987 association in Seligman, Arizona, have advocated preservation and restoration of the motels, businesses, and roadside infrastructure of the neon era. In 1999, the National Route 66 Preservation Bill allocated $10 million in matching fund grants for private restoration and preservation of historic properties along the route. The road popularized through John Steinbeck's The Grapes of Wrath and Bobby Troup's "(Get Your Kicks On) Route 66" was marketed not as transportation infrastructure but as a tourism destination in its own right.

To many small towns bypassed by Interstate highways, embracing 1950s nostalgia and historic restoration brings in badly needed tourism dollars to restore sagging local economies. Many vintage motels, some dating to the cabin court era of the 1930s, have been renovated, restored, and added to the U.S. National Register of Historic Places or to local and state listings. While a handful were repurposed as either low-income housing, boutique hotels, apartments, or commercial/office space, many were simply restored as motels.

While some modern amenities (such as wi-fi or flatscreen TV) may appear in the newly restored rooms, exterior architecture and neon highway signage is meticulously restored to original designs. By 2012, Route 66 travelers were spending $38 million/year visiting historic places and museums in communities on the former highway, with $94 million annually invested in heritage preservation; The Motels of Route 66 was announced as an upcoming documentary film.

== International variations ==
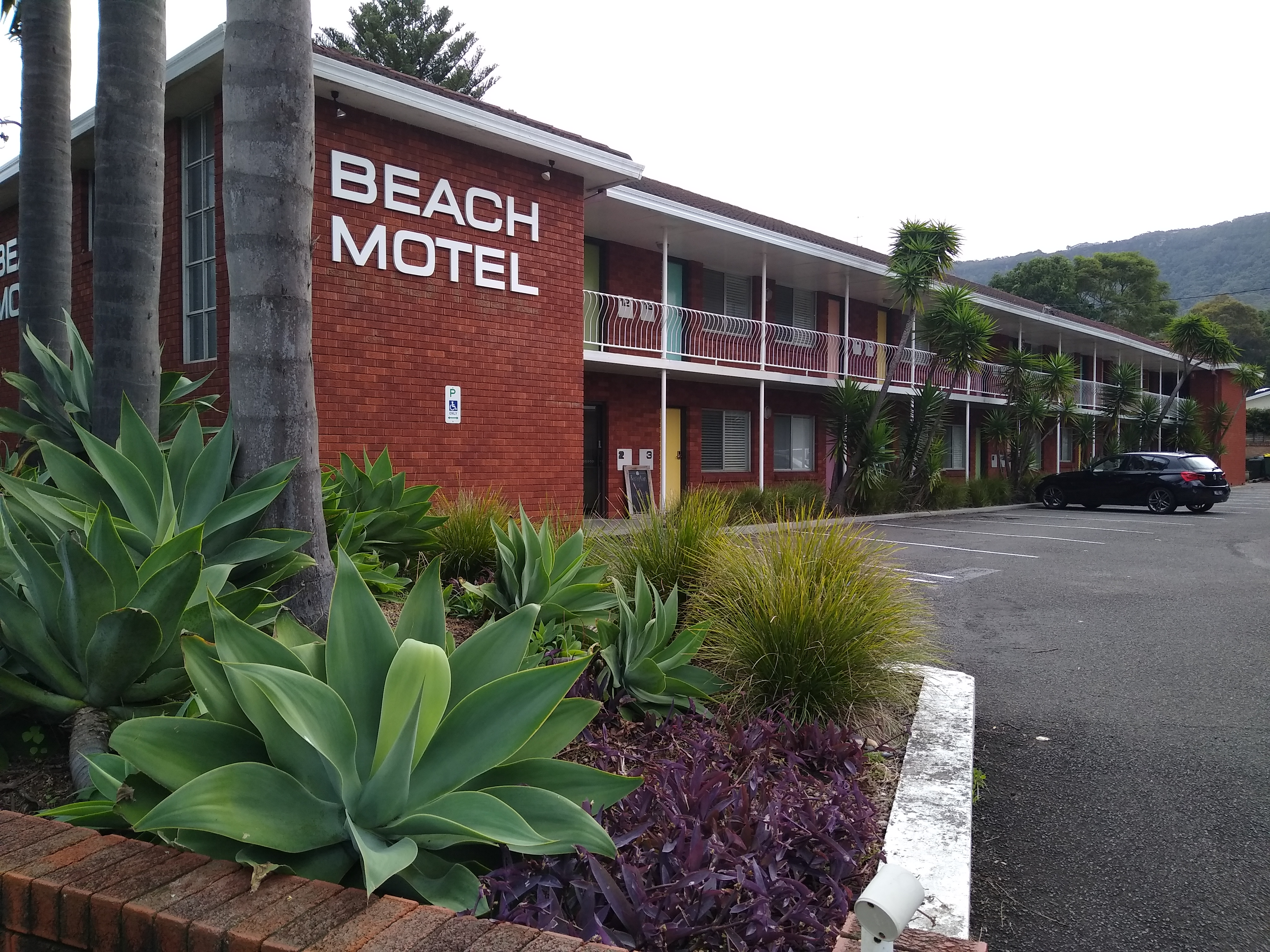
A motel in Thirroul, New South Wales, Australia

The early motels were built in the southwestern United States as a replacement for the tourist camps and tourist cabins which had grown around the U.S. highway system. In Australia and New Zealand, motels have followed largely the same path of development as in Canada and the United States. The first Australian motels include the West End Motel in Ballina, New South Wales (1937) and the Penzance Motel in Eagle Hawk, Tasmania (1939).

Motels gained international popularity in countries such as Thailand, Germany, and Japan but in some countries the term "motel" now connotes either a low-end hotel (such as Hotel Formule 1 in Europe) or a no-tell motel.

=== Canada ===
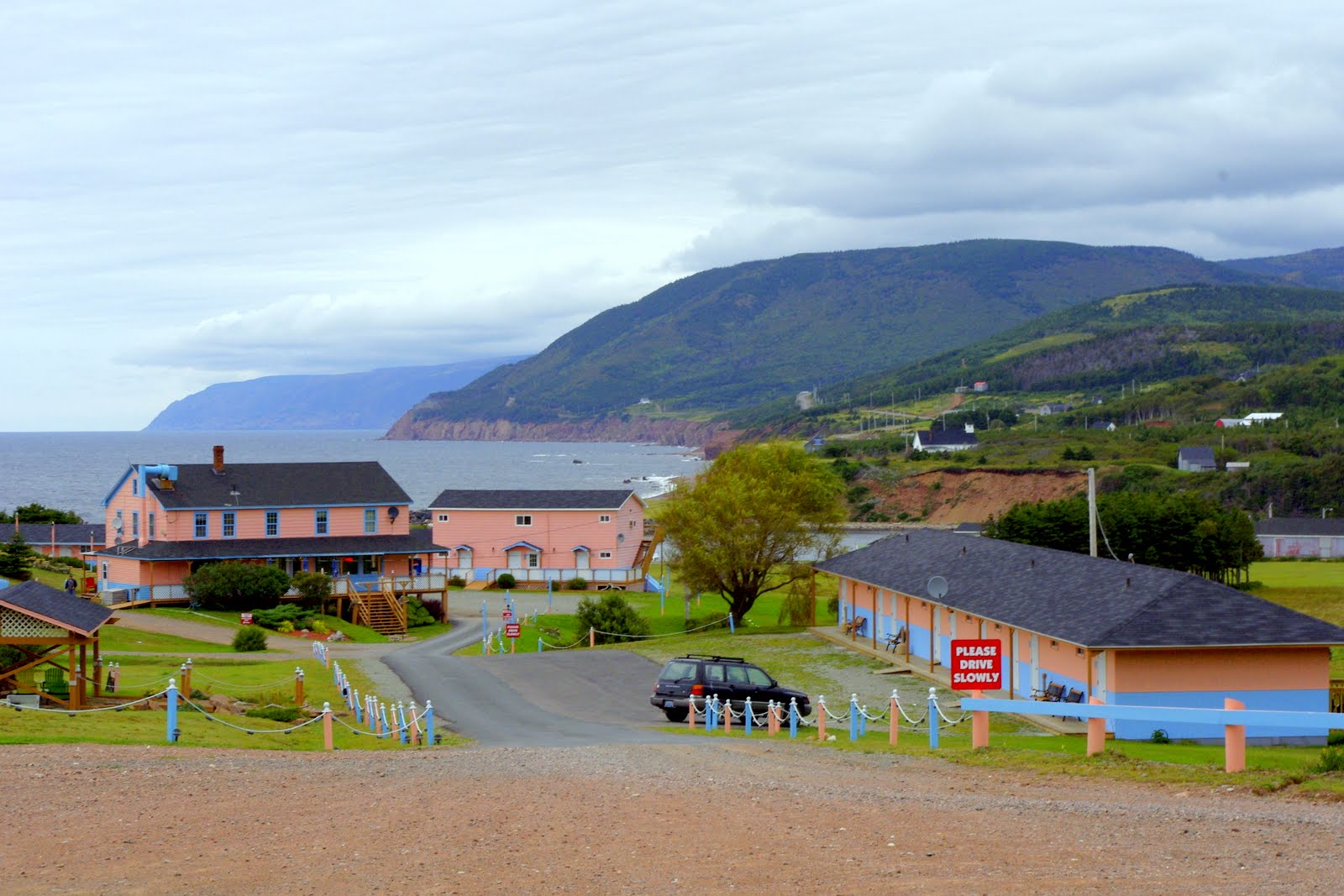
The Mid-Trail Motel & Inn in Pleasant Bay, Nova Scotia, Canada, 2010

As in the U.S., the initial 1930s roadside accommodations were primitive tourist camps, with over a hundred campgrounds listed in Ontario alone on one 1930 provincial road map. While most of these provided access to the most basic of amenities (like picnic tables, playgrounds, toilet facilities and supplies), fewer than a quarter offered cottages in the pre-Depression era, and the vast majority required travelers bring their own tents. In Canada's climate, these sites were effectively unusable outside the high season.

Because cabins and camps were ill-suited to a Canadian winter, the number and variety of motels grew dramatically after World War II, peaking just before freeways such as Ontario Highway 401 opened in the 1960s. Due to Canada's climate and short tourist season, which begins at Victoria Day and continued until Labour Day or Thanksgiving, any outdoor swimming pool would be usable for little more than two months of the year and independent motels would operate at a loss or close during the off-season.

By the 1980s, motels were losing ground rapidly to franchises such as Journey's End Corporation and the U.S.-based chains. The section of Highway 7 between Modeland Road and Airport Road, known as the "Golden Mile" for its plethora of motels and restaurants was bypassed once Highway 402 was completed in 1982, however the Golden Mile still retains points of interest such as the Sarnia Airport and Hiawatha Racetrack and Waterpark.

Much of Canada's population is crowded into a few small southern regions. While the Windsor-Québec corridor was bypassed by motorways relatively early, in more sparsely populated regions (including much of Northern Ontario) thousands of kilometers of mostly two-lane Trans-Canada Highway remain undisturbed as the road makes its lengthy journey westward through tiny, distant and isolated communities.

=== Europe ===
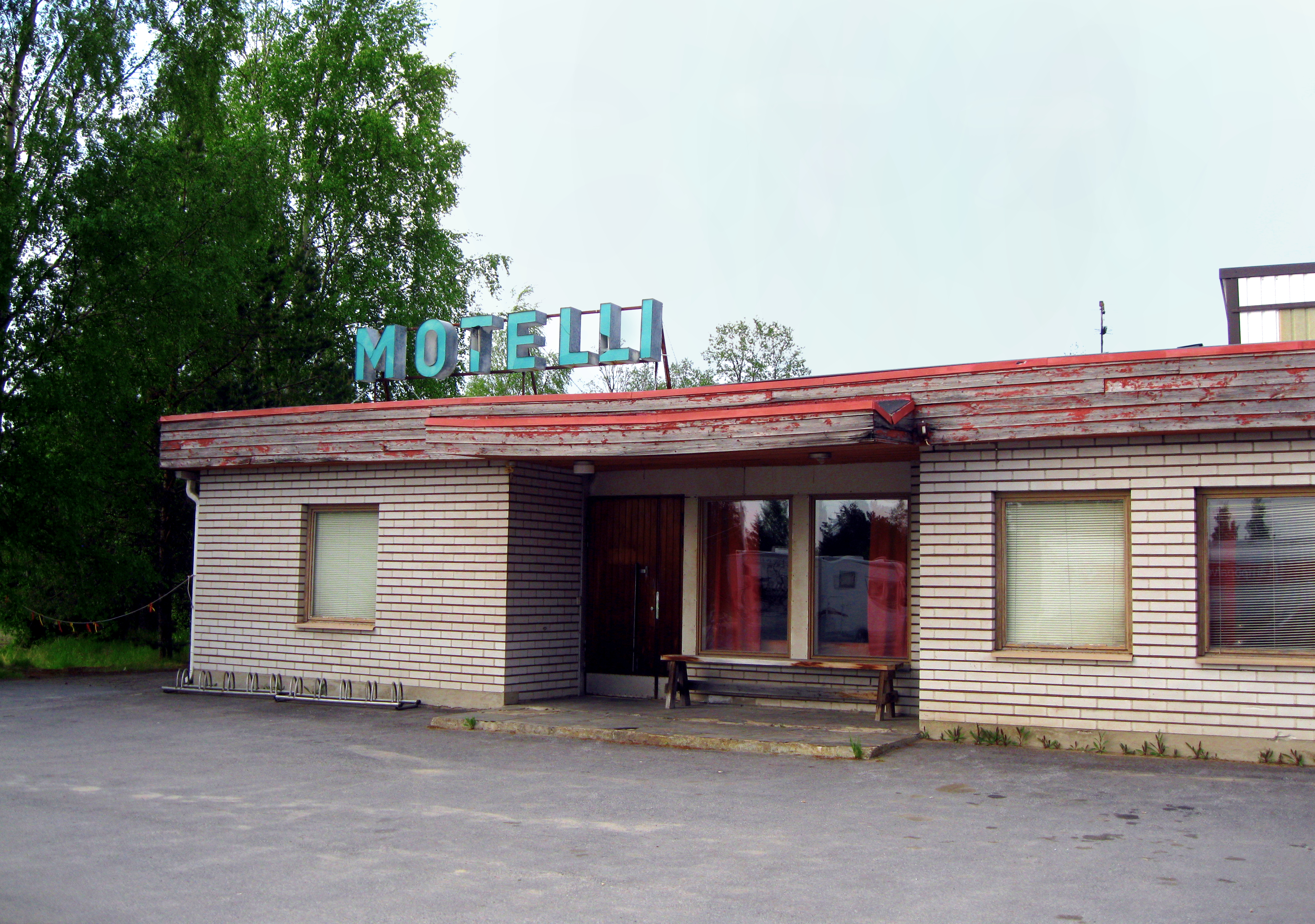
Motel Kotipesä in Vimpeli, Finland

The original concept of a motel as a motorist's hotel which grew up around the highways of the 1920s is of American origin. The term appears to have initially had the same meaning in other countries but has since been used in many places to refer either to a budget-priced hotel with limited amenities or a love hotel, depending on the country and language. The division between motel and hotel, like elsewhere, has been blurred, so many of these are low-end hotels.

In France, motel-style chain accommodations of up to three stories (with exterior hallways and stairwells) usually reach the "one-star" rank in France's national tourism agency classification of tourist hotels. The Louvre Hôtels chain operates Première Classe (1 star) as a market segmentation brand in this range, using other marques for higher or mid-range hotels. The use of "motel" to identify any budget-priced roadhouse hotel (Rasthaus, Raststätte) also exists in the German language; some French chains operating in Germany (such as Accor's Hotel Formule 1) offer automated registration and small, Spartan rooms at reduced cost.

In Portuguese, "motel" (plural: "motéis") commonly refers not to the original drive-up accommodation house for motorists but to an "adult motel" or love hotel with amenities such as whirlpool baths, in-room pornography, candles and oversize or non-standard-shaped beds in various honeymoon-suite styles. These rooms are available for as little as four hours, and minors are excluded from these establishments. (Note: "Motéis de Portugal" ("Motels of Portugal", www.moteisdeportugal.com) is a listing of what elsewhere would be classed as adult motels; see also "Motel" (in Portuguese) in that language's Wikipedia.) (The Portuguese-language term "rotel" had brief usage in 1970s Rio de Janeiro, Brazil for a similar concept, ro- for rooms through which clients rotate in a matter of hours instead of overnight.)

A similar association of "motel" to short-stay hotels with reserved parking and luxury rooms which can be rented by couples for a few hours has begun to appear in Italy, where the market segment has shown significant growth since the 1990s and become highly competitive.

=== Latin America ===
In Latin America, a "motel" (in Mexico, "Motel de paso") is an establishment often associated with extramarital encounters and rented typically for a few hours (15 minutes to 12 hours). In Ecuador, any establishment with the title "Motel" is related to extramarital encounters; in Argentina and Peru these hotels for couples are called "telo" (from "hotel") and offered for anything from a few hours to overnight, with décor based on amenities such as dim lights, a whirlpool and a king-size bed.

In the Dominican Republic, "cabins" (named for their cabin-like shape) have all these amenities (such as a whirlpool bath, oversize bed and HDTV) but generally do not have windows, and have private parking for each room individually. Registration is handled not in a conventional manner but, upon entering the room, by delivering a bill with the registration through a small window that does not allow eye contact to ensure greater discretion.

The connotations of "motel" as adult motel or love hotel in both the Spanish and Portuguese languages can be awkward for U.S.-based chains accustomed to using the term in its original meaning, although this issue is diminishing as chains (such as Super 8 Motels) increasingly drop the word "motel" from their corporate identities at home.

== Crime and illicit activity ==
Many auto camps were used as havens and hide-outs for criminals of the 1920s; Bonnie and Clyde had a shootout in the infamous Red Crown Tourist Court near Kansas City on July 20, 1933. Courtney Ryley Cooper's 1940 American Magazine article "Camps of Crime" attributed to J. Edgar Hoover a denunciation of tourist courts as bases of operation for gangs of desperadoes, claiming that "a large number of roadside cottage groups appear to be not tourist camps but assignation camps" and alleging that "marijuana sellers have been found around such places."

There is today a new home of crime in America, a new home of disease, bribery, corruption, crookedness, rape, white slavery, thievery and murder. There are few major cases in the FBI involving an extended pursuit in which the roadside crime-nest is not responsible for some form of easy lawlessness, for providing convenient hide-outs, for concealing criminals through loose registration regulations... a majority of the 35,000 tourist camps in the U.S. threaten the peace and welfare of the communities upon which these camps have fastened themselves and all of us who form the motoring public. Many of them are not only hide-outs and meeting places, but actual bases of operations from which gangs of desperadoes prey upon the surrounding territory... The files of the FBI are loaded with instances of gangsters who have hidden out in unregulated tourist camps, while officers combed the country for them. There is no regular checking of the registers by detectives — often there are no registers at all, or merely ledgers filled with indiscriminate scrawls and an endless repetition of 'John Smith and wife'... Hence the terse order that goes out daily to law-enforcement agencies when criminals are on the loose: 'KEEP CLOSE WATCH ON TOURIST CAMPS!'

Ultimately, efforts to curb the unconstrained growth of tourist courts were futile as motor courts (as motels were called in the 1930s and 1940s) grew in number and popularity.

Motels have served as a haven for fugitives in the past as the anonymity and a simple registration process helped fugitives to remain ahead of the law. Several changes have reduced the capacity of motels to serve this purpose. In many jurisdictions, regulations now require motel operators to obtain ID from clients and meet specific record-keeping requirements. Credit card transactions, which in the past were more easily approved and took days to report, are now approved or declined on the spot and are instantly recorded in a database, thereby allowing law enforcement access to this information.

Motels which allow a room to be rented inexpensively for less than one full night's stay or which allow a couple not wishing to be seen together publicly to enter a room without passing through the office or lobby area have been nicknamed "no-tell motels" due to their long association with adultery. Even where rooms were rented overnight to middle-class travelers (and not locals or extended-stay clients) there have been ongoing problems with theft of motel property by travelers; everything from waterbeds to television sets to bedspreads and pillows have routinely gone missing in what one 1970s Associated Press report labelled "highway robbery".

The least costly motels sometimes serve as temporary housing for people who are not able to afford an apartment or have recently lost their home. Motels catering to long-term stays occasionally have kitchenettes or efficiencies, or a motel room with a kitchen. While conventional apartments are more cost-effective with better amenities, tenants unable to pay first and last month's rent or undesirable due to unemployment, criminal records or credit problems do seek low-end residential motels because of a lack of viable short-term options.

Motels in low-income areas are often plagued with drug activity, street prostitution or other crime. Some correctional officials temporarily place newly paroled convicts into motels if upon release they have nowhere to stay. These motels have daily to monthly rates.

According to the Center for Problem-Oriented Policing,

In the 1930s and 1940s, individually owned and operated motels offered travelers an eclectic, economical array of relatively safe lodging options. In the 1950s, corporations such as Holiday Inn and Howard Johnson's sought to capitalize on the growing national travel market by offering consumers brand-name, standardized lodging. The interstate highways built in the 1950s and 1960s favored the chains by essentially re-routing motorists away from the older, independent establishments, many of which were located along ageing roads that ran parallel to—but were difficult to access from—the new interstates. In some cases, major motel chains built their properties right at the interstate exits; motorists seeking independent motels had to bypass the chains and venture farther from the interstate to find them. The smaller, non-chain motels had difficulty competing with the large national chains under these circumstances. To survive economically, they began catering to the lower end of the market; some turned into adult motels, while others served as housing for low-income people. Unable to afford upkeep, many of the formerly quaint motels deteriorated and became havens for crime and disorder.

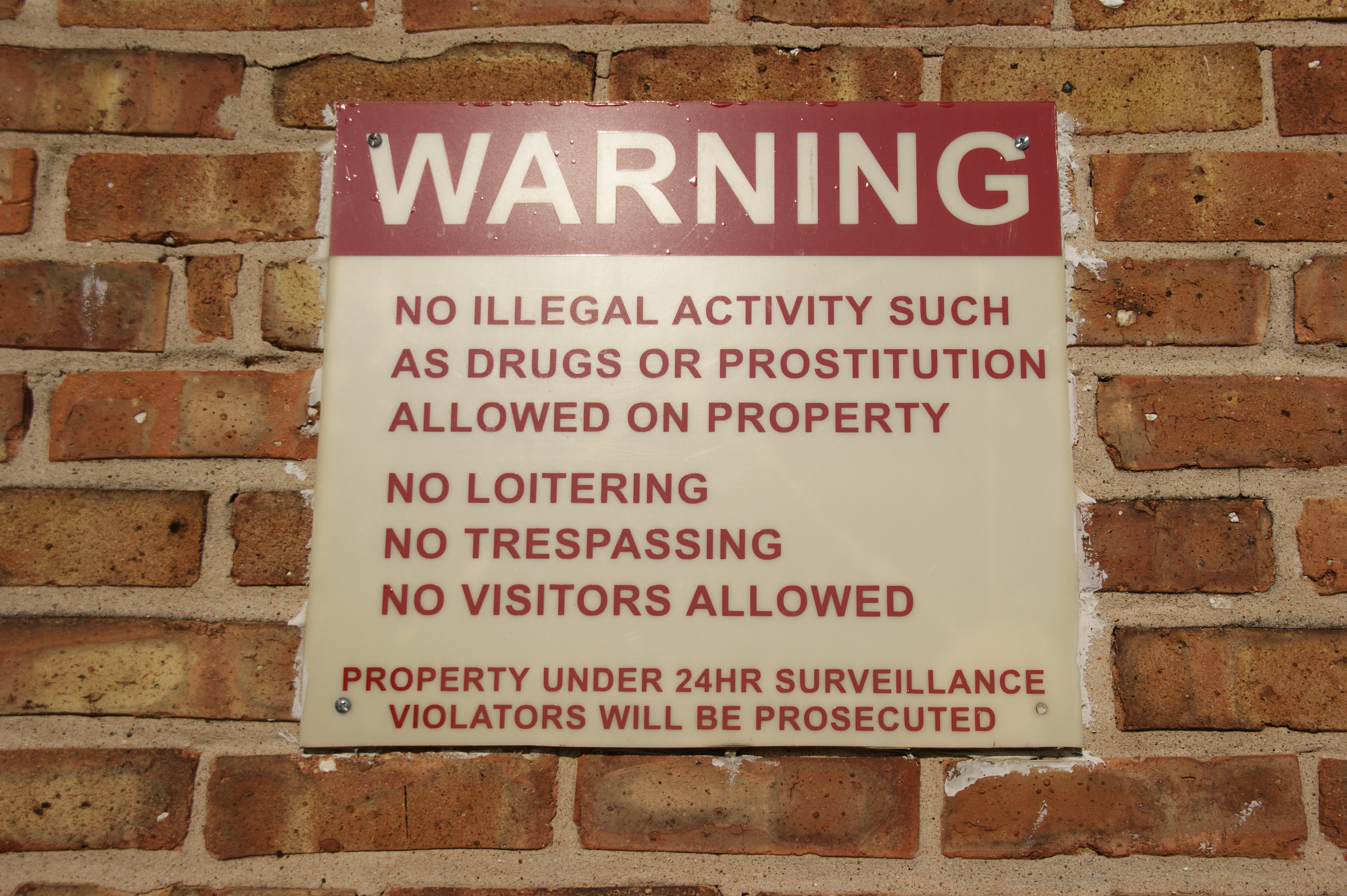
Sign on Chicago motel

The annual number of calls for service to police departments per room ("CFS/room") as a metric has been used to identify motels with poor surveillance of visitors, inadequate staff or management unwilling to pro-actively exclude known or likely problem tenants. Motels with poor security in bad neighborhoods attract disturbances (including guests who will not leave or pay), robbery, auto theft and theft from rooms or vehicles, vandalism, public intoxication and alcoholism, drug dealing or clandestine methamphetamine laboratories, fighting, street gang activity, pimping and street prostitution or sexual assaults.

Originally built to accommodate the adventurous traveler of the 1930s and 1940s, motels were marketed as driver-friendly—motorists could drive right up to their rooms. Ironically, what was originally a selling point is now one of the most detrimental aspects of motels, from a crime prevention standpoint. Direct access to rooms allows problem guests and visitors to come and go without being seen by motel personnel. Regardless of size, motels with unimpeded pedestrian and vehicle access to rooms can be difficult to manage, and may have a relatively high number of service calls if they serve a risky clientele.

As severe unlawful conduct issues impact the neighborhood as a whole, some municipalities have adopted a nuisance abatement strategy of using public health and fire safety violations or taxation laws as pretexts to shut down bad motels. City bylaws such as Seattle's "Chronic Nuisance Properties" ordinance have also been used to penalize owners or shut down a business entirely.

== In popular culture ==
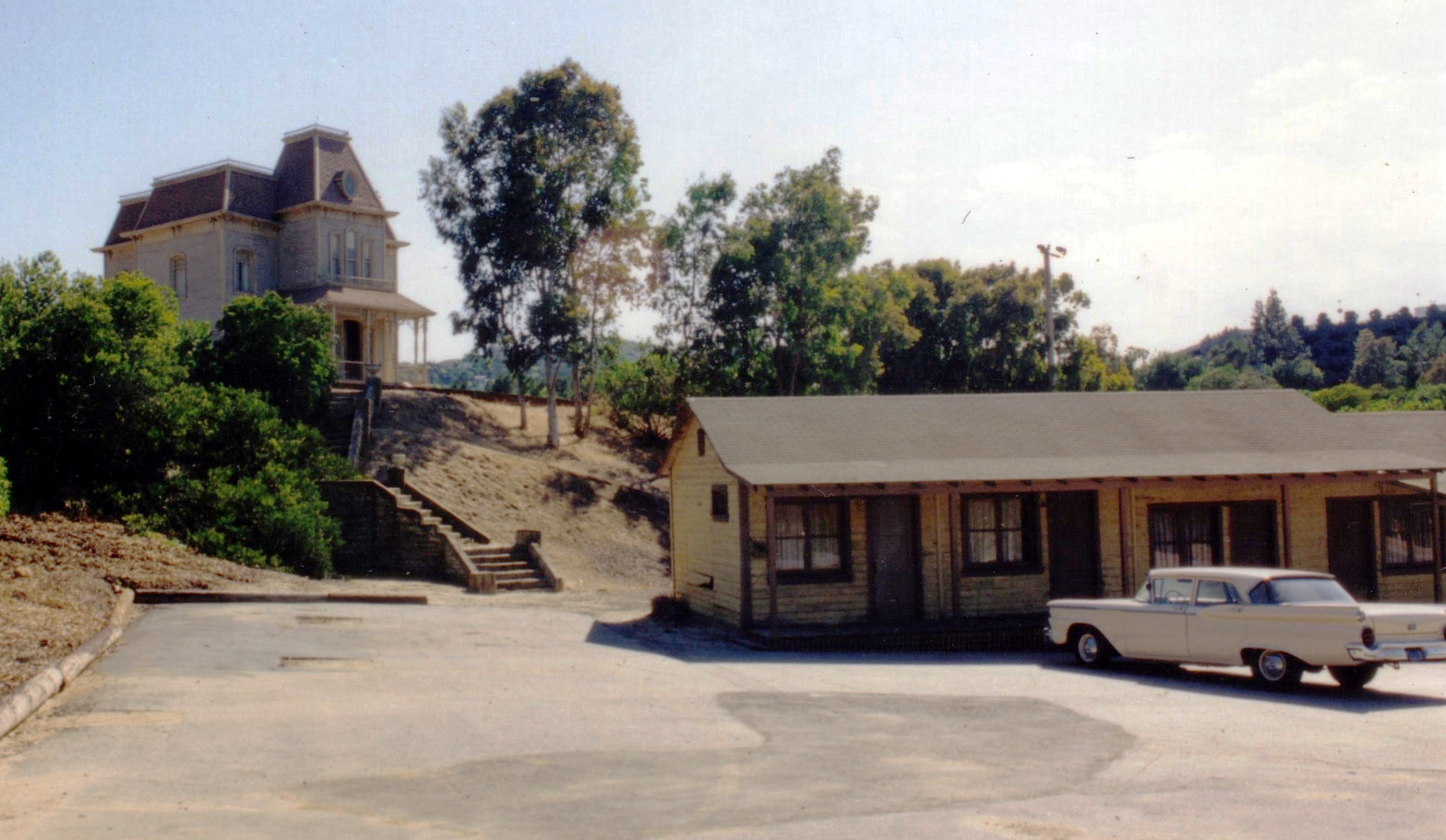
The Bates Motel set at Universal Studios

The Bates Motel is an important part of Psycho, a 1959 novel by Robert Bloch, and Alfred Hitchcock's 1960 film adaptation. Psycho II, Psycho III and Psycho IV: The Beginning, sequels to the film, also feature the motel, as does Gus Van Sant's 1998 remake of the original film. A comedic 1987 television movie Bates Motel and the 2013 television series Bates Motel, a prequel to the films, both use the name of the motel as a title. In the 2010 Halloween TV special Scared Shrekless, Puss in Boots tells a cautionary tale about the "Boots Motel".

The scenario of an isolated motel being operated by a serial killer, whose guests subsequently become victims, has been exploited in a number of other horror films, notably Motel Hell (1980) and Mountaintop Motel Massacre (1986). More recently, the genre has been revived with such films as Mayhem Motel (2001), Murder Inn (2005), Vacancy (2007), and its direct-to-video prequel, Vacancy 2: The First Cut (2009).

Several of these horror films also incorporate the sub-theme of voyeurism, whereby the motel owner spies on (or even films) the sexual exploits of the guests. This plays on the long-established connotations of motels and illicit sexual activity, which has itself formed the basis for numerous other films, variously representing the thriller, comedy, teen film, and sexploitation genres. Stephen C. Apostolof's Motel Confidential (1967) and the porn film Motel for Lovers (1970) were two notable early examples. More recent manifestations include Paradise Motel (1985), Talking Walls (1987), Desire and Hell at Sunset Motel (1991), and the Korean films Motel Cactus (1997) and The Motel (2005).

In countless other films and TV series, the motel—invariably depicted as an isolated, run-down, and seedy establishment—has served as the setting for sordid events often involving equally sordid characters. Examples include Pink Motel (1982), Motel Blue 19 (1993), Backroad Motel (2001), Stateline Motel (2003), Niagara Motel (2006), and Motel 5150 (2008).

In the film Sparkle Lite Motel (2006) and the TV miniseries The Lost Room (2006), the motel made forays into the realms of science fiction. In the Pixar animation Cars (2006), a clientele of solely anthropomorphic vehicles requires all hotels be motels where clients drive directly to their rooms; allusions to real Route 66 motels on the U.S. National Register of Historic Places abound in the film. The Cozy Cone Motel design is the Wigwam Motel on U.S. Route 66 in Arizona with the neon "100% Refrigerated Air" slogan of Tucumcari, New Mexico's Blue Swallow Motel; the Wheel Well Motel's name alludes to the restored stone-cabin Wagon Wheel Motel in Cuba, Missouri. A long-defunct "Glenn Rio Motel" recalls Route 66 ghost town Glenrio, New Mexico and Texas, now a national historic district on the state line. Glenrio once boasted the "First Motel in Texas" (as seen when arriving from New Mexico) or "Last Motel in Texas" (the same motel, its signage viewed from the opposite side).

In computer gaming, Murder Motel was an online text game by Sean D. Wagle, hosted on various dial-up bulletin board systems (1980s, originally Color64, ported to various other platforms). The object was for each player to attempt to brutally kill all fellow guests in each room of a motel using a variety of weapons.

In theatre, the seedy motel room has been the setting for two-hander plays such as Same Time, Next Year (1975) and Bug (2006). Both were later adapted as films. Broadway musicals have also paid homage to the lowbrow reputation of motel culture, demonstrated by songs such as "The No-Tel Motel" from Prettybelle and "At the Bed-D-by Motel" from Lolita, My Love.

The British soap opera Crossroads was set in a motel in the English Midlands which was originally based on American-style motels with chalets but later was transformed into a luxury country hotel.

A run-down motel was used as the relocated residence of the unfortunate Rose family in the Emmy Award-winning series Schitt's Creek. As the show progressed, Johnny Rose and Stevie Budd venture into turning old motels into authentic boutique motels. In one episode, a presidential suite is seen complete with era-correct furniture.

== See also ==
- List of motels
- List of defunct hotel chains (includes motels)
