= Gartz Court =

Houses in Pasadena, California

- U.S. National Register of Historic Places
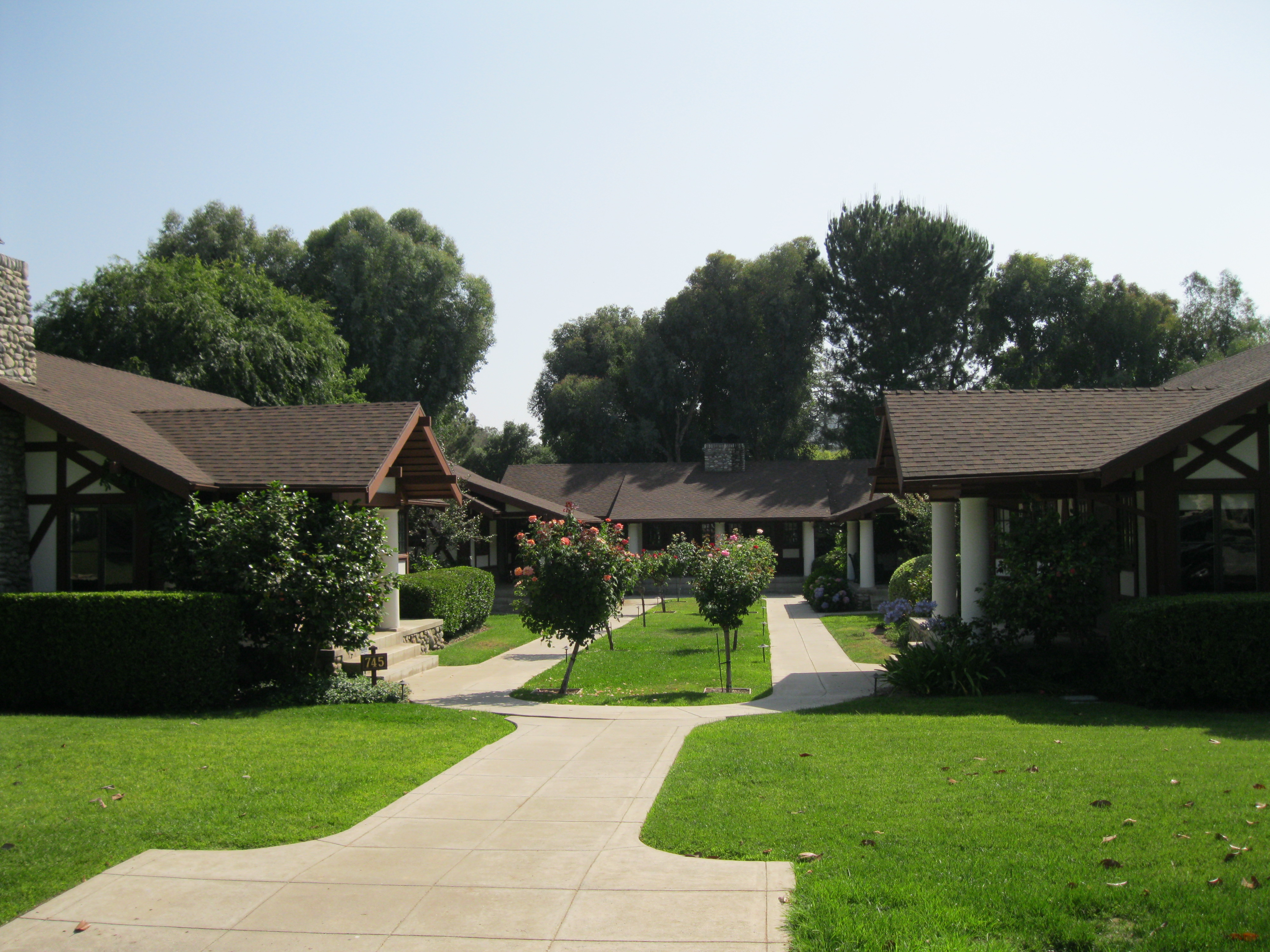

- Location within the Los Angeles metropolitan area Location within California Location within the United States
- Location: 745 N. Pasadena Ave., Pasadena, California
- Coordinates: 34°9′26″N 118°9′36″W
- Area: 0.5 acres (0.20 ha)
- Built: 1910
- Architect: Hunt, Myron & Grey, Elmer
- Architectural style: English Cottage-Craftsmen
- MPS: Bungalow Courts of Pasadena TR
- NRHP reference No.: 83001195
- Added to NRHP: August 25, 1983

Gartz Court is a bungalow court located at 745 N. Pasadena Ave. in Pasadena, California. The court consists of five buildings containing six residential units, which surround an oval rose garden and walkways. Built in 1910, the court, along with Bowen Court, is one of the oldest remaining in Pasadena. The court was commissioned by Kate Crane Gartz, the heir to Crane Plumbing, and was designed by Myron Hunt and Elmer Grey. The homes' designs were influenced by the English Arts and Crafts Movement and feature stone chimneys, wood shingled skirts, and Tudor Revival-style half-timbering. The court was originally located at 270 N. Madison Ave., but was moved to its current location in 1984 to save it from demolition.

The court was added to the National Register of Historic Places on August 25, 1983.
