= House at 1233 Wentworth Ave. =

Historic house in California, United States

- U.S. National Register of Historic Places
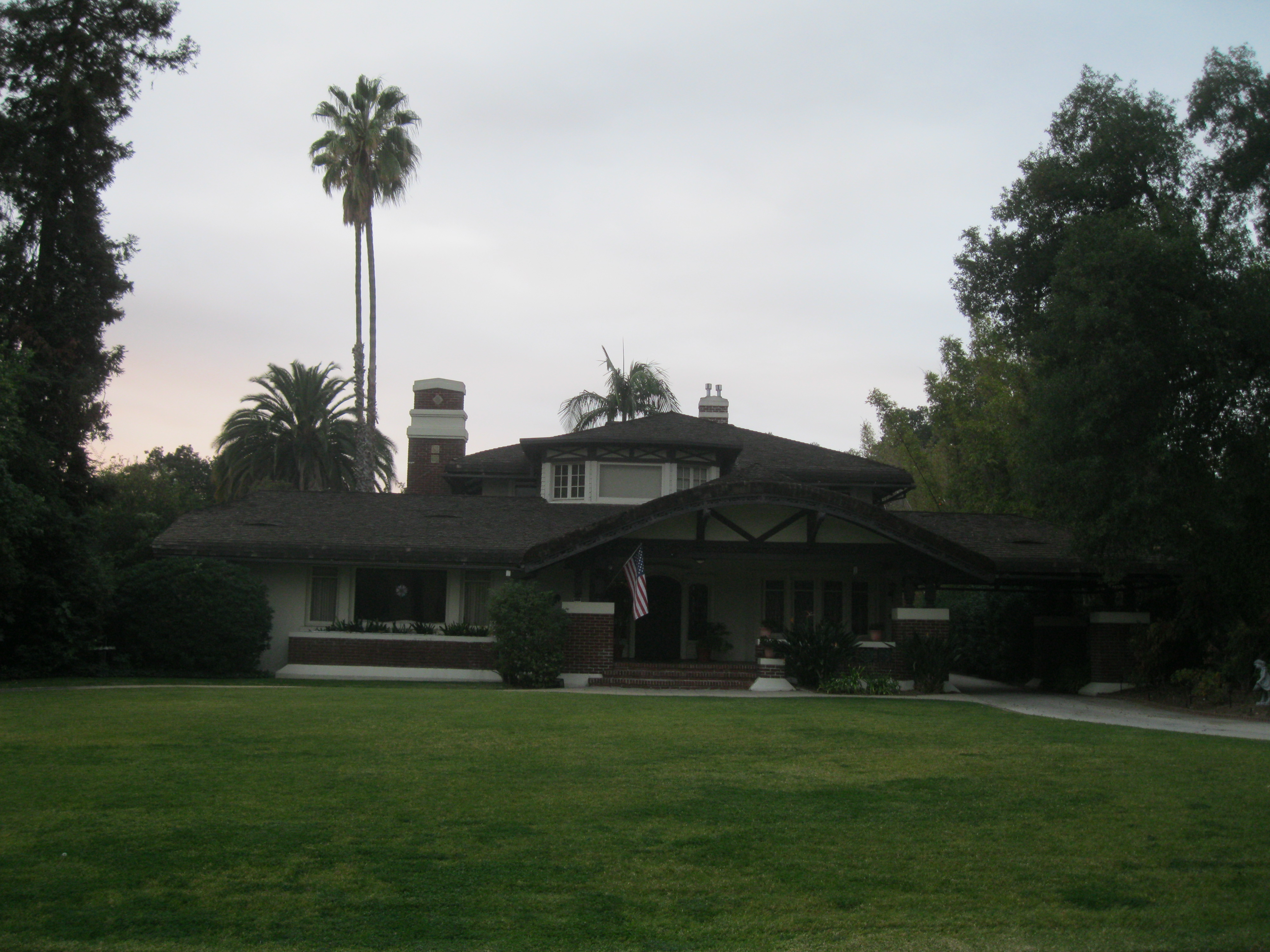

- Location within the Los Angeles metropolitan area Location within California Location within the United States
- Location: 1233 Wentworth Ave., Pasadena, California
- Coordinates: 34°7′32″N 118°8′3″W
- Area: less than one acre
- Built: 1917
- Architect: Heineman, Arthur S.
- Architectural style: Cotswold Cottage
- MPS: Residential Architecture of Pasadena: Influence of the Arts and Crafts Movement MPS
- NRHP reference No.: 98000962
- Added to NRHP: August 6, 1998

The House at 1233 Wentworth Ave. is a historic house located at 1233 Wentworth Avenue in Pasadena, California. Architect Arthur S. Heineman designed the Cotswold style house, which was built in 1917 for Lydia C. Edmonds. The large front entrance porch is topped by an arched roof supported by wooden beams and wide brick piers. The gable end of this entrance is decorated with half-timbering, while the porch itself has a bargeboard pattern. The house's roof has a wide, low-lying horizontal component over the front of the first story and a smaller hipped component above the second-story section; both roofs have rolled eaves and wooden shingles, which replaced the original thatch covering in the 1920s. A contributing Cotswold style garage and gazebo are located behind the house.

The house was added to the National Register of Historic Places on August 6, 1998.
