= Motel Inn =

First motel in the world

Coordinates: 35°17′28.57″N 120°38′53.21″W

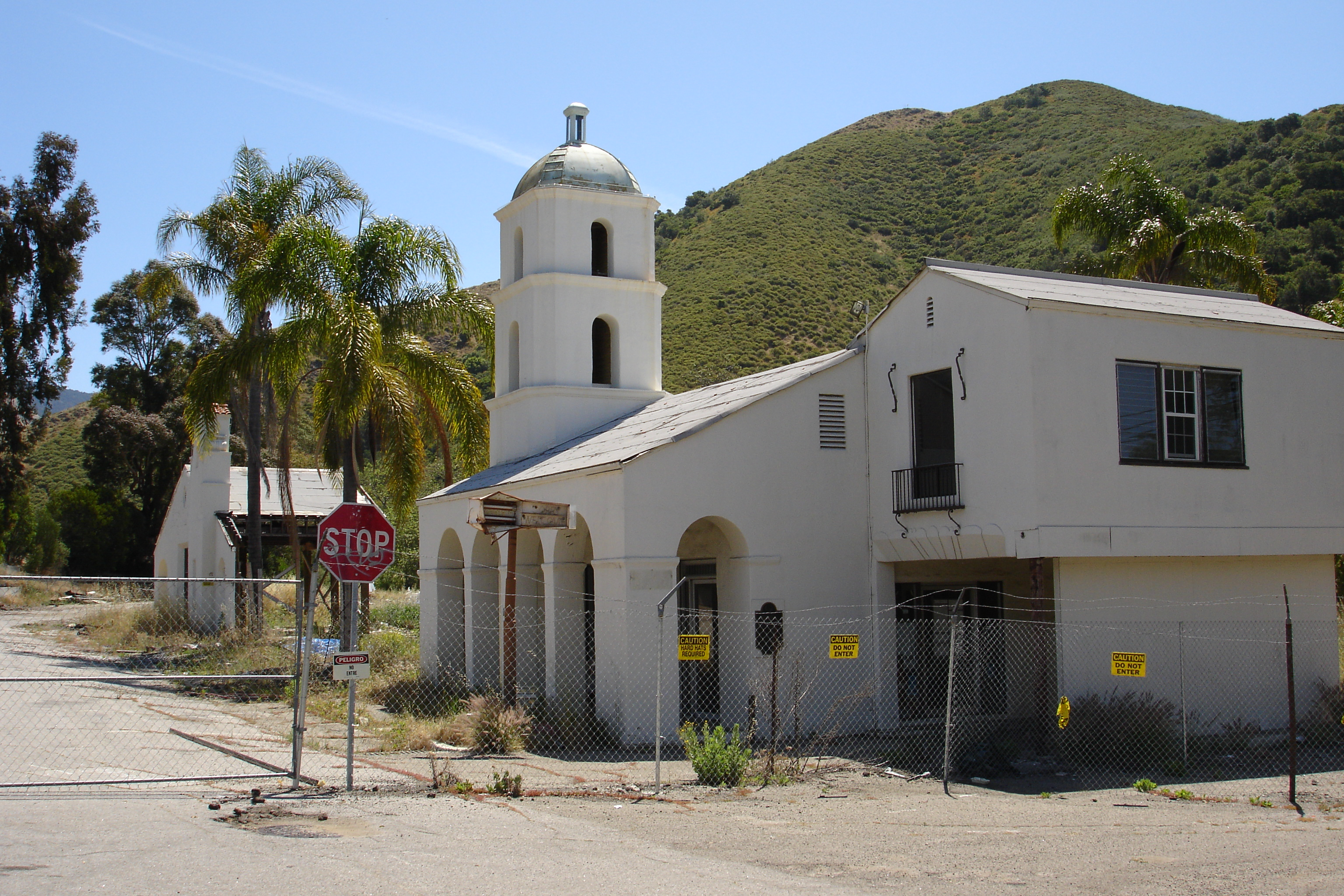
The former Milestone Mo-Tel, San Luis Obispo, California, 2005.

The Motel Inn in San Luis Obispo, California, United States, was the first "motel" in the world, and the origin of that word, from "Mo-Tel", which is a portmanteau "hotel" by combining the words "motor hotel". Originally known as the Milestone Mo-Tel, it opened on December 12, 1925, and closed in 1991.

== Concept ==
Photographed in 1976

1976

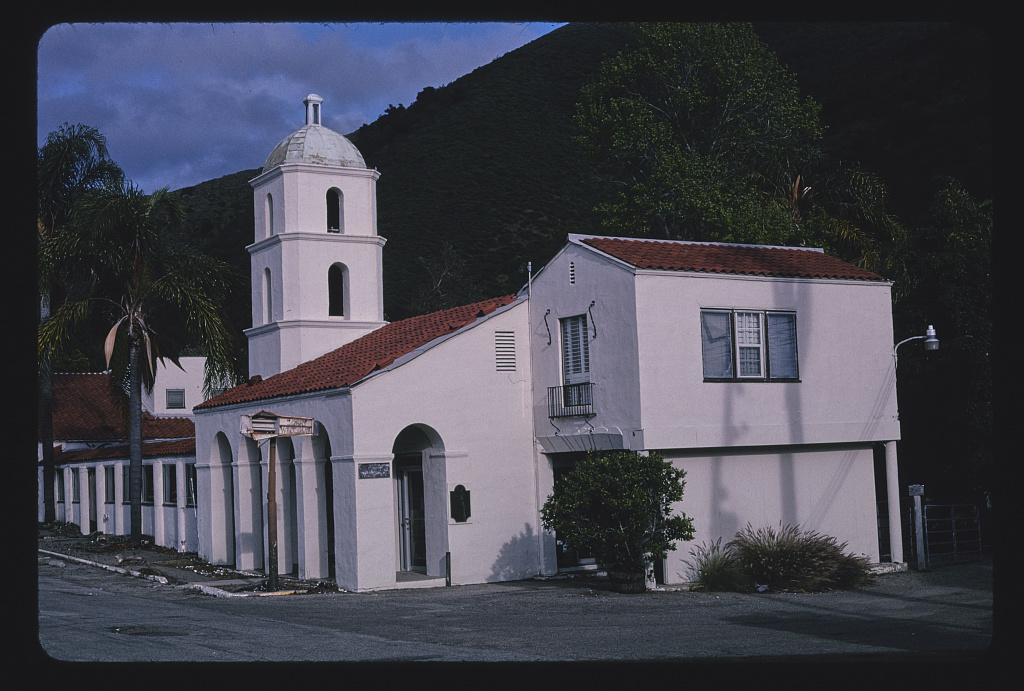
Photographed in 2003

The emergence and popularization of the automobile in the United States of the early 20th century inspired many car owners beyond commuting into town. The poor roads of the era, combined with lower vehicle speeds and reliability, required two or more days of nearly all day driving for 400-mile (640 km) trips such as Los Angeles to San Francisco. Nearby destinations of 40 miles (64 km) or less could be visited in a day to include a return trip. Longer trips required an overnight stay and often left travelers looking for places to pitch tents – or sleep in their automobile – if prior arrangements hadn't been made in destinations or stopovers that happened to have hotels or inns.

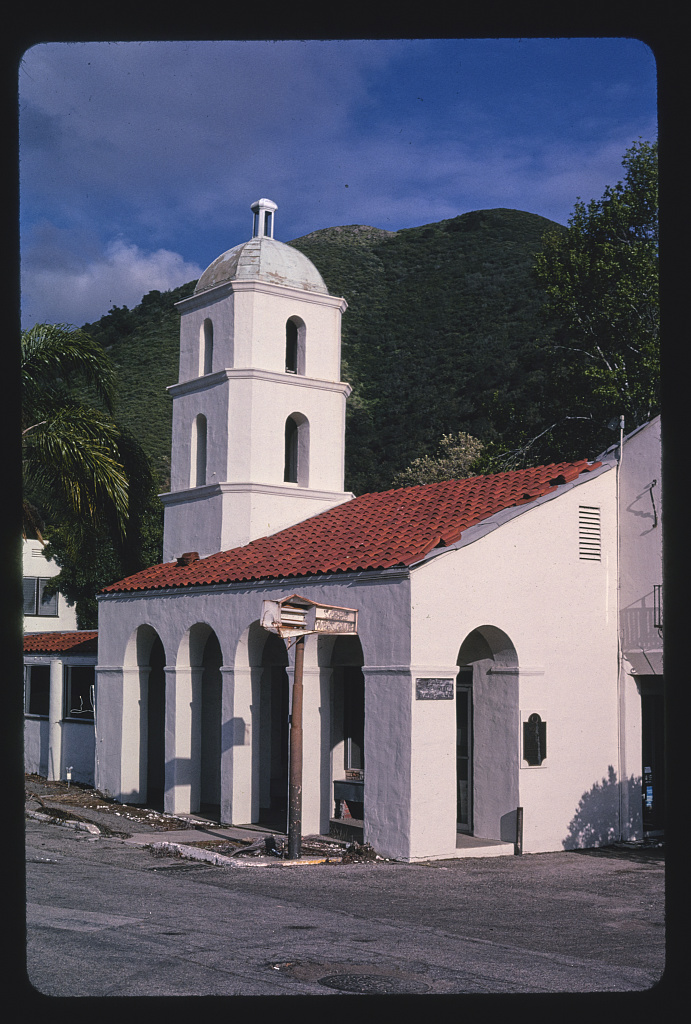
2003

The lack of niche accommodations to fill the need for automobile travelers who only needed an overnight stay to continue their trip inspired many entrepreneurs. The combination of the convenience of a campground with the comforts and respectability of a hotel or inn spurred the creation of the motel. The hotel's architect, Arthur S. Heineman (1878–1974), picked San Luis Obispo as a midpoint location between Los Angeles and San Francisco, which took two days of driving on the roads at the time.

== Architecture ==
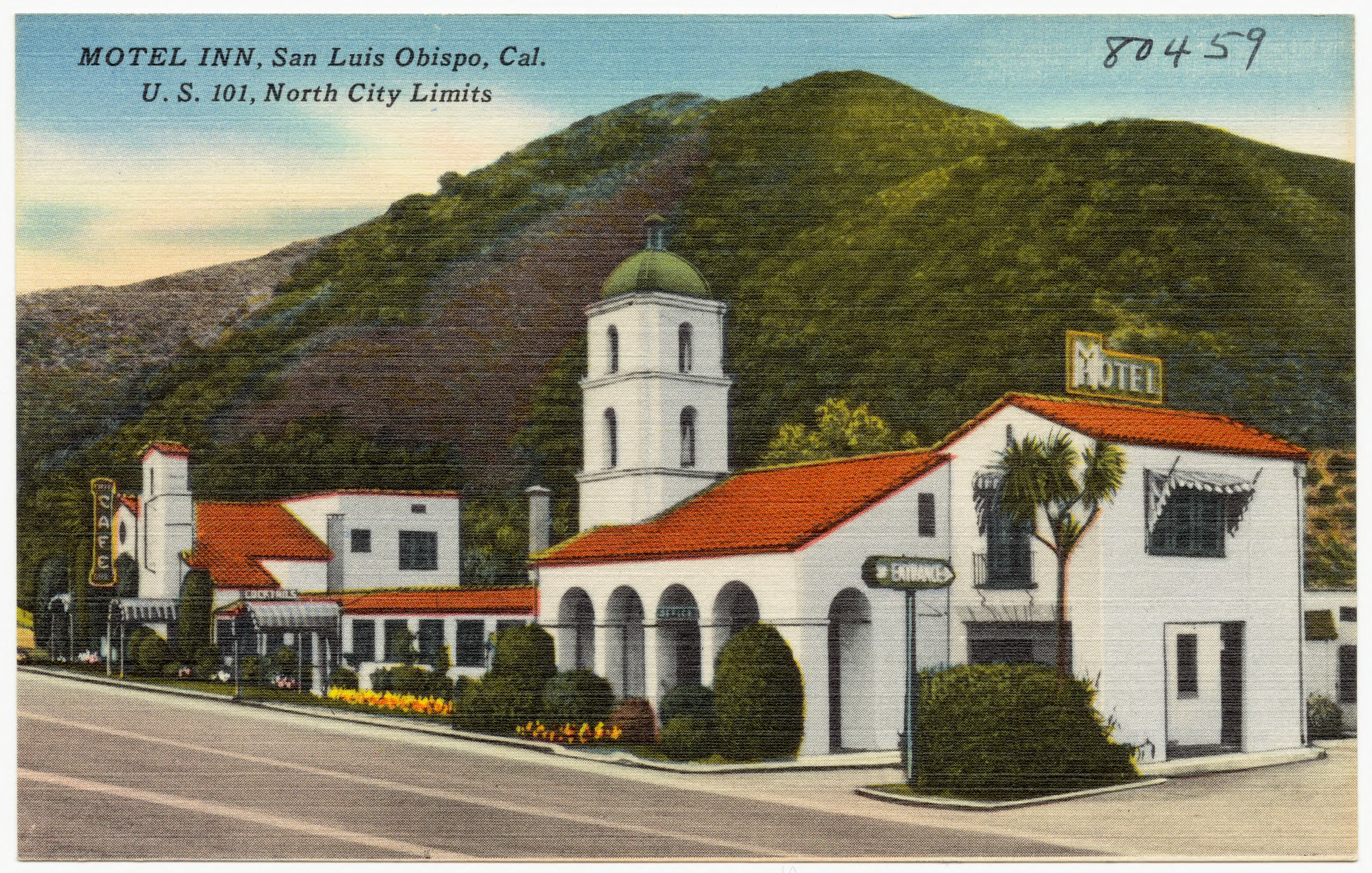
Postcard c.1940s

The original plan of the Milestone Mo-Tel was to include both bungalows and attached apartments with parking outside each unit, though some would have a private garage. Each location of the chain was to include laundry facilities, a grocery store, and a restaurant. Each unit included an indoor bathroom with a shower, obviously a level of privacy not found at campgrounds. The exterior of the buildings was modeled after the Spanish missions in California; the three-stage bell tower was a reflection of the Mission San Luis Rey de Francia in Oceanside.

== Business ==
The motel cost $80,000 to build in 1925 ($1.47 million in 2025 dollars). It originally charged $1.25 per night per room ($23 in 2025 dollars).

The Milestone Interstate Corporation, created by Arthur Heineman and his brother Alfred, was incorporated in an attempt to seek capital from outside investors in order to build a chain of eighteen motor courts at 150-mile (240 km)–200-mile (320 km) intervals in response to the growth in automobile travel in California, Oregon, and Washington. At the time, this spacing would have represented a day's drive between sites. The Motel Inn (as the Milestone Mo-Tel was renamed) was intended to be the prototype for the proposed chain.

The Heinemans were unable to register the name as a trademark, which allowed competitors to use the name. Severe competition in the market as well as competitors with lesser designs but lower pricing also hampered the chain in getting off the ground.

The plans for expansion as a chain ultimately disintegrated as the Great Depression caused investment dollars to become scarce and ultimately caused the Heineman brothers to lose the one existing Motel Inn property to foreclosure.

== Today ==
The Motel Inn closed in 1991. Many of the buildings were torn down in 2006; only two fragments of the original buildings exist, including the mission-style bell tower.

Located at 2223 Monterey Street, at the end of the street next to an on-ramp to U.S. Route 101, the Motel Inn is now the administrative building of the hotel next door, the Apple Farm Inn, at 2015 Monterey Street. The complex is expanding and incorporating parts of the original hotel that are still standing into additional guest rooms.

== See also ==
- List of motels
- City of San Luis Obispo Historic Resources
