= House at 674 Elliot Drive =

Historic house in California, United States

- U.S. National Register of Historic Places
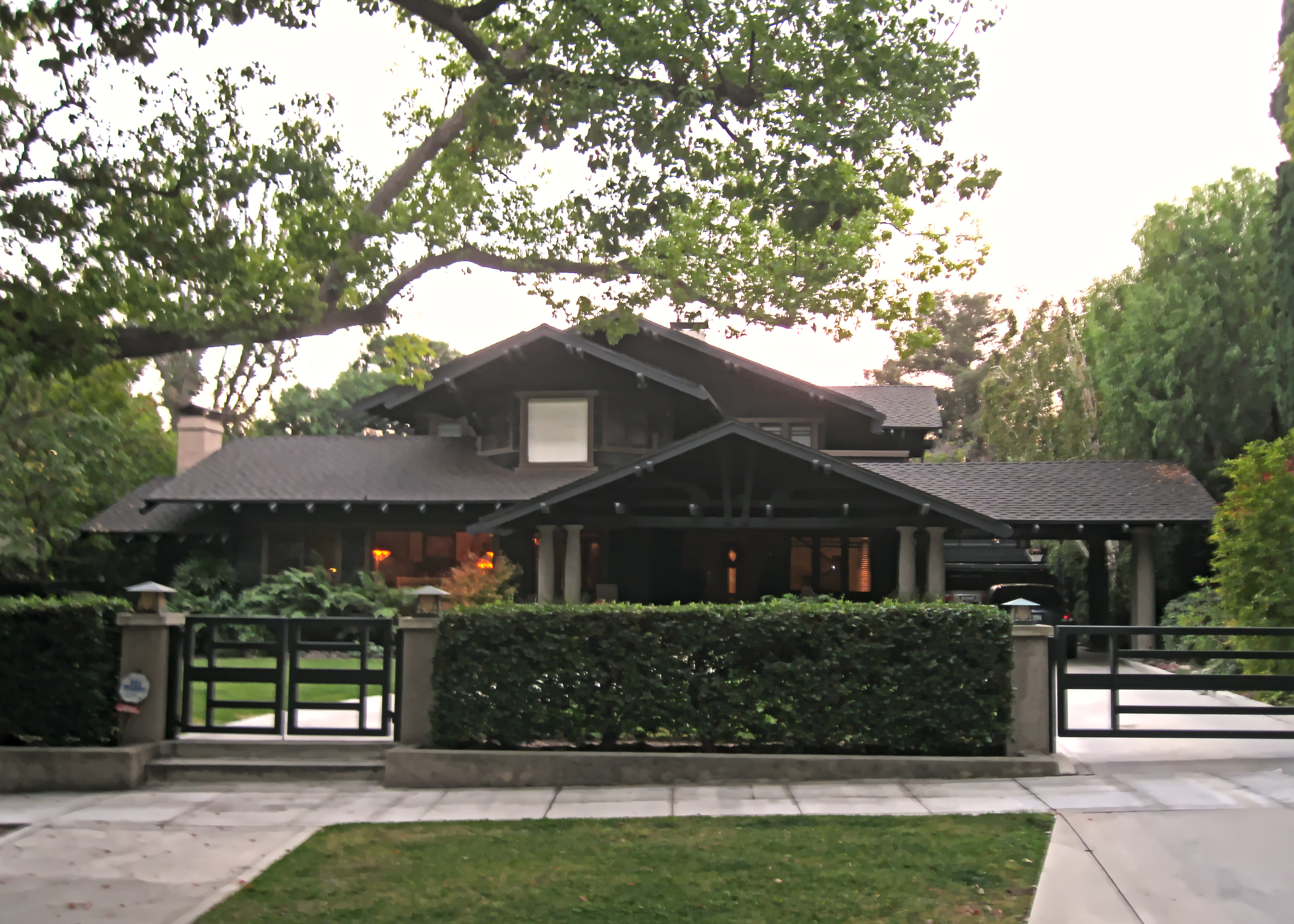

- Location within the Los Angeles metropolitan area Location within California Location within the United States
- Location: 674 Elliot Dr., Pasadena, California
- Coordinates: 34°7′31″N 118°8′10″W
- Area: less than one acre
- Built: 1911
- Architect: Heineman, Arthur S.
- Architectural style: American Craftsman
- MPS: Residential Architecture of Pasadena: Influence of the Arts and Crafts Movement MPS
- NRHP reference No.: 04000325
- Added to NRHP: August 20, 2004

The House at 674 Elliot Drive is a historic home located at 674 Elliot Drive in Pasadena, California, United States. The wood-frame house was built in 1911 for rancher Winslow B. Ross. Architect Arthur Heineman designed the home in the American Craftsman style. The front porch of the house is topped by a large gable supported by Tuscan columns and a patterned system of rafter trusses. Two patios are located on opposite sides of the house; the southeast patio adjoins a pergola-topped pathway through the yard. The house's roof features multiple low-pitched gables and open eaves with exposed rafter tails.

The house was added to the National Register of Historic Places on August 20, 2004.
