= Arthur Heineman =

Arthur S. Heineman (1878–February 1972) was the inventor and primary architect of the world's first motel, the Motel Inn. It was originally called the Milestone Mo-Tel and is located in San Luis Obispo, California. It opened on December 12, 1925. Although it was planned to be only the first of a chain of eighteen motor courts, Heineman was unable to register the name as a trademark, which allowed competitors to use the name, and his plans to extend the concept himself were scuttled.

He also designed (or co-designed, together with one or both of his brothers) a number of notable houses in Pasadena, California, including the following homes:

- The Parsons house at 444 E. California Blvd., built during 1909–10
- Bowen Court, at 539 E. Villa St., a large L-shaped house built during 1910–12 that is the oldest bungalow court style house in Pasadena (and is listed in the National Register of Historic Places)
- The house at 674 Elliot Drive, a wood-frame house in the American Craftsman style built in 1911 (listed on the National Register of Historic Places)
- The house at 1186 W. 27th St., which is one of only a few houses in the American Craftsman style in its historic neighborhood
- The house at 1233 Wentworth Ave., a Cotswold style house built in 1917 (listed in the National Register of Historic Places)
- The house at 4051 W. 7th Street, built in 1915 and located within the Wilshire Park Historic Preservation Overlay Zone.

== Heineman's background and businesses ==
Heineman moved with his family from Chicago to Pasadena, and he started his career as a real estate speculator, as did his brothers Alfred and Herbert. He finished his first buildings in 1905. Around 1906, he formed a partnership called "Heineman and Heineman" together with Herbert, who was a successful building contractor. He eventually became a registered architect, despite having no formal training, and began working together with his other brother Alfred, who was also an (untrained and unregistered) architect. Despite Arthur's name being listed first in their partnership, named "Arthur S. Heineman, Architect and Alfred Heineman, Associates", Alfred became the de facto chief designer of the two, and they would continue to work together until about 1939.
