= Bowen Court =

- U.S. National Register of Historic Places
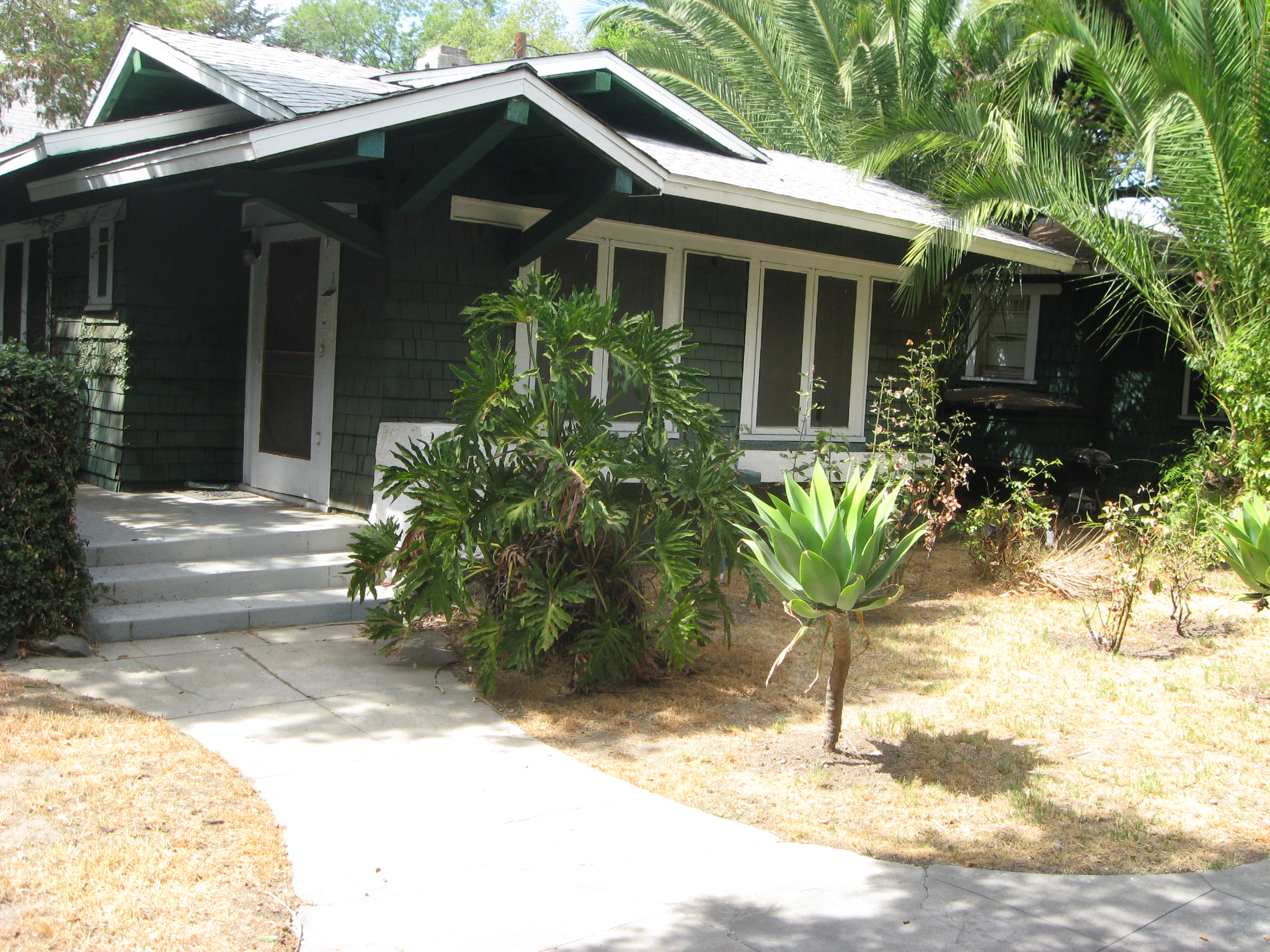

- Location within the Los Angeles metropolitan area Location within California Location within the United States
- Location: 539 E. Villa St., Pasadena, California
- Coordinates: 34°9′16″N 118°8′21″W
- Built: 1910–12
- NRHP reference No.: 82002194
- Added to NRHP: June 17, 1982

Bowen Court is a bungalow court located at 539 E. Villa St. in Pasadena, Los Angeles County, California. The court includes 23 bungalows arranged in an "L" shape and is one of the largest bungalow courts in southern California. Built from 1910 to 1912, Bowen Court is the oldest bungalow court in Pasadena. The court was designed by Arthur and Alfred Heineman, who planned the court around a Craftsman style courtyard.

The court was listed on the National Register of Historic Places on June 17, 1982.

== See also ==
- National Register of Historic Places listings in Pasadena, California
