= Black Flag (insecticide) =

Insect-killing brand of products

Black Flag is the oldest insecticide brand in the United States. Established in 1833, Black Flag makes a variety of products designed for killing and controlling insects and other arthropods including ants, cockroaches, spiders, fleas, flies, yellowjackets, wasps, bees, hornets, and scorpions.

Black Flag also makes a series of pesticide-free insect traps, under the "Motel" brand, including its Roach Motel, Fly Motel, and Yellow Jacket Motel. The common slogan for all of these is that the insects thus trapped "check in, but they don't check out". The traps are disposable and are meant to be discarded once full.

In 2011, Black Flag was purchased by Spectrum Brands.
