= Roach Motel =

Roach bait device

- Product type: Insect trap
- Current owner: Black Flag
- Country: United States
- Introduced: 1976; 50 years ago
- Registered as a trademark in: United States
- Tagline: Roaches check in, but they don't check out!

Roach Motel is an American brand of a roach bait device designed to catch cockroaches. Although the term is the subject of a trademark registration by the insect control brand Black Flag, the phrase roach motel has come to be used as a reference to all traps that use a scent or other form of bait to lure cockroaches into a compartment in which a sticky substance causes them to become trapped. Introduced in late 1976 in response to the success of d-CON's roach trap, the Roach Motel quickly became a successful entrant in the industry. By 1979, New York magazine reported: "On the strength of its whimsical packaging and an aggressive ad campaign, the Roach Motel now dominates the market, outselling the closest competition by as much as three to one in some cities".

Early versions of the Roach Motels used food-based bait, but later designs incorporated pheromones. The widely known tagline of the Roach Motel was, "Roaches check in, but they don't check out!" This phrase has also been applied to information technology systems such as enterprise resource planning, which readily capture transaction data but make it difficult for organizations to access, report and analyze the data stored in the system.

Black Flag also marketed a related insect trap, the "Flyport", designed to deal with unwanted flying insects like houseflies, with the tagline, "Lots of arrivals, but no departures!" It was less successful than the Roach Motel.

"Roach Motel" is United States federal trademark No. 1,059,314, for which Black Flag claims a date of earliest use of May 7, 1976.
