= De Havilland Canada Dash 7 =

1975 airliner family with 4 turboprop engines

Dash 7
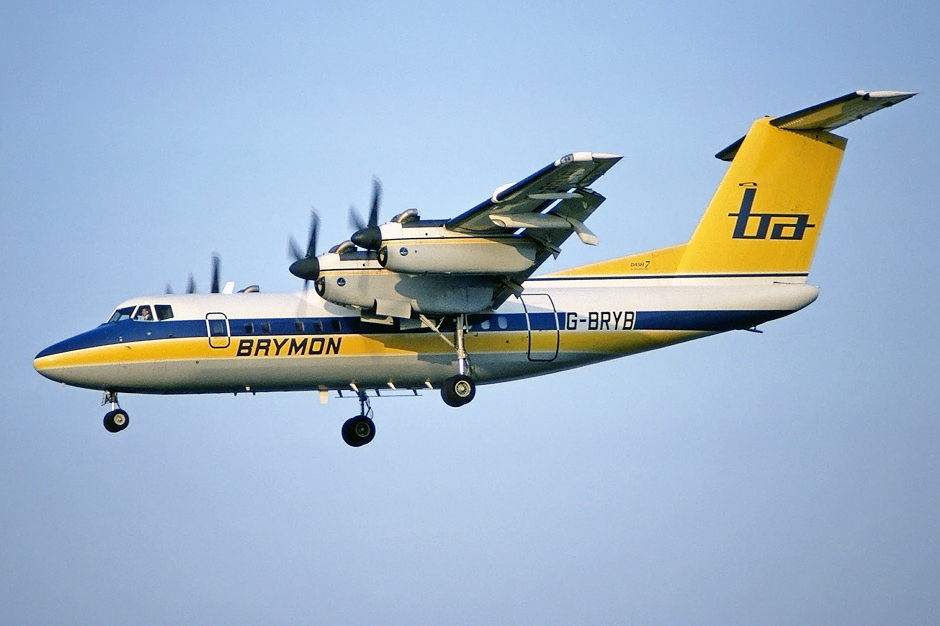
- Brymon Airways Dash 7 in 1983

General information
- Type: STOL regional airliner
- National origin: Canada
- Manufacturer: de Havilland Canada
- Status: In limited service
- Primary users: Various airlines Canadian Forces; United States Army; Air Tindi
- Number built: 114

History
- Manufactured: 1975–1988
- Introduction date: February 3, 1978
- First flight: March 27, 1975
- Developed into: De Havilland Canada Dash 8

The de Havilland Canada DHC-7, popularly known as the Dash 7, is a turboprop-powered regional airliner with short take-off and landing (STOL) performance. Variants were built with 50–54 seats. It first flew in 1975 and remained in production until 1988 when the parent company, de Havilland Canada, was purchased by Boeing in 1986 and later sold to Bombardier. In 2006 Bombardier sold the type certificate for the aircraft design to Viking Air, which was later reorganized as De Havilland Canada.

== Design and development ==
In the 1960s, de Havilland Canada was already well known worldwide for their series of high-performance STOL aircraft, notably the very popular DHC-2 Beaver and DHC-6 Twin Otter. However, these aircraft were generally fairly small and served outlying routes, as opposed to the busier regional airliner routes which were already well served by larger, higher-performance turboprop aircraft such as the Fokker F27, Fairchild F-27, Convair 580, Convair 600 and Hawker Siddeley 748.

The de Havilland Canada company personnel felt they could compete with these designs in a roundabout way. With their excellent STOL performance, their designs could fly into smaller airports located in city centres and smaller, outlying, more austere airports having runways that the other aircraft could not easily use (unpaved, unimproved). The original specification called for an aircraft that could carry 40 passengers and operating from runways only 2,000 ft long (610 m), and designed for, with a full load of passengers, the ability to fly 700 nautical miles (1296km), or a range of 805 miles (1,296 km). (Note: Obtained from the formula "sm = nm ·1.15". For comparison, the range is 795 miles (1,279 km) for the 50-passenger DHC-Dash 7 (Srs 100) according to description found in website of BAE Systems)

With new noise restrictions coming into effect throughout the 1970s, an aircraft tailored for this role would also have to be very quiet. Propeller noise is a factor of blade length and chord and the speed at which it rotates. To meet these new regulations, the new design used much larger (oversized) propellers geared to rotate at a lower speed than is normally designed. Much of the problem sound from a typical propeller is generated at the tips of the blades which are rotating at or just beneath the speed of sound. By using oversize propeller blades, there is no need to have the blade tip reaching near the speed of sound, and the rotating speed can therefore be reduced without sacrificing thrust. In reducing the speed, this noise is reduced substantially. The Dash 7 often landed at only 900 rpm, and took off at only 1,210 rpm.

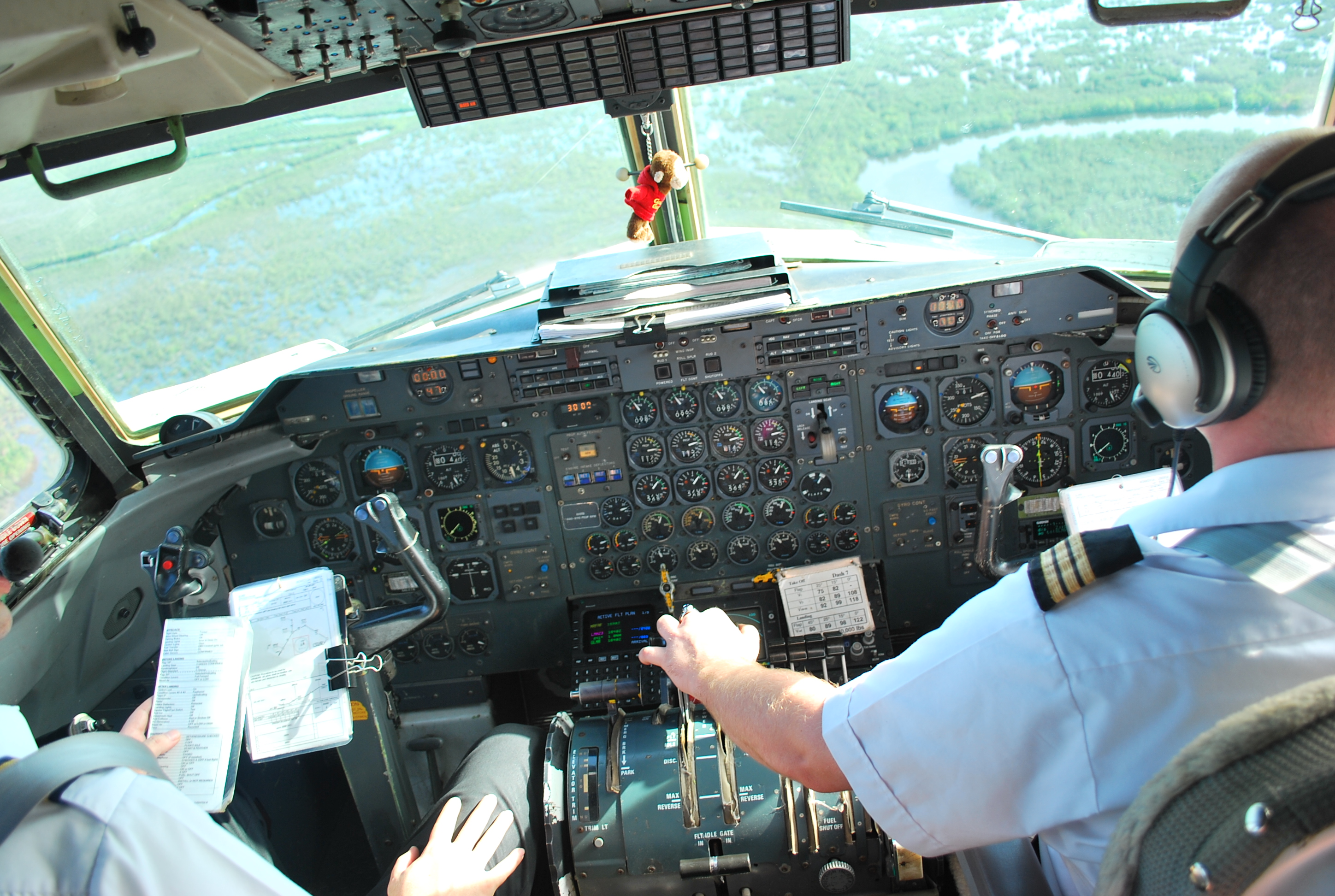
Dash 7 flight deck

In other respects, the new DHC-7 was essentially a larger, four-engine version of the Twin Otter: the general layout remained similar, with a high aspect ratio, high-mounted wing, and similar details of the cockpit and nose profile. Changes included the addition of cabin pressurization (requiring a switch to a fuselage with a circular cross-section), landing gear that folded forward into the inner engine nacelles, and a large T-tail intended to keep the elevator clear of the propwash during take-off (the Twin Otter's empennage was a cruciform arrangement).

The Twin Otter incorporated "flaperons" that drooped the ailerons as part of the flaps, but these were not included in the Dash 7 due to weight and complexity. Instead, the ailerons were reduced in size to allow more flap area, and were augmented with two sets of roll spoilers, or spoilerons. The inboard roll spoilers operate at all speeds. while the outboard roll spoilers only operate at speeds less than 130 knots (150 mph; 240 km/h) indicated air speed to allow for more roll control at slower speeds. Upon touchdown, both the inboard and outboard roll spoilers extend in unison to aid in destroying lift created by the wing. Each wing also includes two ground spoilers which only extend on touchdown. Most of the trailing edge is spanned by a complex, double Fowler flap arrangement for high lift at low speed. During a typical STOL landing, flaps are selected to the 45° position, generating more lift and drag, thus allowing for steeper descents and lower approach speeds. Depending on weight, the V_{REF} speed with flaps at 45° is between 70 and 85 knots (81 and 98 mph; 130 and 157 km/h). On touchdown, through "squat switches" in the main gear, the flaps automatically retract to the 25° position, thus reducing lift once on the runway and producing better braking performance. The flaps also retract to 25° when engine power is increased during a go-around procedure. The four-engine layout aids lift at low speeds due to the wide span of the propellers blowing air over the wing ("propwash"). When reverse thrust is selected on landing, the props reverse pitch, push air forward, and slow the aircraft very effectively along with the antiskid main wheel brakes. More importantly, if an engine fails, the asymmetric thrust is much less than on a twin-engine layout, thereby increasing safety and allowing for a lower minimum control speed with an engine inoperative.

== Operational history ==
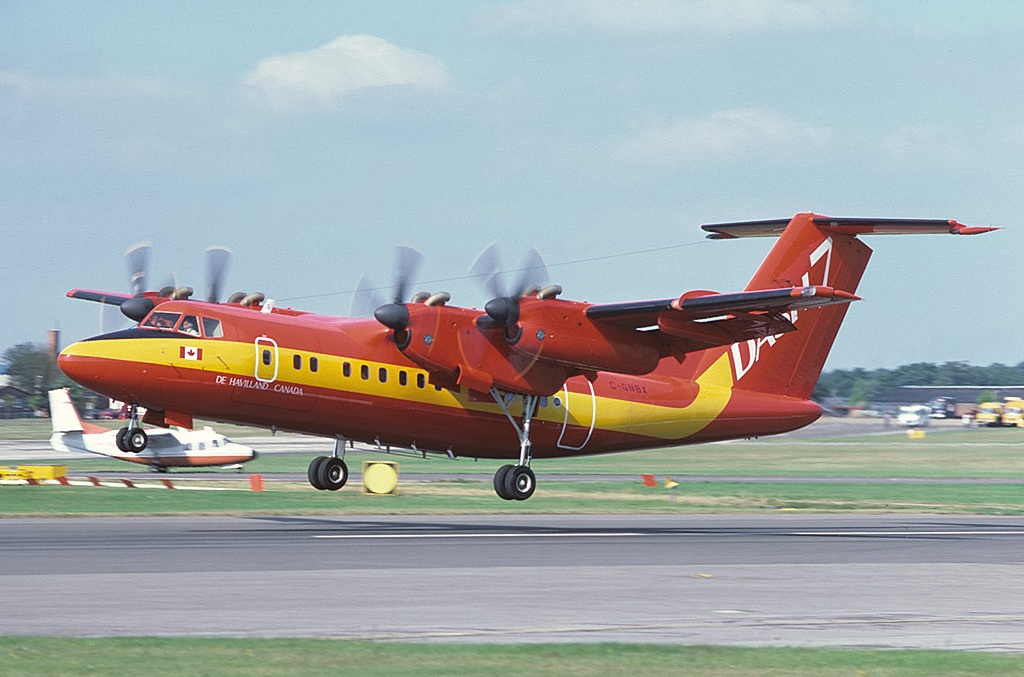
Prototype DHC-7-100 at the 1978 Farnborough Air Show

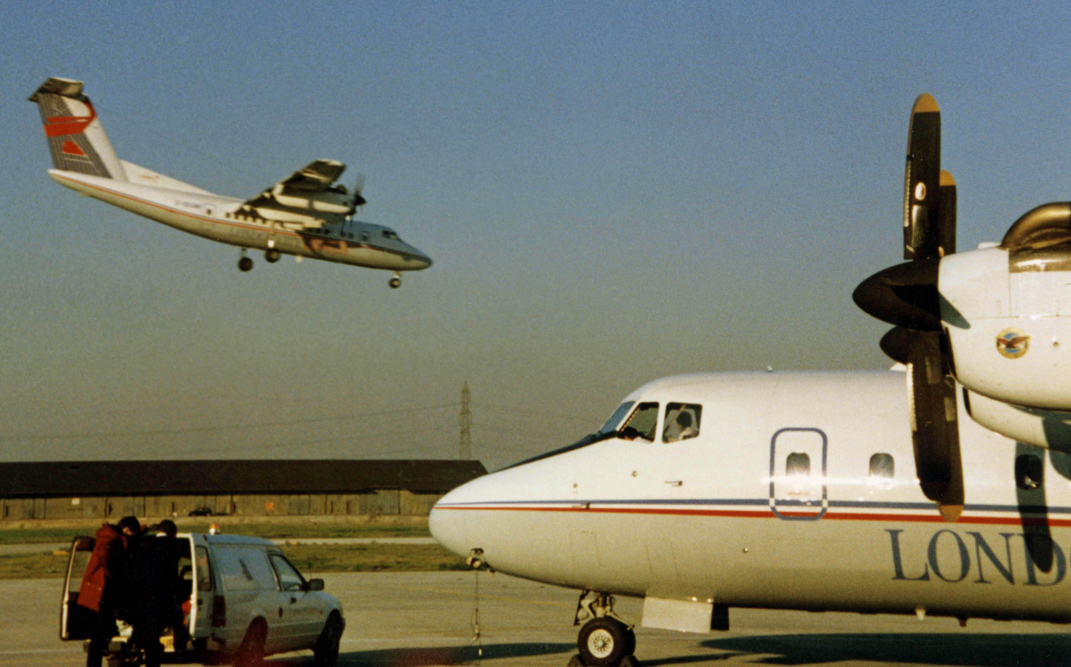
DHC-7 of London City Airways making on approach to London City Airport as another loads in 1988

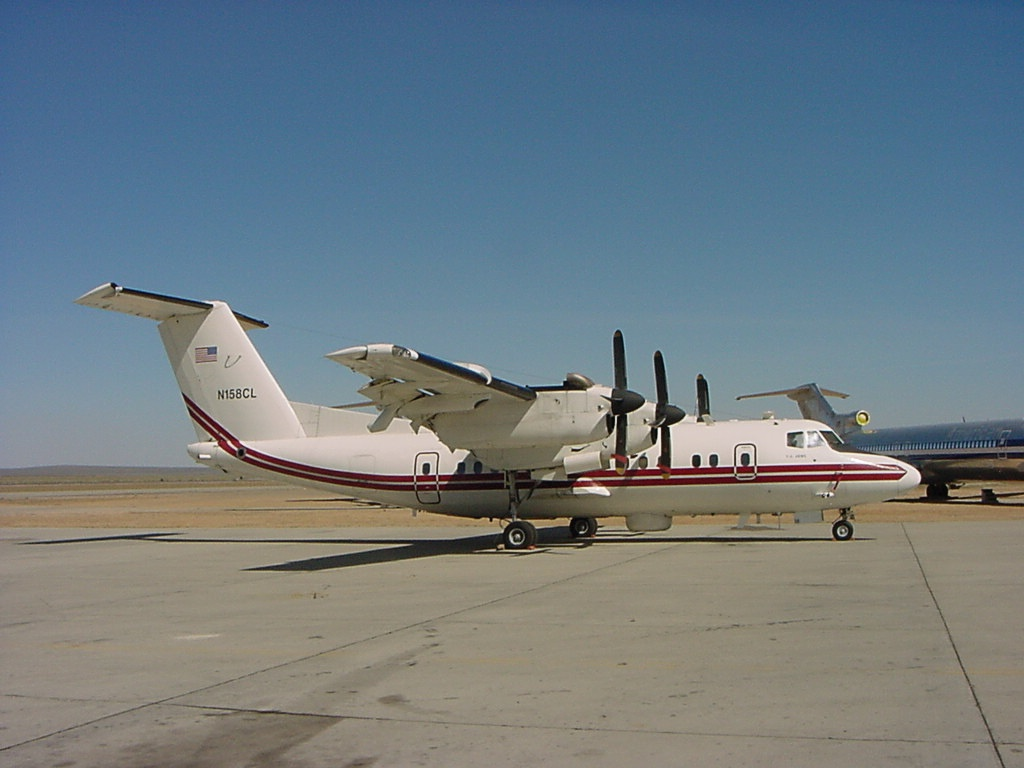
U.S. Army Airborne Reconnaissance Low RC-7B (later EO-5C) at the Mojave Airport in 2001

Development started in 1972 and the prototype first flew on March 27, 1975. Testing went smoothly, and the first delivery took place to Rocky Mountain Airways on February 3, 1978. The Dash 7 enabled Rocky Mountain Airways to operate scheduled passenger air service from Denver into the Avon STOLport in Colorado which was controlled by the airline. The Avon STOLport was located in a mountain valley in close proximity to the Vail, CO ski resort. Another close-in ski resort airfield served by Rocky Mountain Airways with Dash 7 flights from Denver was Steamboat Springs Airport in Colorado. With a relatively short runway length of 4,452 feet and an airfield elevation of 6,882 feet, the Dash 7 was well suited for operations from this airport located in the Rocky Mountains. Flying as Continental Express via a code sharing agreement with Continental Airlines, Rocky Mountain Airways also operated the Dash 7 into the Telluride Airport located in the San Juan Mountains of southwest Colorado with this mountain airport having an airfield elevation of 9,078 feet thus making it one of the highest airports in the U.S.

Kapalua Airport on the island of Maui, Hawaii was built by Hawaiian Airlines with a 3000-foot runway, specifically for Dash 7 operations. Scheduled passenger flights with new Dash 7 turboprops began on March 1, 1987. In 1993, this private airport was acquired by the state of Hawaii.

One hundred Dash 7 turboprops were delivered by 1984, when the production line was put on hold in favour of the Dash 8. Another 13 were delivered between 1984 and 1988, when the production lines were removed when Boeing bought the company. The last Dash 7 was bought by Tyrolean Airways.

The original Series 100 represents the vast majority of the aircraft delivered, and came in two models; the DHC-7-102 passenger version and -103 combi with an enlarged cargo door. These were followed by the Series 110 which met British CAA requirements, including the -110 and -111, and finally the Series 150 which included additional fuel capacity and an improved interior in the -150 and -151. Plans were made for a Series 200 with the new PT6A-50/7 engines which improved hot-and-high power, but these plans were shelved when Boeing ended production of the design.

The mixture of features on the Dash 7 met with limited commercial success. Most commuter airline turboprop operators used the aircraft as feeder liners into large airports, where the STOL performance was not considered important. In comparison to other feeder liners, the Dash 7's four engines required twice the maintenance of a twin-engine model, thereby driving up operational costs. Finally, those airports that did require a high-performance STOL operation were generally small and well served by the Twin Otters; had an airport needed a larger plane to serve its customer base, they would have built a longer runway. One exception to this was operations at London City Airport, which upon opening in 1987, was capable of handling few other aircraft types besides the Dash 7 due to its relatively short runway and steep approach. The runway at London City was subsequently lengthened, and the approach angle reduced somewhat and since accepts airliners such as the Airbus A220, Airbus A318, British Aerospace BAe 146 and Embraer 190 types. Noise criteria remain strict in comparison with other international airports.

The Dash 7 also gained a number of military orders. The first of these was for two aircraft for the Canadian Armed Forces, which needed them to transport high-ranking passengers and freight around Europe. These aircraft received the CF designation CC-132 and were delivered to 412 Transport Squadron at Canadian Forces Base Lahr, in West Germany.

The United States Army operates several Dash 7 aircraft as surveillance platforms with the designation EO-5C (RC-7B before 2004) under the Airborne Reconnaissance Low program.

Transport Canada operates a single DHC-7-150IR aircraft to conduct maritime surveillance, pollution monitoring, and ice patrols as part of the Transport Canada National Aerial Surveillance Program. The aircraft's home base is Ottawa. During the summer, this aircraft conducts patrols throughout the Canadian Arctic, Alaska, and Greenland. During the fall and winter, this aircraft conducts patrols of the Great Lakes and east or west coasts of Canada as required.

The design of a much more conventional twin-engine design commenced at de Havilland in 1978, resulting in the extremely popular Dash 8. The DHC-7 production line eventually delivered 114, of which six have been lost and one scrapped. Many of the rest remain in service.

The American band Wilco released a song called "Dash 7" on their 1995 album A.M.

== Variants ==
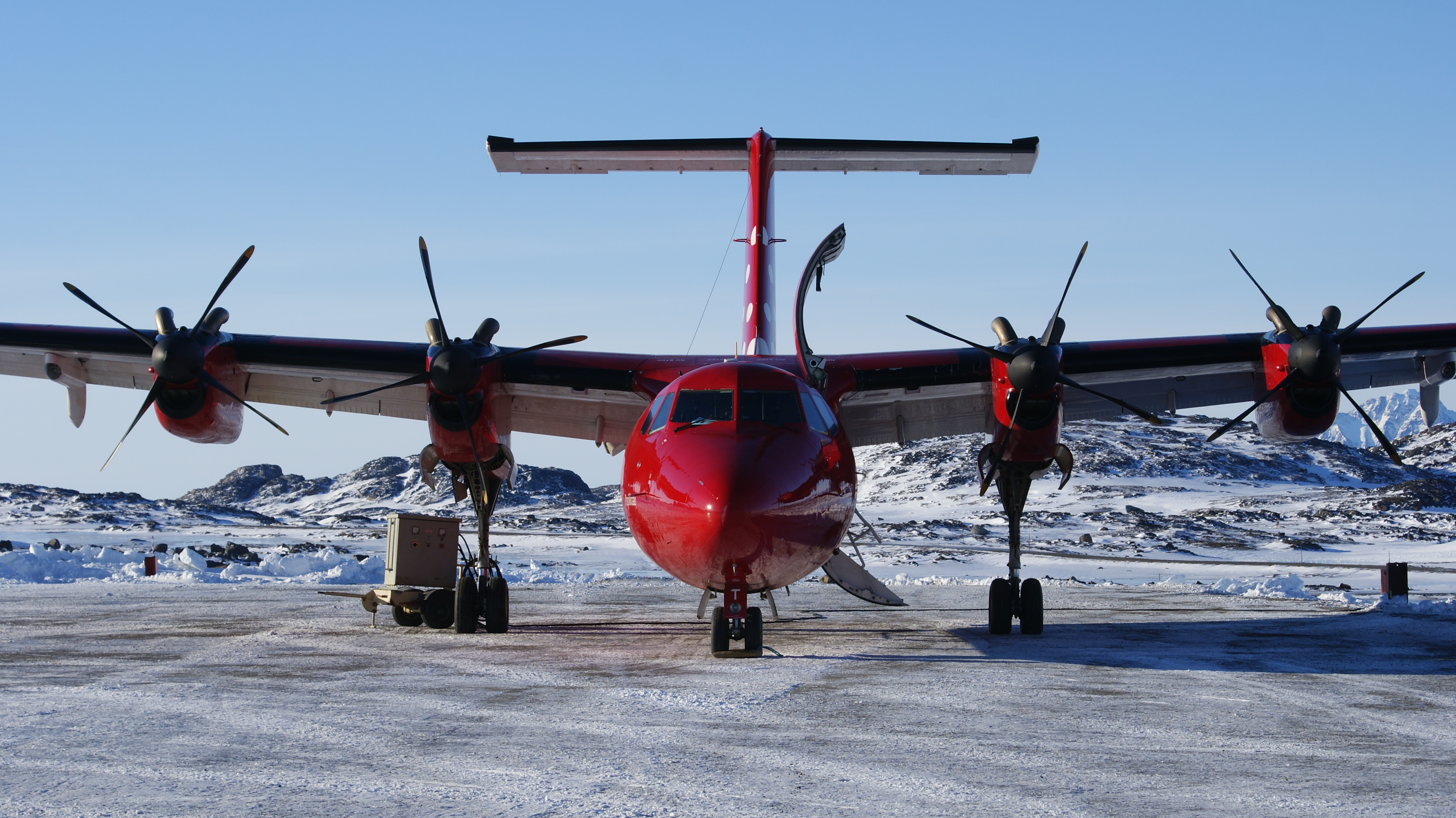
Model 103 operated by Air Greenland with the forward cargo door open

DHC-7-1
Prototypes, two built
DHC-7-100
Production passenger variant with a maximum of 54 passengers (with 43,000 lb or 20,000 kg takeoff weight)
DHC-7-101
Production passenger/cargo variant with a maximum 50 passengers and a left-hand forward cargo door (with 43,000 lb or 20,000 kg takeoff weight)
DHC-7-102
Production passenger variant with a maximum of 54 passengers (with 44,000 lb or 20,000 kg take-off weight)
DHC-7-103
Production passenger/cargo variant with a maximum of 50 passengers and a left-hand forward cargo door (with 44,020 lb or 19,970 kg take-off weight)
DHC-7-110
DHC-7-102 certified for use in the United Kingdom
DHC-7-111
DHC-7-103 certified for use in the United Kingdom
DHC-7-150
Improved 1978 version with higher gross weight, increased fuel capacity, and improved passenger amenities
DHC-7-150IR
One series 150 modified in 1986 for Transport Canada for ice/pollution patrols of the Canadian Arctic
CC-132
Canadian military designation for the Series 102/103
O-5A ARL-I (Airborne Reconnaissance Low – IMINT)
Converted by California Microwave Incorporated 1991–92
EO-5B ARL-C (Airborne Reconnaissance Low – COMINT)
United States military designation for Series 102
EO-5C ARL-M (Airborne Reconnaissance Low – Multi-sensor)
Converted by California Microwave Incorporated 1996
RC-7B ARL-M (Airborne Reconnaissance Low – Multi-sensor)
Redesignated EO-5C in 2004

== Accidents and incidents ==
The de Havilland Canada DHC-7 has been involved in six accidents (and 10 incidents overall) with a total of 68 fatalities.

- April 28, 1982 – an Aerovías Nacionales de Honduras DHC-7-103 was hijacked at Le Ceiba-Goloson International Airport in Honduras with no loss of life.
- May 9, 1982 – an Alyemda DHC-7-103 crashed into sea near Aden International Airport in Yemen, killing 23 of 49 on board.
- June 23, 1982 – a Henson Airlines DHC-7 was hijacked at Staunton-Shenandoah Valley Airport, in Virginia with no lives lost.
- February 15, 1983 – Rio Airways Flight 252 DHC-7-102 was hijacked at Nuevo Laredo, Mexico, with none of 20 on board injured.
- May 6, 1988 – Widerøe Flight 710 DHC-7-102 crashed on a hillside during poor weather near Brønnøysund Airport in Norway, killing 36 on board.
- November 28, 1998 – a DNK Aviation Leasing Group DHC-7-102 crashed after an engine failed during a test flight near Ashburton, United Kingdom killing the crew of two.
- July 23, 1999 – a US Army DHC-7-102 (O-5A) crashed into a mountain near Orito in Putumayo province in Colombia, killing all seven on board.
- September 7, 1999 – a Skyline Nigeria DHC-7-102 was damaged from a belly landing at Port Harcourt Airport with 19 on board (no fatalities).
- September 4, 2002 – Asian Spirit Flight 897 DHC-7-102 slid off the runway at Manila-Ninoy Aquino International Airport with 49 on board (no fatalities).
- May 1, 2006 – Trans Capital Air (a Toronto-based charter company) for United Nations Mission in Liberia (UNMIL) DHC-7-102 crash-landed at Zwedru Airport in Liberia after its landing gear failed to extend, with 40 on board (37 Ethiopian soldiers) all uninjured.

== Operators ==
=== Current airlines and other operators ===
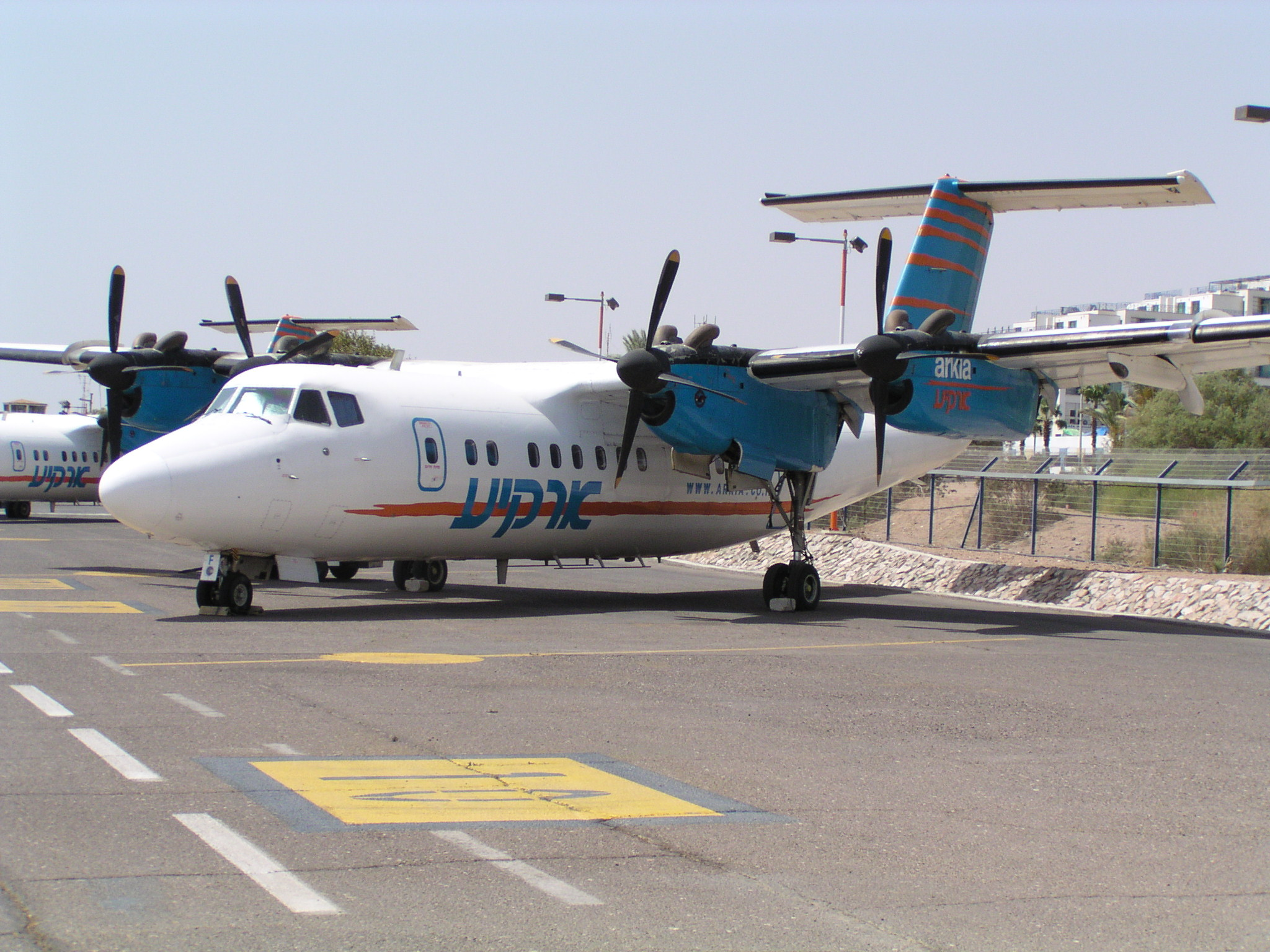
Arkia de Havilland Canada DHC-7 parked at Eilat Airport

As of May 2026, a total of 16 Dash 7 aircraft (all variants) remain in service.

Canada

- Air Tindi (6)
- National Aerial Surveillance Program (1)
- Trans Capital Air (1)

Kenya

- Airkenya Express (2)

United Kingdom

- British Antarctic Survey (1)

United States

- United States Army (5)

=== Former operators ===
Argentina

- Kaikén Líneas Aéreas

Australia

- Jetcraft Aviation

Austria

- Tyrolean Airways

Canada

- Air Atlantic
- AirBC
- City Express
- Time Air
- Trans Capital Air
- Wardair (both aircraft named 'Don Braun')
- Voyageur Airways

Colombia

- Helicol

Denmark

- Maersk Air

Greenland

- Air Greenland

Guatemala

- Aviones Comerciales de Guatemala (Avcom)
- Aéro Ruta Maya

Honduras

- Sahsa

Indonesia

- Pelita Air Service (2)

Israel

- Arkia

Malaysia

- Berjaya Air

New Zealand

- Newmans Air

Nigeria

- Skyline (Nigeria)

Norway

- Widerøes Flyveselskap
- DNK Aviation Leasing Group

Papua New Guinea

- Air Niugini

Philippines

- Asian Spirit
- Zest Airways (Formerly Asian Spirit, now Air Asia Zest)

Slovenia

- Adria Airways

South Africa

- Inter Air - Operated one aircraft

Tanzania

- Regional Air Services (Tanzania)

Turkey

- Turkish Airlines

United Kingdom

- Brymon
- London City Airways

United States

- Air Oregon
- Air Pacific (United States) (commuter airline based in California, acquired by Golden Gate Airlines)
- Air West (commuter air carrier in Texas not to be confused with Hughes Air West)
- Air Wisconsin
- Allegheny Commuter
- Atlanta Express Airline Corp.
- Atlantic Southeast Airlines (ASA) (subsequently renamed as ExpressJet)
- Branson Airways
- Continental Express (operated by Rocky Mountain Airways in code share service for Continental Airlines)
- Crown Airways (operated on Allegheny Commuter service)
- Delta Connection (operated by Atlantic Southeast Airlines (ASA) and Rio Airways in code share services for Delta Air Lines)
- Era Aviation (operated code share service for Alaska Airlines in Alaska)
- Golden Gate Airlines
- Golden West Airlines
- Gulfstream International Airlines
- Hawaiian Airlines
- Henson Airlines (operated code share service for Piedmont Airlines)
- MarkAir Express (operated code share service for MarkAir in Alaska)
- Maverick Airways (operated code share service in Colorado for the current version of Frontier Airlines)
- Pan Am Express (operated by Ransome Airlines for Pan Am via a code sharing agreement)
- Paradise Island Airlines
- Ransome Airlines
- Rio Airways
- Rocky Mountain Airways – worldwide launch customer
- Ross Aviation
- Trans World Express (operated by Ransome Airlines on behalf of TWA via a code sharing agreement)
- USAir Express

Venezuela

- Conviasa
- Linea Turistica Aerotuy (1)

South Yemen

- Alyemda

=== Other civilian operators ===
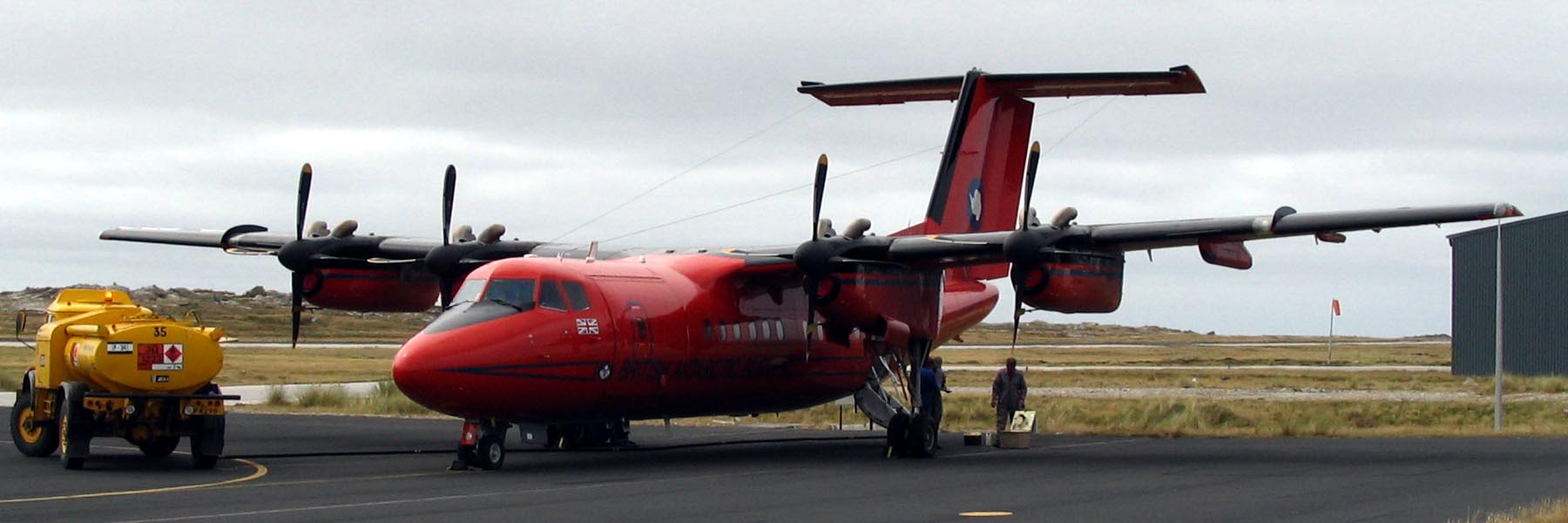
The British Antarctic Survey (BAS) Dash 7 at Stanley on the Falkland Islands.

The British Antarctic Survey operates a single Dash 7 in support of its research programme in Antarctica. The aircraft undertakes regular shuttle flights between either Stanley on the Falkland Islands, or Punta Arenas, Chile, and the Rothera Research Station on Adelaide Island. It also operates to and from the ice runway at the Sky Blu conducting coastal pollution and ice patrols across the Canadian Arctic.

=== Military operators ===
Canada

- Canadian Forces (two delivered 1979 to Canadian Air Mobility Tasking for use at CFB Lahr, flown until 1987 - replaced by DHC-8)

United States

- United States Army (10 – 1 O-5A, 2 EO-5B, 5 RC-7B)

Venezuela

- Venezuelan Navy (one delivered in 1982)

== Specifications ==
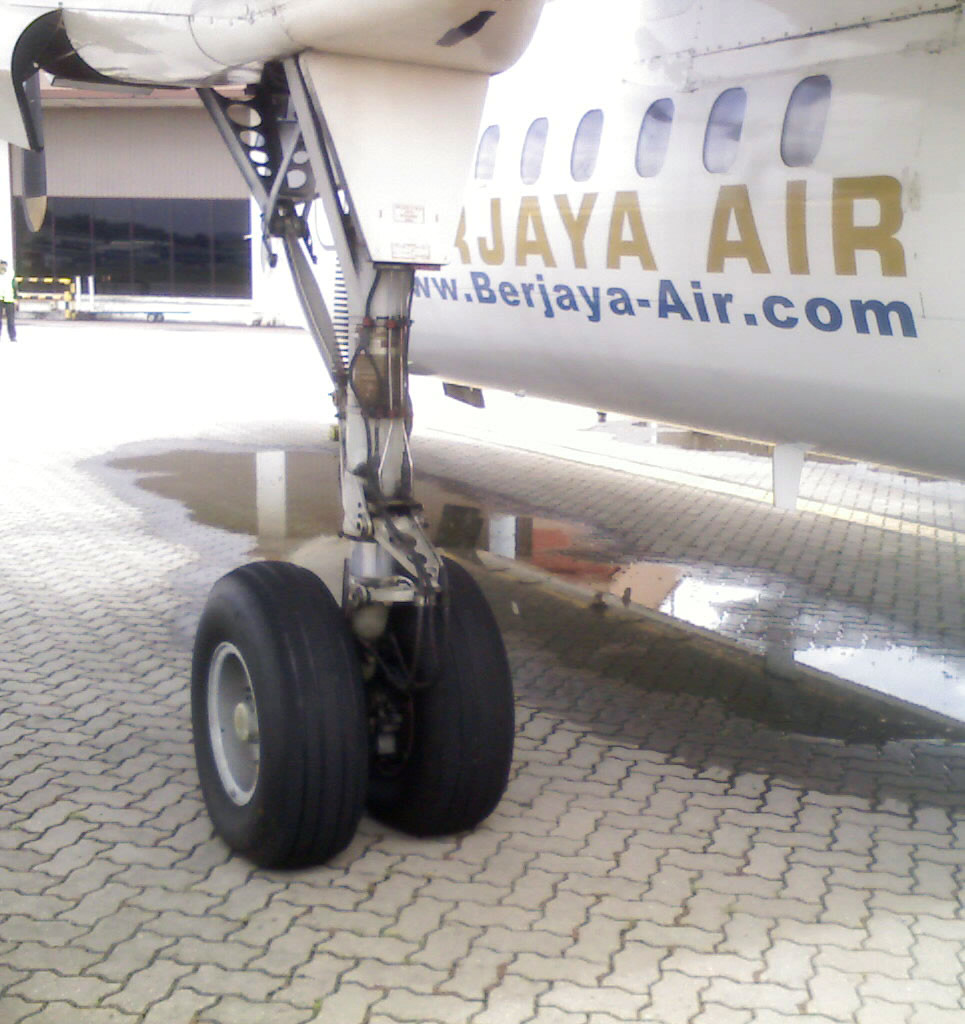
Undercarriage of a Berjaya Air Dash 7

Data from Jane's All The World's Aircraft 1982–83

General characteristics

- Crew: 2
- Capacity: 50–54 passengers
- Length: 80 ft 7.75 in (24.5809 m)
- Wingspan: 93 ft 0 in (28.35 m)
- Height: 26 ft 2 in (7.98 m)
- Wing area: 860 sq ft (80 m^{2})
- Airfoil: root: NACA 63A418 mod; tip: NACA 63A415 mod
- Empty weight: 27,690 lb (12,560 kg)
- Max takeoff weight: 44,000 lb (19,958 kg)
- Powerplant: 4 × Pratt & Whitney Canada PT6A-50 turboprop engines, 1,120 shp (840 kW) each

Performance

- Maximum speed: 231 kn (266 mph, 428 km/h)
- Range: 690 nmi (790 mi, 1,280 km) with 50 passengers and baggage
- Service ceiling: 21,000 ft (6,400 m) 25,000 ft (7,620 m) without passengers
- Rate of climb: 1,120 ft/min (5.7 m/s) en-route, flaps and landing gear up
- Take-off field length: 2,260 ft (689 m)
- Landing field length: 1,950 ft (594 m)

== See also ==
Related development

- de Havilland Canada DHC-6 Twin Otter
- de Havilland Canada DHC-8 Dash 8

Aircraft of comparable role, configuration, and era

- Antonov An-24
- ATR 42
- Convair 540/580/600/640
- Dornier 328
- Fokker F27
- Hawker Siddeley HS 748
- Saab 340

Related lists

- List of civil aircraft
- List of STOL aircraft
