= London City Airways =

Regional airline of the United Kingdom (1986–1990)

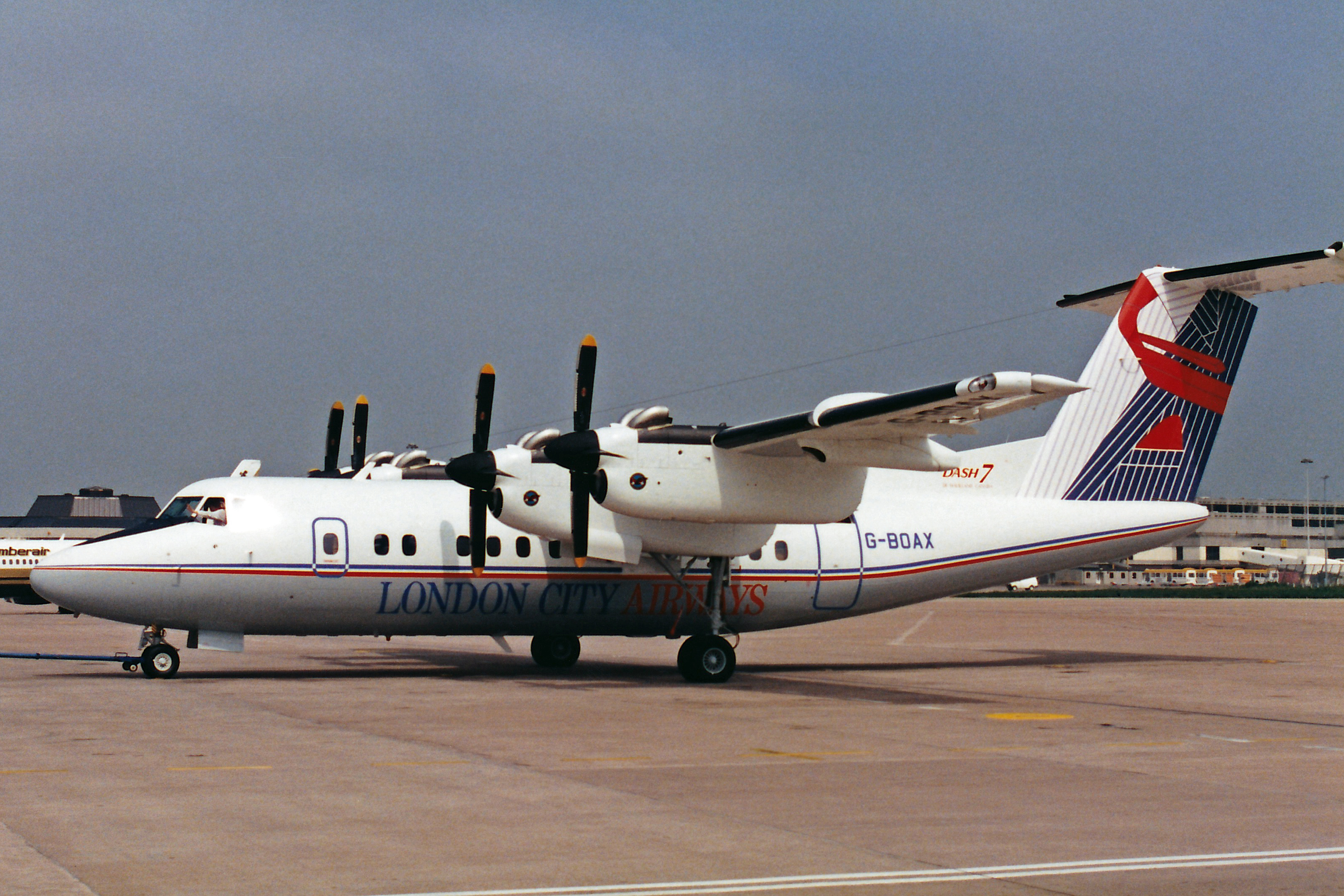
- de Havilland Canada Dash 7
IATA	ICAO	Call sign
—	LCY	STOL
- Founded: 1986 (as Eurocity Express)
- Commenced operations: 28 October 1987
- Ceased operations: 1 September 1990 (merged into British Midland Airways)
- Operating bases: London City Airport
- Frequent-flyer program: BMI Diamond Club
- Parent company: British Midland Airways

London City Airways was an airline in the United Kingdom which was founded in 1986 by British Midland Airways to operate from London City Airport.

== History ==
The airline was incorporated in 1986 as Eurocity Express Ltd. as a British Midland Airways fully-owned subsidiary. Operations began in the autumn of 1987 from London City Airport to Amsterdam, Brussels and Paris using two de Havilland Canada Dash 7. Together with Brymon Airways, with whom it competed directly on the Paris route, the airline was responsible for launching operations from the newly constructed airport. A summer schedule to Jersey and weekend ad hoc charters were added later on.

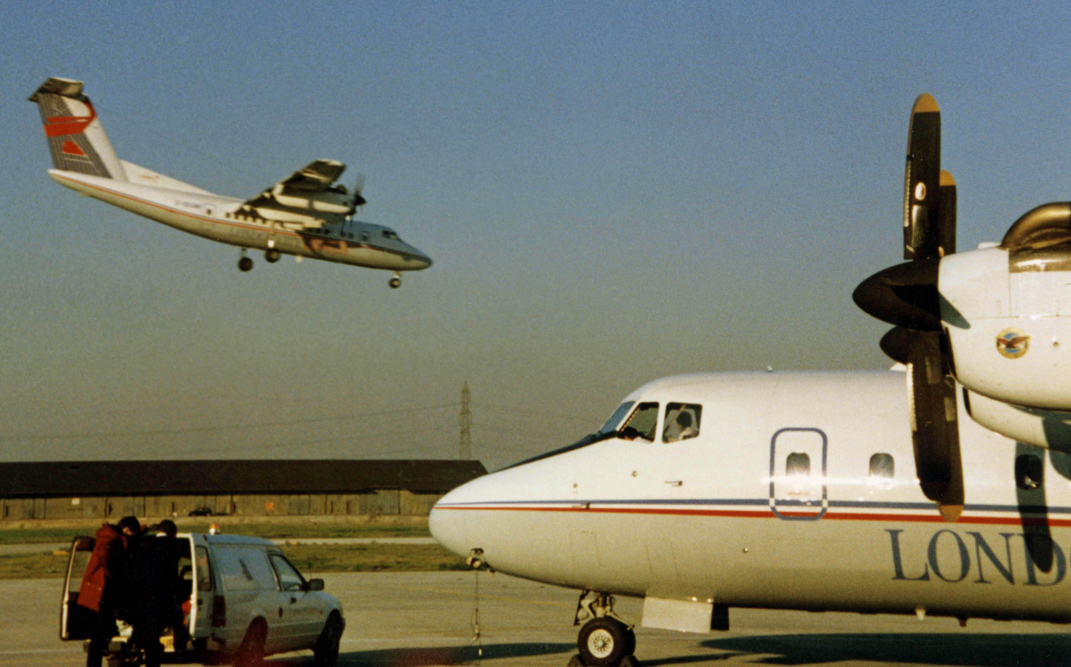
de Havilland Canada Dash 7 at London City airport on 31 October 1988

In early 1988, the airline was renamed London City Airways Ltd. so as to more closely identify with its base. Orders were placed for three de Havilland Canada Dash 7, the final airframes of this type that were produced. The two original aircraft were sold when the third aircraft arrived, but later in 1988, a further Dash 7 G-BOAZ was purchased from Maersk Air to increase the fleet to four aircraft.

The airline was disestablished in 1990 following sustained financial losses and all assets merged into parent airline British Midland Airways.

== See also ==
- BA CityFlyer
- Odyssey Airlines
- List of defunct airlines of the United Kingdom
