= Roger Sainsbury (engineer) =

British civil engineer (born 1940)

Roger Norman Sainsbury
- Born: Hitchin, Hertfordshire
- Education: Keble College, Oxford
- Engineering career
- Discipline: Civil,
- Institutions: Institution of Civil Engineers (president)
- Projects: Natwest Tower, London City Airport extension

Roger Sainsbury (born 11 June 1940) is a British civil engineer. He spent much of his career with the construction contractor Mowlem, including work on the Natwest Tower. He rose to become a director of the firm and was responsible for Mowlem’s participation in the creation of the Manchester Metro and for the company’s role as creator and developer of London City Airport. Sainsbury left Mowlem in December 1995 and subsequently devoted much time to the Institution of Civil Engineers (ICE), being president for the 1998-9 session. Sainsbury resigned his membership of the Institute in 2001, becoming the first president to take such a step, "because the way in which its affairs are conducted is, in my view, not compatible with its position of trust to its membership." From March 2023, Roger has been a founder of the Deprived Pensioners Association, established to fight for justice for Pension Protection Fund (PPF) members lacking fair indexation.

== Early life and career ==
Roger Sainsbury was born in Hitchin in Hertfordshire. From 1959 to 1962 he read engineering at Keble College, Oxford, and then began his career as a designer at consultants Rendel, Palmer and Tritton.

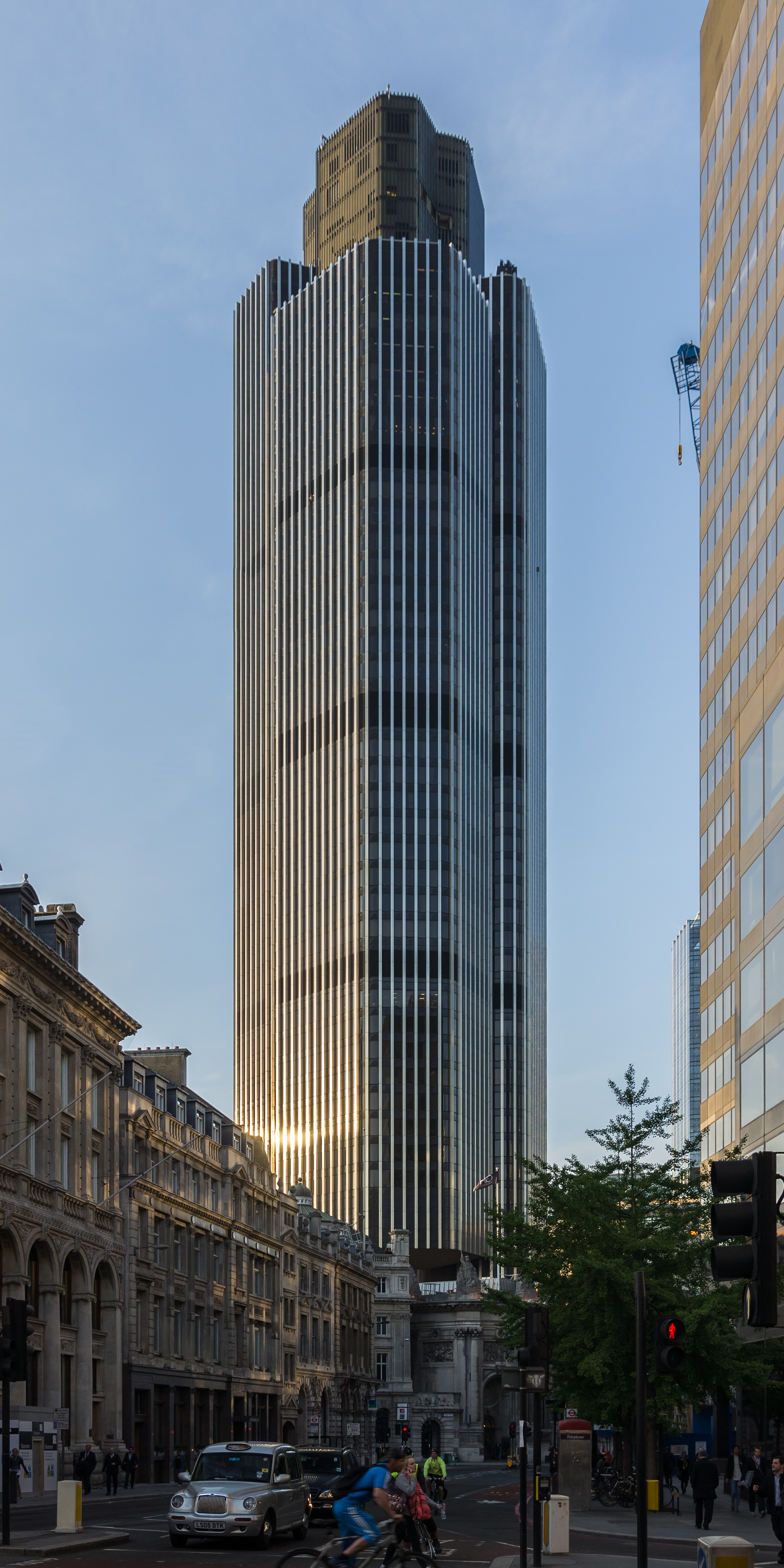
The Natwest Tower (2011 photograph)

Sainsbury also worked as project engineer and later as project director on the construction of the Natwest Tower which was completed in 1980. For this project he devised a 36m-high temporary propping system that automatically adjusted itself to compensate for changing compression and thermal strains. Sainsbury was subsequently promoted to director of Mowlem. With a colleague he was named joint winner of the 1979 Construction News Man of the Year award for his work on the tower.

During this time the company was working on a renovation of a London town house. Sainsbury received a legal letter from a neighbouring property complaining about noise disturbance that ended: "In considering your response, we think you should be aware that our client is British Petroleum and that this house is the chairman's London residence. We mean what we say". Sainsbury's reply ended "In considering your response, we think you should be aware that our client is HRH The Crown Prince of Saudi Arabia". The matter was dropped by British Petroleum.

In 1982 Sainsbury was promoted to become a director of the main board of Mowlem. He had responsibility for approving the company's bids for the construction of the Queen Elizabeth II Bridge at the Dartford Crossing (opened 1991) and the Manchester Metrolink (opened 1992). He was involved in the decision-making process to increase the length of the runway at London City Airport to allow its use by the British Aerospace 146 regional jet; the project, which Mowlem bid for and won, was completed in 1992. Sainsbury left the company in 1995 and subsequently became more involved in the Institution of Civil Engineers (ICE).

== Institution of Civil Engineers ==
Sainsbury campaigned for new safety standards for linkways following the September 1994 Prins Filip ferry disaster in which a collapse killed six people at the Port of Ramsgate. He joined former ICE president David Green in a campaign for funding from the government that was still ongoing in 2000. He also served as a judge for the Construction News Quality in Construction Awards. Sainsbury was chairman of the ICE's commercial arm, Thomas Telford (Holdings), in 1995 and supported the sale of the magazine publishing business.

Sainsbury was elected president of the ICE for the November 1998 to November 1999 session. He was elected the same year as the institution brought in a new director-general. Sainsbury stated that this focus would be on implementing the 200 recommendations of the previous presidential commission and to strengthen the local associations and communications with members. His official ICE portrait was painted by Christian Furr. Sainsbury undertook official ICE tours of West and South Asia in February and March 1999, which included visits to Manila, Delhi, Dhaka and Pakistan, and to Spain and Portugal in September and October.

Following his presidency, in April 2000 Sainsbury was present at an ICE Council meeting that discussed the amalgamation of the previous incorporated engineer class of membership with that of full members. He was against the move: "it takes away from the Institution and drives at the heart of the Institution". At the September 2000 full council debate on the issue, at which the decision was passed, he stated "I agree with the need to attract good quality people into the Institution. But the letters MICE [i.e. Member of the ICE] will no longer designate the professional standard of the holder. We have set aside the original intention of raising the standard of MICE".

In February 2001 Sainsbury became the first past president to resign his membership of the institution in its history. He stated: "I have resigned my membership of the Institution because the way in which its affairs are conducted is, in my view, not compatible with its position of trust to its membership; is not reconcilable with its position as custodian for the ethics of the profession; is such that I personally am no longer willing to be associated with it."

== The Deprived Pensioners Association ==
Roger has formed The Deprived Pensioners Association, which fights for justice for members of the Pension Protection Fund (PPF) who are receiving little or no indexation on their payments. This is bearing particularly hard on older members and is seen as a severe case of age discrimination. Roger is working hard, with other Mowlem directors, on this campaign as they feel a loyalty to their former Mowlem colleagues, many of whom are struggling financially in this time of high inflation. Funds are currently being raised through CrowdJustice to finance a legal challenge to this situation.

== Personal life ==
Sainsbury is married to Susan. In 2014 the couple presented a new college register - which is signed by all matriculating students - to his alma mater, the previous and first register having been filled after 145 years. Sainsbury has a reputation as being an intellectual of the contracting industry, being a fan of the theatre and also having toured Europe in search of rare orchids. Sainsbury himself stated that "I don't think I fit people's normal image of a contractor". He is active in his local church.

== Publications ==
=== Papers ===
- Oscillation of Piles in Marine Structures, CIRIA Report No 41. August 1972
- The Flow Induced Oscillation of Marine Structures. Institution of Civil Engineers. Paper No 7396. July 1971.
- National Westminster Tower. Some Aspects of Construction. Institution of Civil Engineers. Paper No 8592. August 1983
- London City Airport. Institution of Civil Engineers. Paper No 10007. Transport 1993
- Sustainability and Acceptability in Infrastructure Development. Institution of Civil Engineers. 1996. (Working party chairman and lead author.)
- Wonderful life. ICE Presidential Address. November 1998

=== Book ===
St Michael's Highgate: A History (2014) ISBN 978-0-9569421-4-2

Professional and academic associations
Preceded by Alan Cockshaw	President of the Institution of Civil Engineers; November 1998 – November 1999	Succeeded by George Fleming
