= Salix (disambiguation) =

Salix is a genus of deciduous trees and shrubs.

Salix may also refer to:

- Salix, Iowa, United States
- Salix, Pennsylvania, United States
- Salix, Conduit Head Road, a Modernist house in Cambridge, England
- Salix Pharmaceuticals, makers of gastroenterology products
- 8648 Salix, a main-belt asteroid
- Salix OS, a Slackware-based Linux distribution
- Salix Homes, a housing association based in Salford, England
- Salix Finance Ltd., which provides public sector funding for energy efficiency to support the energy policy of the United Kingdom
- Salix, a brand name for the medication furosemide

== People with the given name ==
- Salix Säydäş (1900–1954), Tatar composer and conductor
