= David Green (civil engineer) =

British civil engineer (born 1937)

- Born: London
- Engineering career
- Discipline: Civil
- Institutions: Institution of Civil Engineers (president); Royal Academy of Engineering (fellow)

David Frederick Green (born December 1937) is a British civil engineer, who served as president of the Institution of Civil Engineers from 1996–1997. He spent much of his career in Sheffield where he became director of operational services for the city council. In this role he spearheaded a reform of the city's direct labour operations, driving down costs and enabling it to operate on a competitive level with the private sector. As president from 1996 he sought more influence for the Institution of Civil Engineers over national policy. He was later chair of the Together Housing Group, a company providing social housing. Green was involved in the campaign for the introduction of new design standards for ship-to-shore walkways following the 1994 Prins Filip ferry walkway collapse that killed six people in Ramsgate.

== Early life and career ==
Green was born in London in 1937 but grew up in Sheffield. He was a member of the Yorkshire and Humber branch of the Institution of Civil Engineers and later became a fellow of that body and of the Royal Academy of Engineering. Green became director of operational services for Sheffield City Council. In this role he was responsible for turning around the performance of the council's in-house direct labour operations. He halved the workforce, drove down costs and increased productivity to create a more efficient organisation capable of competing for work on even terms with the private sector. He entered the private sector as a director of engineering services firm Mouchel and later became an independent consulting engineer.

Green served as president of the Institution of Civil Engineers (ICE) for the November 1996 to November 1997 session. His objectives were to improve the institution's lobbying position to press for action from government on tight margins, the impact of the early 1990s recession on the industry and for the quickening of the introduction of private finance initiative contracts. Green also wanted the institution to consider mergers with some of the 40 other professional bodies in the sector and to work to improve the profession's reputation with the public.

Green also served as chairman of the Association of Municipal Engineers and during his tenure urged public bodies to reduce congestion of the country's roads through greater provision of buses and more investment in road infrastructure. He asked for underperforming authorities to be "named and shamed". Green later headed the 60-member Joint Public/Private Sector Taskforce, an association of public and private sector organisations led by the ICE that aimed to build trust between the two sectors that had been damaged by the introduction of compulsory competitive tenders for public sector projects. To further this aim Green wrote and published a book entitled Advancing Best Value in the Built Environment: A Guide to Best Practice.

Green later became chairman of the Together Housing Group, a position he held until at least October 2013. This was a group of several housing associations and businesses managing social housing transferred to the private sector under Large Scale Voluntary Transfer. The group owned more than 37,000 housing units worth more than £1 billion. He is also a member of the board of Abbeydale Sports Club in Sheffield.

== Safety campaigning ==
Green campaigned for a new code of practice in the British Standards framework for the design of ship-to-shore walkways. This followed the September 1994 Prins Filip ferry disaster in which a walkway linking the ferry to the Port of Ramsgate had collapsed during passenger embarkation killing six people and seriously injuring seven others. A weld failure was the immediate cause of the collapse but investigations showed errors were made during design, construction, maintenance and inspection of the linkspan structure. Green lobbied the newly elected Labour government in summer 1997, requesting a meeting on the matter with deputy prime minister John Prescott. He eventually received an offer to meet with health and safety minister Angela Eagle in 1998 though this was postponed at least once. Despite the support of an April 1999 Construction Industry Research and Information Association report no progress had been made by 2000. Green was supported in his campaign by fellow former ICE President Roger Norman Sainsbury.

Professional and academic associations
Preceded by Tony Ridley	President of the Institution of Civil Engineers; March 1996 – November 1997	Succeeded by Alan Cockshaw
