= George Fleming (engineer) =

Scottish civil engineer

George Fleming FREng, FRSE
- Born: 16 August 1944 (age 81); Glasgow
- Education: Royal College of Science and Technology; Stanford University; University of Strathclyde
- Occupations: Civil Engineer, Farmer, Author
- Spouse: Irene MacDonald Fleming [m. 1966]
- Children: Duar Fleming, Campbell Fleming, Tracy Duncan
- Engineering career
- Discipline: Civil, environmental
- Institutions: Institution of Civil Engineers (Past president); Association of Environmental and Ecological Clerks of Works (Past chairman); Royal Academy of Engineering (fellow); Transport Research Foundation (Past fellow); American Society of Civil Engineers (fellow, now retired); Chartered Institution of Wastes Management (fellow); Royal Society of Edinburgh (fellow)
- Projects: Landfill technology and waste management, Computer simulation of floods, Dam and reservoir design

George Fleming FREng FRSE is a Scottish civil engineer specialising in environmental issues. Educated at the Royal College of Science and Technology, Stanford University and the University of Strathclyde he is a doctor of philosophy. His research started with studies of the hydrology of the River Clyde that expanded to a range of subjects including, flood risk, dredging, nuclear waste management, decommissioning of North Sea platforms and contaminated land. He has written reports on flooding for the Institution of Civil Engineers and the British government. Fleming was involved in the planning stages of the Glasgow Garden Festival of 1988 and established a way of reusing dredgings from the Clyde to provide topsoil for the event. He has served as a non-executive director of British Waterways, Port of Tyne boards and for WRAP, a government quango whose aim was to promote recycling and resource efficiency. He is founder and chairman of the EnviroCentre environmental consultancy, of which his son, Duar, is managing director.

== Early life and academic career ==
Born in Glasgow, Fleming grew up in a house in Knightswood, Glasgow near to the Forth and Clyde Canal. His childhood spent playing on the canal may have inspired his career as a water engineer. Fleming studied for a Bachelor of Science degree at the Royal College of Science and Technology, just as it was transitioning into the University of Strathclyde. He found that structural engineering was too straightforward and preferred to focus on what he considered the more complex, and then less well researched, challenges of hydrology and the environment. As an undergraduate in 1965 he researched the Flood Frequency of Scottish rivers and produced design curves that became a standard used in design.

Fleming also investigated the impact that droughts and floods have on soil erosion with a particular focus on the River Clyde. He was granted a Doctor of Philosophy (PhD) degree which was, unusually, split between Strathclyde and Stanford University in California. His PhD investigated the movements of water and sediment in the Clyde system using digital simulation software he helped pioneer at Stanford. He published a paper on the computer simulation of flows in the Clyde, a first ever. After this he returned to Strathclyde and became a professor of civil engineering. Fleming has authored or co-authored more than 200 academic publications and 9 books and also produced four video documentaries.

Fleming is a fellow of the Royal Society of Edinburgh, the Institution of Civil Engineers (ICE), the Royal Academy of Engineering, the Chartered Institution of Wastes Management, was a fellow of the American Society of Civil Engineers (ASCE). and was appointed President of the Smeatonian Society of Civil Engineers for 2023. He is also a Chartered Environmentalist. Fleming was elected president of the ICE for the November 1999 to November 2000 session. He co-authored a 2001 ICE report into the Autumn 2000 western Europe floods which recommended a 1 in 200 year flood depth standard, a doubling of expenditure on flood defences, the training of more river engineers and better investment in flood prediction. Fleming stated that at that time flood defence works were viewed as "a second class operation". He was later asked by deputy prime minister John Prescott to chair a commission into the effects of the flooding, which resulted in a report entitled "Learning to Live with Rivers". Fleming's commission recommended the establishment of a separate body for flooding, taking responsibilities from the Environment Agency which had to deal with the conflicting interests of flood protection, habitat protection and management of development. He later reiterated the recommendations to Prime Minister Gordon Brown. The recommendation of raising the flood design to 1 in 200 year was not implemented.

Fleming's singular achievement as president was to remove the barrier preventing Technician Engineers to proceed to Chartered Civil Engineer status.

On 23 May 2001 Fleming was elected a fellow of the Transport Research Foundation at which point he was deputy dean of engineering at the University of Strathclyde. Fleming co- founded and served as chairman of the charity Engineers Against Poverty in 2000 and later the Association of Environmental and Ecological Clerks of Works from its formation until January 2018.

== Career in industry ==
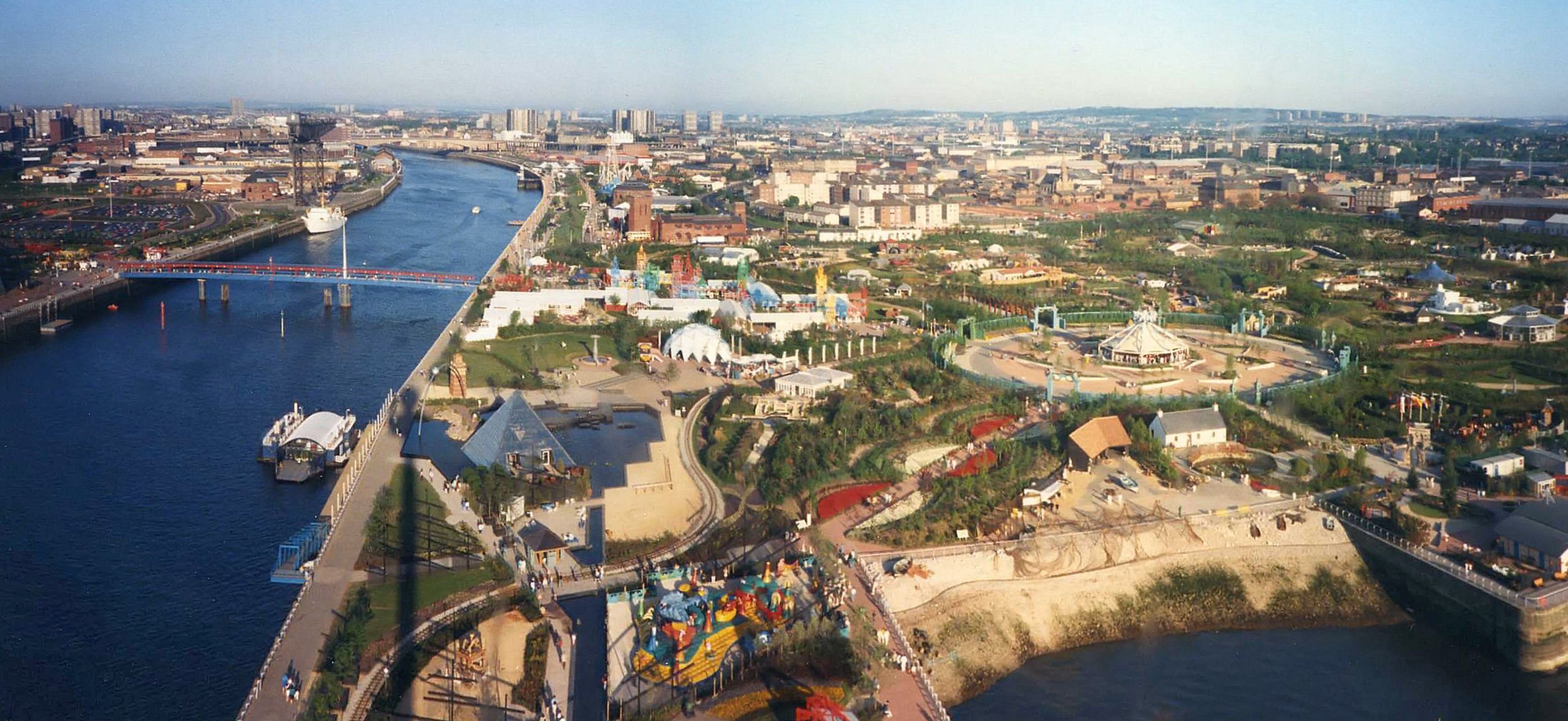
Glasgow Garden Festival

Fleming's first consultancy was for Binnie and Partners, London, where he contributed to the design of Strathclyde Loch near Hamilton. This involved separating the loch from the Clyde. Fleming was involved in the planning of the Glasgow Garden Festival and the programme of regeneration that followed it. His academic work had shown that dredgings from the River Clyde contained valuable nutrients washed down from upstream agricultural land and, once treated to remove heavy metals, could be re-used as opposed to being discarded as previous. Fleming generated topsoil for the garden festival this way and subsequently licensed the technology used to a company that sold the material under the brand name ClydeSoil. Fleming also made bricks from the material and investigated whether the technology could be applied to rivers in Hong Kong and Egypt. Fleming was involved in a project to assess the sedimentation in the Aswan Dam for the Egyptian government. He also looked at the possibility of making soil from other waste materials such as quarry dust, forestry waste, paper mill sludge, fish farming by-products and sewage sludge.

While Vice President of Hydrocomp (between 1968 and 1977), a commercial spinout from Stanford University, Fleming was involved in projects simulating river basin flooding in The Chicago River, The Colorado and in the Santa Ynez river in California at Santa Barbara. He was the first hydrologist using Hydrocomp software to simulate a "real time" flood forecast of the Santa Ynez used to operate the reservoirs to reduce the magnitude of the flood, as it occurred.

Fleming's consultancy experience included projects as letterhead consultant to Watson-Hawksley on the main drainage of Mumbai (formerly Bombay), the Eldoret Dam in Kenya, Labuan Dam in Labuan and dams in Brunei. He also worked on the Akosombo Dam and Tema Power Station in Ghana, designing the operational plan for operation under low head conditions for the ODA in 1988. As consultant to the UN/ FAO, he worked extensively in land management in Morocco to coastal erosion and introduced computer modelling in hydrology to the UN. During an extended period he acted as Visiting Professor to the Facoltà di Agraria at Padova University, establishing computer simulation of flow and snow melt prediction models in the Italian Alps during 1982–1987. He also became a visiting professor at Cal Poly State University, California, on the research & design of landfill sites.

Fleming served as a member of the Overseas Projects Board, Department of Trade & Industry between 1991-1995 and served as member of the Scottish Exports Forum in 1995 and on the Scottish Government's advisory group on HydroNation.

At around the time of the festival Fleming established the Landlab, a research unit that studies the self-renewing properties of soil. In 1995 he founded the EnviroCentre environmental consultancy, specialising in environmental matters as he perceived that there was a shortage of companies in that field. It was partially funded by the Glasgow Development Agency, Clydeport and Patersons of Greenoakhill. The company, of which Fleming is currently the chairman, now works across many sectors including energy, harbours, roads, housing, nuclear waste, ecology, noise, decommissioning concrete gravity platforms, and coastal erosion of golf courses including Trump Aberdeen, North Berwick, Royal Aberdeen and Muirfield. Fleming has been Peer Review Consultant on the Low Level Waste Rebository (LLWR) at Drigg since 2008 and on the decommissioning of the Dunlin Alpha oil platform in the North Sea.

== Personal life ==
Fleming has lived in Scotland for most of his life. He farms land on the Isle of Seil in Argyll, raising sheep and cattle. His youngest son, Duar Fleming is managing director of EnviroCentre Ltd. His eldest son, Campbell Fleming, formerly of EnviroCentre Ltd, is now retired and working freelance. His daughter Tracy is an IT specialist. He and his wife Irene have five grandchildren. Fleming has curated an exhibition of the history of civil engineering in Scotland.

== Author ==
Fleming was an author of a number of books, chapters and as listed in the references, reports during his academic career.

Professional and academic associations
| Preceded by Roger Norman Sainsbury | President of the Institution of Civil Engineers; November 1999 – November 2000 | Succeeded by Sir Joseph Dwyer |
