= Joseph Dwyer (engineer) =

British civil engineer and businessman (1939–2021)

Joe Dwyer
- Born: 20 June 1939; Liverpool, England
- Died: 16 October 2021 (aged 82)
- Engineering career
- Discipline: Civil
- Institutions: Institution of Civil Engineers (president); Chartered Institute of Building (president)
- Projects: Channel Tunnel, Lime Street station refurbishment, Liverpool Arena

Sir Joseph Anthony Dwyer (20 June 1939 – 16 October 2021) was a British civil engineer and businessman. He joined George Wimpey in 1955 and spent 44 years with the firm, becoming chief executive officer and chairman.

Dwyer was responsible for repositioning Wimpey as a housebuilder by swapping its contracting arm for Tarmac's housing division. Wimpey subsequently saw a 30-fold increase in pre-tax profits. Dwyer served as chairman of the British part of TransManche Link, which built the Channel Tunnel and, after his 1999 retirement from Wimpey, served as president of the Institution of Civil Engineers.

In the early 2000s he was chairman of the Liverpool Vision urban regeneration company and oversaw £2 billion of capital investment in regeneration projects including refurbishments of Lime Street station and King's Dock and construction of Liverpool Arena. Dwyer was appointed a deputy lieutenant of Merseyside in 2008 and a non-executive director of Crossrail in the same year.

== Career with Wimpey ==
Joeseph Dwyer was born in Liverpool in 1939. He joined the construction firm of George Wimpey in 1955 at the age of 16. Dwyer worked initially as a junior engineer on a site in Liverpool and was responsible for drawing up work schedules. With Wimpey Dwyer worked on the refurbishment of the Victorian Cammell Laird shipyards in Birkenhead. Whilst working on this project he enrolled onto a part-time course at what is now Liverpool John Moores University, studying three nights a week for five years.

During the 1980s Dwyer survived a helicopter accident whilst travelling to one of the firm's open-cast coal mining operations. For a time he was feared dead as his accident was confused with another on the same day that killed a family travelling to Alton Towers. In the early 1990s Dwyer was appointed head of the British Contractors Group, part of TransManche Link - the Anglo-French consortium formed to build the Channel Tunnel. He clashed occasionally with Alastair Morton, chairman of client Eurotunnel, but later denied there was any animosity between the two.

Dwyer served as chairman and chief executive officer of Wimpey. He became convinced that contracting was a "mug's game" with high risk and low reward and sought to reposition the firm as a more profitable housebuilder. Dwyer was seen as the mastermind behind Wimpey's £700 million asset swap with Tarmac: Tarmac received Wimpey's construction and materials operations in exchange for its housebuilding division. Wimpey subsequently became a major housebuilding firm and saw pre-tax profits grow from £15 million to £451 million. Dwyer left Wimpey in 1999; the same year that Tarmac demerged its construction operations to form Carillion.

== Later career ==
After his departure from Wimpey Dwyer was appointed chairman of the Liverpool Vision urban regeneration company. This company was established to provide an economic stimulus for the regeneration of the city which had declined in population from one million people to around 400,000 and gained a reputation for high unemployment and crime rates. Dwyer was responsible for bringing Tesco CEO Terry Leahy onto the board and led a £2 billion programme of capital investment. Under his leadership Liverpool Vision refurbished Lime Street station, regenerated King's Dock and established a training scheme to accommodate 2,000 apprentices a year. Dwyer was responsible for the cancellation of the Fourth Grace landmark building scheme, designed by Will Alsop, on cost grounds. This decision led to the resignation of Labour politician Joe Anderson from the board of Liverpool Vision. Dwyer was also responsible for the decision not to proceed with the construction of a new stadium for Everton Football Club at King's Dock. Dwyer believed the stadium should have been owned and operated by the public sector and also had concerns that Everton could not raise the necessary capital investment to proceed with the scheme. He instead proceeded with a project to construct the Liverpool Arena on the site as a venue for smaller sporting and musical events. Dwyer was made a Knight Bachelor in the 2001 Birthday Honours for his services to Liverpool Vision.

Dwyer was also involved in several professional societies and served as president of the Chartered Institute of Building. In 1997 he was elected a Fellow of the Royal Academy of Engineering (FEng, later FREng) and in 1998 served as president of the Chartered Institute of Building. In 1999 he was appointed to an Institution of Civil Engineers (ICE) working party to manage the integration of the Board of Incorporated & Engineering Technicians (BIET) into the ICE. This was a difficult task as although members of the BIET did not want full chartered engineer status they complained that the associate and technician membership grades had little influence within the institution. Dwyer was appointed president of the ICE for the November 2000 – November 2001 session, he was the first president to receive a knighthood during their term of office.

On 23 July 2008, Dwyer was appointed a non-executive director of Cross London Rail Links, the company set up to manage the construction of Crossrail in the capital. In the same year he was appointed Deputy lieutenant of Merseyside.

He died on 16 October 2021, at the age of 82.

Professional and academic associations
Preceded by George Fleming	President of the Institution of Civil Engineers; November 2000 – November 2001	Succeeded by Mark Whitby
