= Salix Homes =

Housing association

Salix Homes Ltd.
- Company type: charitable community benefit society
- Industry: Council housing (until 2015); Social housing; Affordable housing
- Founded: July 1, 2007; 18 years ago
- Headquarters: Diamond House, 2 Peel Cross Road, Salford, England
- Area served: Salford and Trafford
- Key people: Sue Sutton (CEO)
- Subsidiaries: Salix Living Ltd.; Salix Homes Development Ltd.
- Website: www.salixhomes.co.uk

Salix Homes is a housing association, affordable housing provider and former council housing management company in the City of Salford, Greater Manchester. As of April 2023 it owns and manages 7,760 homes.

== History ==
In September 2002, Salford City Council set up 'New Prospect', one of the first arms-length management organisations (ALMOs) in the country, to manage its 29,000 council properties on its behalf. It failed to meet regulatory standards, which left Salford unable to access Decent Homes funding in 2002 or 2004. New Prospect was gradually dismantled. The council also invited tenants for consultation from 2004, and found that they were strongly in support of transferring management of housing to a new organisation.

In 2007, Salix Homes was set up as a new ALMO to take over the management of 10,500 of the properties from New Prospect, and to implement the Manchester and Salford Housing Market Renewal Initiative in Central Salford. The rest of the council's housing units were directly transferred in ownership to the City West Housing Trust housing association in October 2008. The council began planning for a third structure, a Pendleton PFI scheme which eventually would take over some of its most "challenging" housing for regeneration and demolition, but this housing would continue to be managed by Salix until the scheme was finalised. Subsequently, some of the council's housing stock was transferred to the management of Pendleton Together. As of 2013 Salix managed 10,500 homes.

Due to financial concerns and continuing inability to meet the Decent Homes Standard, the council passed a decision in 2012 to explore alternatives to self-financing for its remaining council houses, all now managed by Salix. Salix committed to making sure all properties would comply with the standard by 2020 if it took ownership, and a vote was put to council residents. In order for the transfer to take place, the government agreed to write off £65 million of the council's debt, which would enable Salix to access funding.

On 24 March 2015, the council transferred its remaining housing stock, about 8,300 units, into Salix's ownership, thereby making Salix into a stand-alone housing association.

In 2019 the council was once again allowed to directly provide housing. Some of its building projects for new council housing are now carried out by Salix.

== Housing ==
=== Area served ===
Salix originally provided housing in Central Salford, which includes Claremont, Weaste, Seedley, Kersal, Charlestown, Broughton, Ordsall, Langworthy, Islington and Pendleton. Now it operates in a larger area of Salford and Trafford. It first bought properties in Swinton and Little Hulton in 2016. It also has a subsidiary, Salix Living, which leases private properties to social tenants in Trafford.

=== Housing types ===
Housing managed by Salix is a mixture of flats and single-family houses. As of September 2024, it owns 20 residential tower blocks in Salford. As well as houses for social rent, Salix has provided new-build council houses for the city since 2019, including in Seedley. It also builds affordable housing for sale. Salix sells affordable housing under the name Willo Homes through Help to Buy, under the Shared Ownership and Rent to Buy schemes, and via direct market sales.

=== Renovation and building ===
As part of its stock transfer from the council it signed up to improvements in the quality of its existing housing. It has also built new housing for social, affordable and council rental, and for affordable and shared ownership. On Beechfarm Estate in Swinton, demolition began in 2017 of 140 houses for social rent, which were replaced with 120 social rent houses and an additional 40 for sale by 2021. Albion Towers, a 16-storey block, was given a "facelift" and a new heating system in 2018. Fitzwarren Court, a 23-storey block in Pendleton originally due to be demolished, was refurbished by Salix in 2021 along with nearby Rosehill Close, after extra funding was secured in 2016.

In 2023 Salix made a £120 million refinancing deal to pay for renovations and new building. In 2023 it announced a £10 million renovation, insulation and ground source heating refit plan for the 14-storey Greyfriar Court and Whitefriar Court in the Greengate area. In 2024 it finished the Greenhaus apartment building in the Chapel Street area and began the Willowhaus development in the Chapel Street area, both passive house developments built in partnership with the regeneration company English Cities Fund.

== Criticism ==
In 2013, Salix was criticised for failing to take action to prevent the risk of fire in Whitebeam Court, a tower block in Pendleton.

In 2022, Salix was one of eight housing associations which sought to limit residents' ability to pursue claims via solicitors for homes that are unfit for habitation due to disrepair.

== Cooperation with police ==
In 2013 Salix Homes signed up to a new county-wide initiative in cooperation with Greater Manchester Police (GMP) which involved the sharing of intelligence. According to GMP, it would lead to a more effective use of resources to reduce crime and anti-social behaviour, protect vulnerable people, and support victims of crime in the City of Salford.
