= Alan Cockshaw =

Civil engineer

Sir Alan Cockshaw FREng
- Born: 14 July 1937; Manchester, England
- Occupation: Civil engineer
- Organizations: Fairclough Civil Engineering; AMEC
- Known for: President of the Institution of Civil Engineers

Sir Alan Cockshaw FREng (born 14 July 1937) is an English civil engineer. Born in Manchester, he became the chief executive of Fairclough Civil Engineering in 1978 and, when this merged with the William Press Group to form AMEC in 1982, he became the chief executive (1984–88) and then chairman (1988-97). He was knighted in 1992. He became a fellow of the Royal Academy of Engineering in 1986 and was president of the Institution of Civil Engineers from 1997 to 1998. He is a member of the South Tees Development Corporation board.

Professional and academic associations
Preceded by David Green	President of the Institution of Civil Engineers; November 1997– November 1998	Succeeded by Roger Norman Sainsbury
