= London City Airport =

Airport in London, England

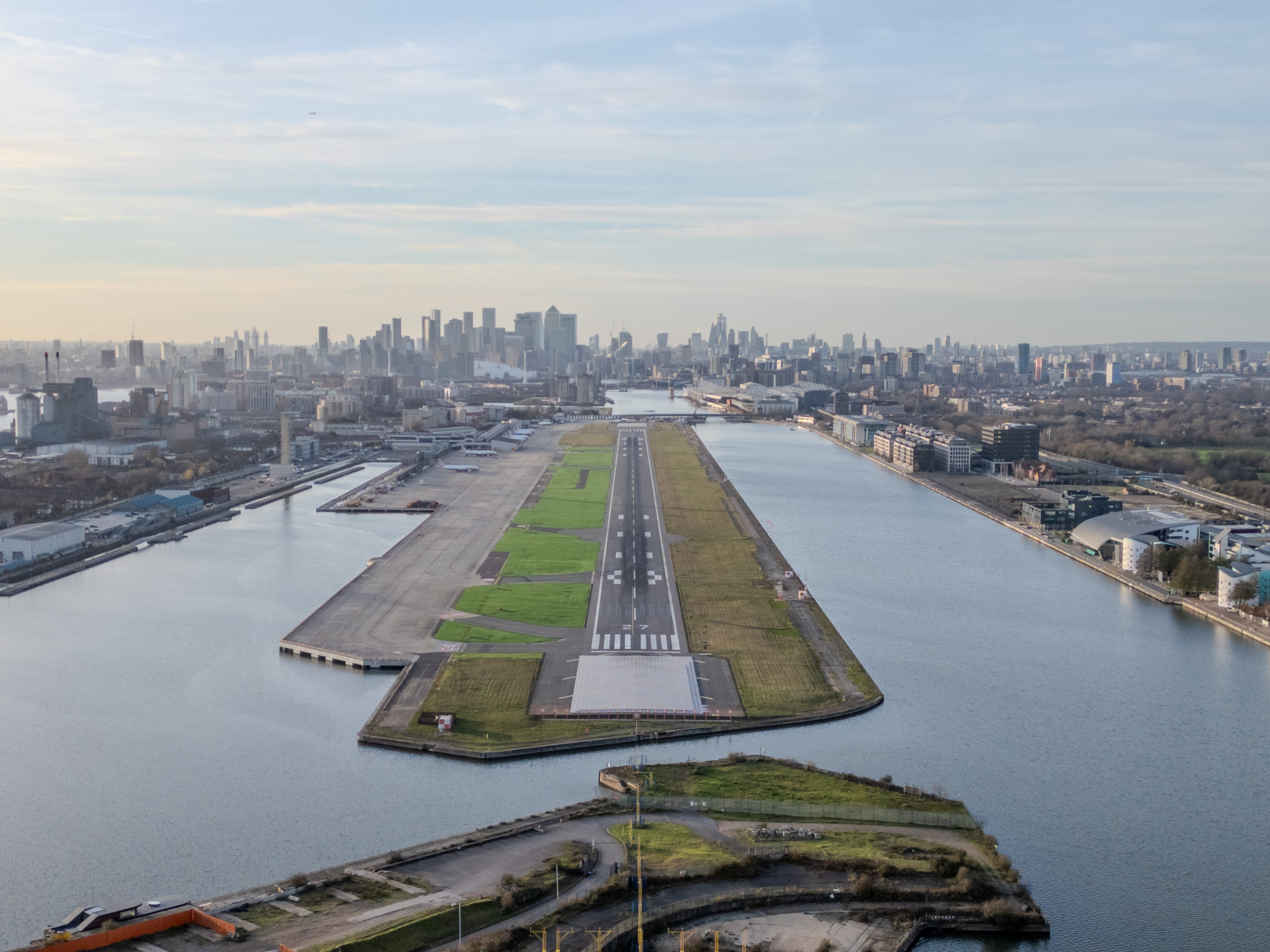
- IATA: LCY; ICAO: EGLC

Summary
- Airport type: Public
- Owner/Operator: London City Airport Limited
- Serves: London
- Location: Royal Docks, London, England
- Opened: 26 October 1987; 39 years ago
- Operating base for: BA CityFlyer
- Elevation AMSL: 19 ft (5.8 m)
- Coordinates: 51°30′19″N 000°03′19″E
- Website: londoncityairport.com

Map
- Location within Greater London LCY/EGLC (England)

Runways
Direction	Length		Surface
Direction	m	ft	Surface
09/27	1,508	4,948	Asphalt

Statistics (2022)
- Passengers: 3,009,313
- Passenger change 2021–22: ▲318%
- Aircraft movements: 44,731
- Movements change 2021–22: ▲246%
- Sources: UK AIP at NATS WAD; Statistics from the Civil Aviation Authority

London City Airport (IATA: LCY, ICAO: EGLC) is an international airport in London, England. It is located in the Royal Docks, about 6 miles (10 km) east of the City of London and 3 miles (5 km) east of Canary Wharf. These are the two centres of London's financial industry, which is a major user of the airport. The airport was developed by the engineering company Mowlem between 1986 and 1987. The airport is owned and operated by London City Airport Limited.

London City Airport has a single 1,508-metre-long (4,948 ft) runway, and a CAA Public Use Aerodrome Licence (Number P728) that allows flights for the public transport of passengers; this licence also allows training flights, but only for the purpose of training pilots to operate at this specific airport. Only multi-engine, fixed-wing aircraft up to Embraer E195-E2, Airbus A220 and A318 size, with special aircrew and aircraft-certification to fly 5.5° approaches, strict noise limitations and further restrictions are allowed to conduct operations at London City Airport. As of 2020, the airport is about 60 hectares (150 acres) in size.

London City had 5.1 and 3.73 million passenger movements in 2019 and 2025, respectively. It is the fifth-busiest airport by passengers and aircraft movements serving the London area—after Heathrow, Gatwick, Stansted and Luton—and was the 15th-busiest in the UK in 2025.

== History ==
=== Proposal and construction ===
The airport was first proposed in 1981 by Reg Ward, who was chief executive of the newly formed London Docklands Development Corporation (LDDC) that was responsible for the regeneration of the area. He in turn discussed the proposal with chairman of John Mowlem & Co, Philip Beck, and the idea of an airport for Docklands was born. By November of that year Mowlem and Bill Bryce of Brymon Airways had submitted an outline proposal to the LDDC for a Docklands STOLport city centre gateway.

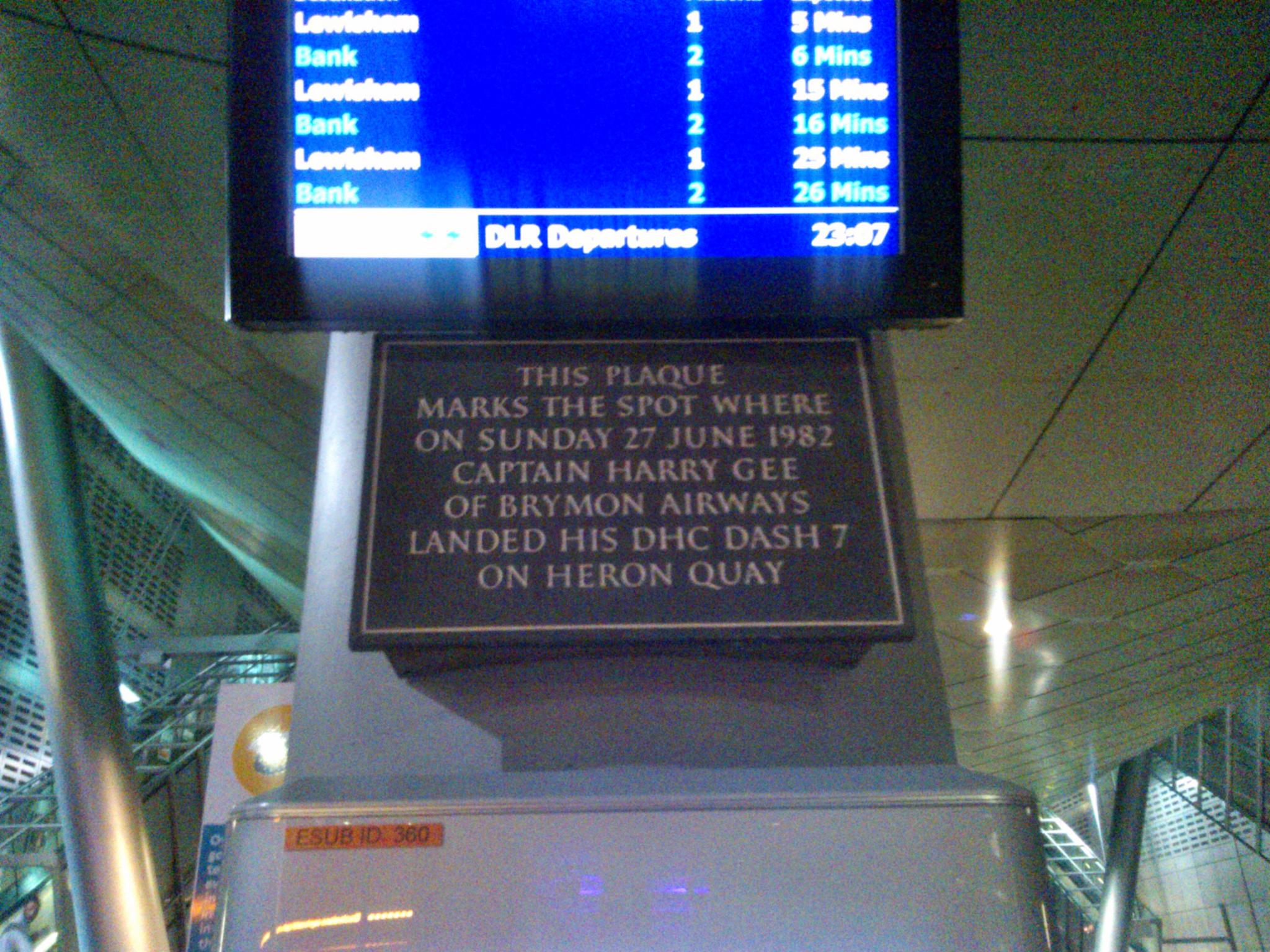
A plaque at Heron Quays DLR station commemorates the 1982 landing on Heron Quay by Captain Harry Gee.

On 27 June 1982, Brymon's Captain Harry Gee landed a de Havilland Canada Dash 7 turboprop aircraft on Heron Quays, in the nearby West India Docks, in order to demonstrate the feasibility of the STOLport project. Later that year the LDDC published a feasibility study, an opinion poll amongst local residents showed a majority in favour of the development of the airport, and Mowlem submitted an application for planning permission.

A 63-day planning inquiry started on 6 June 1983. By the middle of the following year, Nicholas Ridley the Secretary of State for Transport had indicated that he was "disposed to agree the application", but asked for further details. The Greater London Council brought an action in the High Court of Justice to reopen the inquiry. After the High Court dismissed the action in March 1985, outline planning permission was granted in May of that year, followed by the grant of detailed planning permission in early 1986. The airport site had an initial footprint of 37 hectares (92 acres) in area.

Construction began on the site shortly after permission was granted, with Charles, Prince of Wales laying the foundation stone of the terminal building, designed by R Seifert and Partners, on 2 May 1986. The first aircraft landed on 31 May 1987.

=== Opening and runway extension ===
The first commercial services began operating from the airport on 26 October 1987. Queen Elizabeth II officially opened London City Airport in November of the same year.

In 1988 – the first full year of operation – the airport handled 133,000 passengers. The earliest scheduled flights were operated to and from Plymouth, Paris, Amsterdam and Rotterdam. With a runway of only 1,080 m (3,543 ft) in length, and a slope of the glidepath of 7.5° (for noise abatement reasons), the airport could only be used by a very limited number of aircraft types, principally 50-seat de Havilland Canada Dash 7 and 19-seat Dornier 228 turboprops. In 1989, the airport submitted a planning application to extend the runway, allowing the use of a larger number of aircraft types.

In 1990, the airport handled 230,000 passengers, but the figures fell drastically after the Gulf War and did not recover until 1993, when 245,000 passengers were carried. By this time the extended runway had been approved, opening on 5 March 1992. At the same time the glide path was reduced to 5.5°, still steep for a European airport (the slope of an airport glide path is normally 3.0°), but sufficient to allow a larger range of aircraft, including the British Aerospace 146 and Airbus A318, to serve the airport.

By 1995, passenger numbers reached 500,000 and Mowlem sold the airport to Irish businessman Dermot Desmond. Five years later passenger numbers had climbed to 1.58 million, and over 30,000 flights were operated. In 2002, a jet centre catering to corporate aviation was opened, as well as additional aircraft stands at the western end of the apron. In 2003, a new ground holding point was established at the eastern end of the runway, enabling aircraft awaiting takeoff to hold there whilst other aircraft landed.

=== Further expansion ===
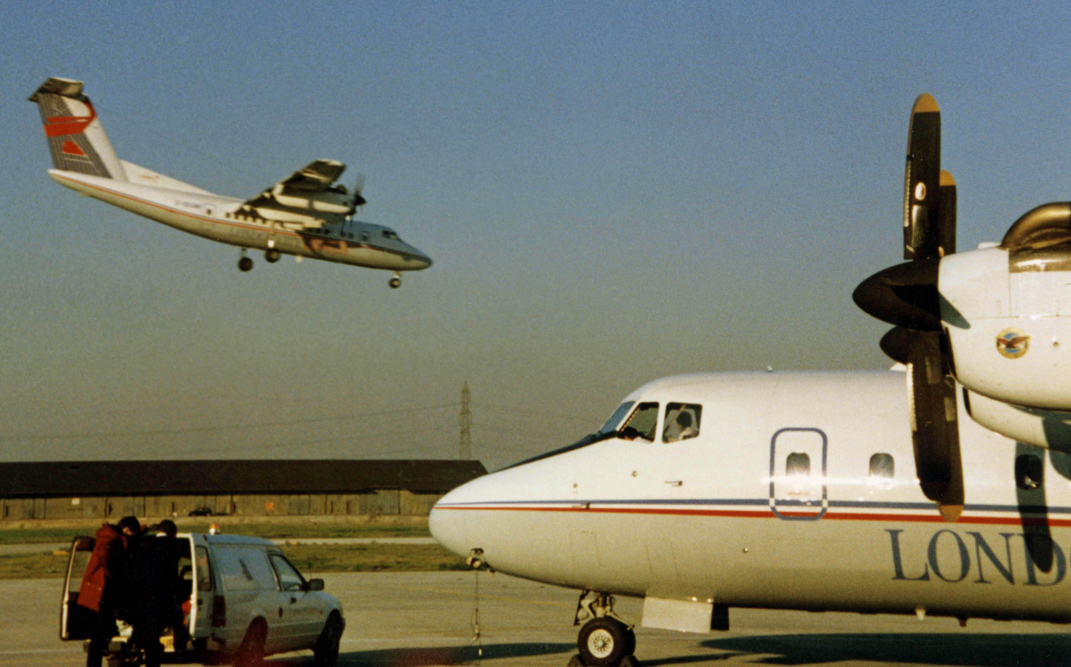
A de Havilland Canada Dash 7 of London City Airways making its steep approach to LCY from the west as another of the airline's DHC-7s prepares to depart to Amsterdam (1988)

On 2 December 2005, London City Airport DLR station opened on a branch of the Docklands Light Railway, providing rail access to the airport for the first time, and providing fast rail links to Canary Wharf and the City of London. By 2006, more than 2.3 million passengers used London City Airport.

In October 2006, the airport was purchased from Dermot Desmond by a consortium comprising insurer AIG Financial Products and Global Infrastructure Partners (GIP). In the final quarter of 2008, GIP increased its stake in the airport to 75%, the remaining 25% belonging to Highstar Capital.

London City Airport was granted planning permission to construct an extended apron with four additional aircraft parking stands and four new gates to the east of the terminal in 2001; they became operational on 30 May 2008. They are carried on piles above the water of the King George V Dock.

British Airways commenced the first scheduled transatlantic flights from the airport in September 2009, with a twice a day service to New York City's John F. Kennedy International Airport via Shannon using a specially configured Airbus A318 aircraft. The A318 is the smallest airliner to operate transatlantic services since BA's corporate predecessor, BOAC, began transatlantic jet flights on 4 October 1958, with the de Havilland Comet 4.

The first day of the service, one week after Willie Walsh of British Airways pledged to the United Nations that aviation would deliver deep cuts in carbon emissions, was disrupted by activists from Plane Stupid and Fight the Flights dressed up in business suits.

=== London Olympics 2012 ===
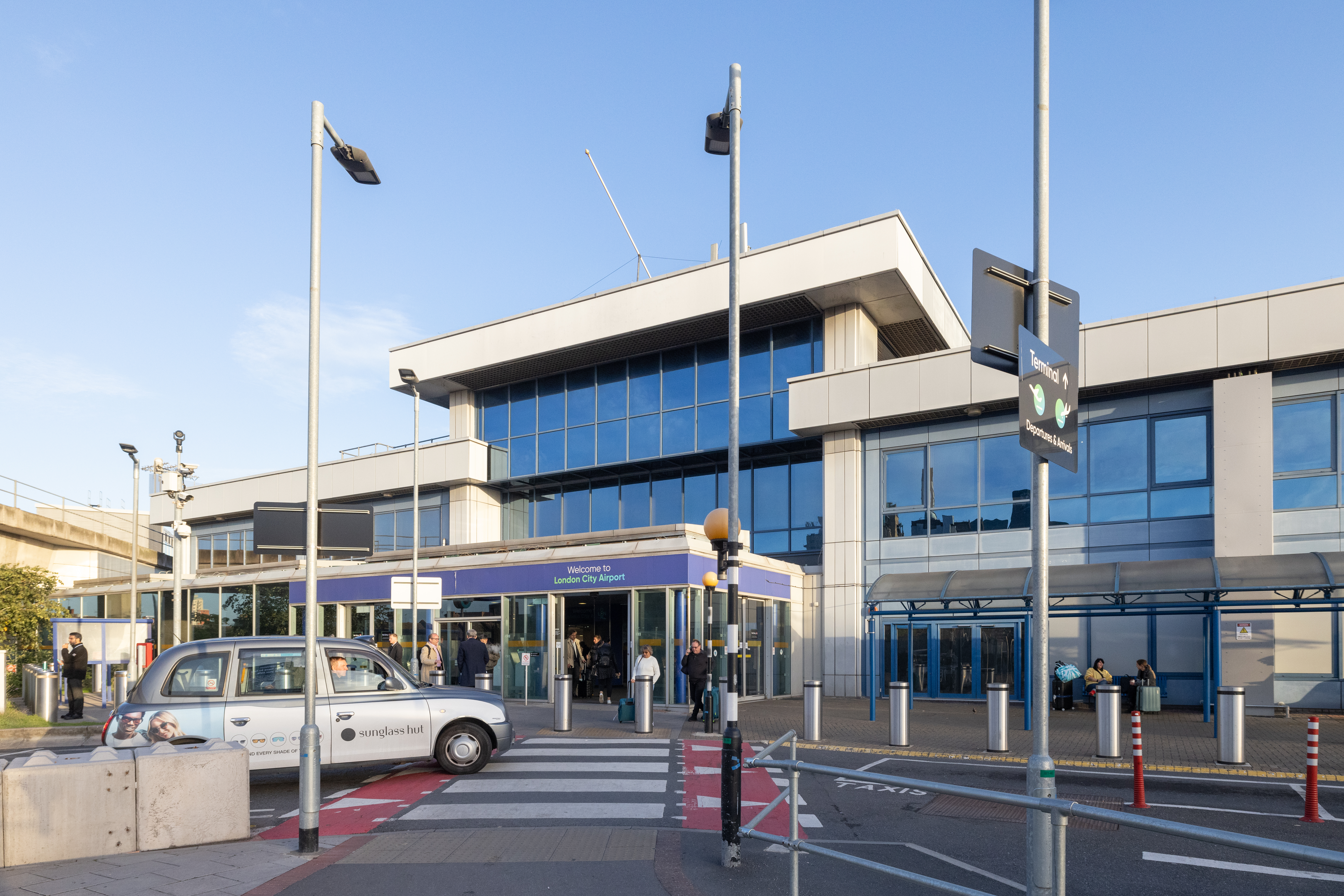
Terminal building

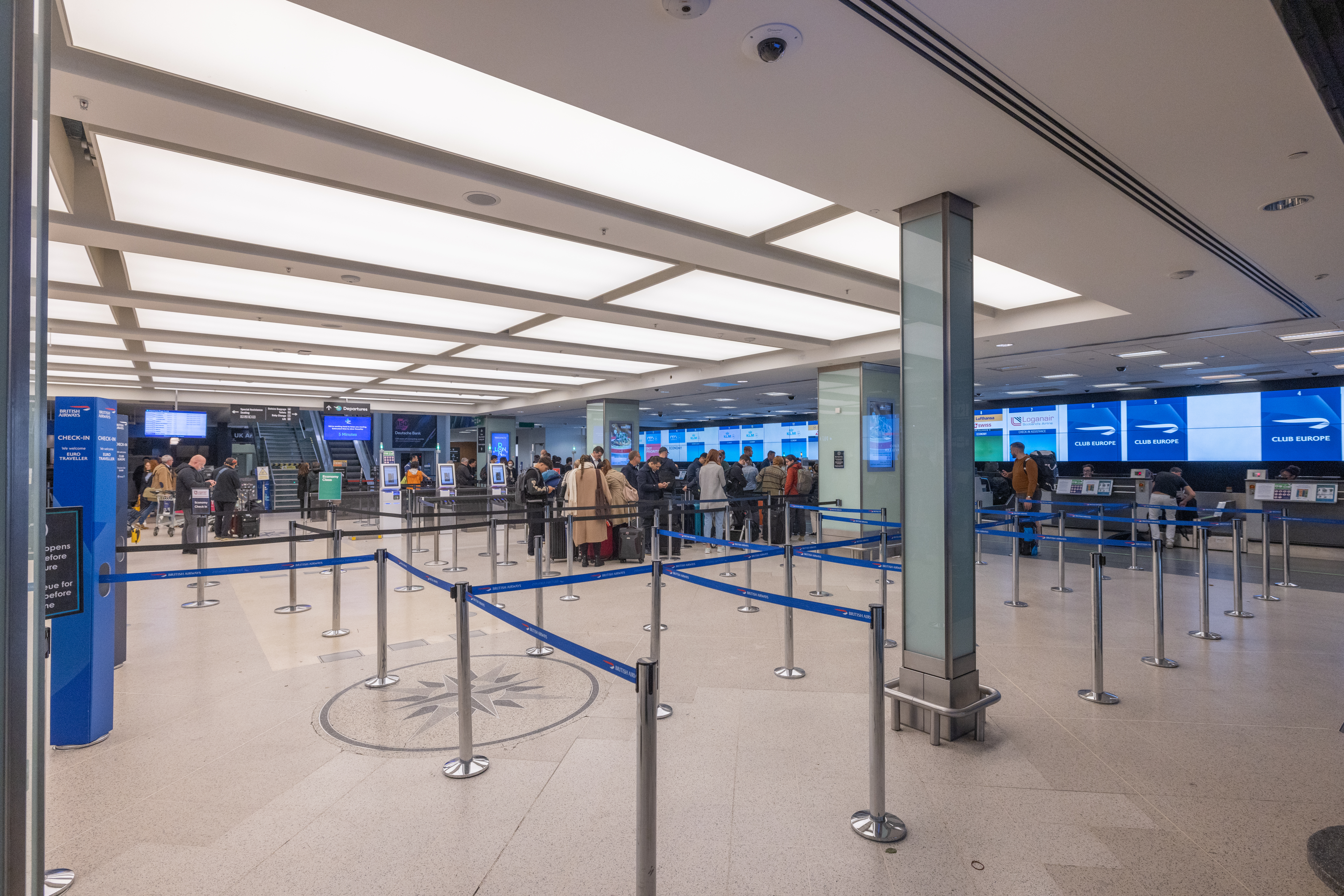
Terminal interior

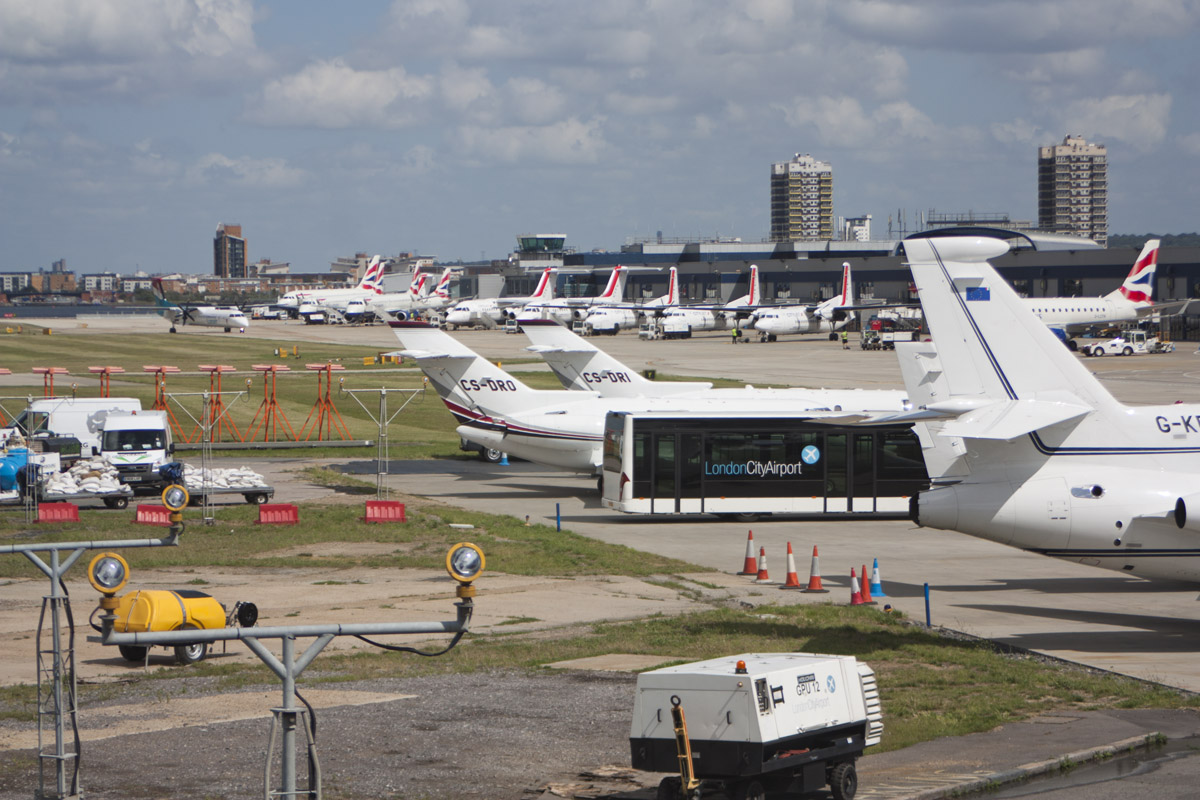
Apron view looking eastwards, with business jets on the jet centre apron in the foreground

Before the 2012 Summer Olympics in London, it was reported that over £7 million (in 2011) was invested in the terminal to extend the Central Search area and adding other improvements. During the Games, however, the airport was only open for a few hours with strict restrictions (for security), and the small apron and short runway excluded most long-range arrivals. However, it was the closest airport to Olympic Park, with normal scheduled travel by road of 15 minutes.

=== 2010s expansion ===
In early 2013, work was expected to start on a £15 million investment programme to refurbish the western pier with new departure gates and improved lounges and to redevelop the international arrivals hall and baggage handling areas. In response to the UK government white paper The Future of Air Transport, the airport operators produced a master plan outlining their vision for growth up to 2030. The plan was subject to public consultation during spring 2006, and was republished incorporating comments from this consultation. The master plan shows a phased expansion of the airport, giving the capability of handling 8 million passengers per annum by 2030. It does not propose the addition of a second runway, or significant expansion of the airport boundaries. Phase 1 of this development would be undertaken by 2015. It would include the in-progress construction of the eastern apron extension and provision of a finger pier to the south of this apron to provide passenger access to aircraft using the new parking stands. The terminal building would also be extended to use the triangle of land between it and the railway station. The existing jet centre serving corporate aviation would be extended, a new hangar built to allow aircraft maintenance, and a replacement fire station provided.

Phases 2 and 3 would be undertaken between 2015 and 2030. Further aircraft parking stands would be built to the east of the terminal, and a taxiway would be constructed alongside and to the south of the runway, to avoid the need for aircraft to back-track on the runway. Both these developments would involve further reduction in the water area of the King George V Dock. The existing fuel farm would be relocated to a site at the east of the airport, where it could be supplied by barge, and linked to a hydrant based supply system, thus eliminating both road tanker deliveries and on-airport fuel bowser movements. The existing surface car park would be replaced by a multi-storey car park, allowing extension of the vehicle drop-off and pick up area. The jet centre and hangar facilities would be further extended. Finally the existing terminal building would be replaced.

In line with phase 1 of the master plan, London City Airport made a planning application to the London Borough of Newham in August 2007. This would allow it to increase the number of flights per year from 80,000 to 120,000 by 2010. In July 2008, the Planning Officer for Newham Council produced a report on the Planning Application, recommending that planning permission be granted. The decision was deferred by the council's Development Control Committee at their meeting on 30 July 2008, following a request from Boris Johnson, the Mayor of London, that the decision be delayed until after a study by the National Air Traffic Services (NATS) has been published.

Over 10,000 local residents were consulted by Newham Council over the plan, of which 1,109 replied, 801 with objections and 308 in support. The 801 objections mainly concerned increase in noise, increase in air pollution, surface transport, socio-economics and regeneration. The 308 supporters mainly concerned the reduction of air pollution, an alternative London and 2012 Olympic gateway, additional jobs, and benefits to the local economy. The residents campaign group HACAN East (formerly Fight the Flights) was opposed to expansion due to noise and pollution issues.

On 29 September 2009, Fight the Flights took Newham Council to court in order to challenge their decision to allow a 50% increase from 76,000 to 120,000 flights. On 20 January 2010, the challenge was dismissed, and a deadline of 14 days to appeal was set. The plan was given the go-ahead in February 2015. However this was overturned by Boris Johnson in March 2015. On 27 July 2016, London City Airport was given approval by authorities to implement the £344 million expansion plan.

=== Latest developments ===
In October 2015, Global Infrastructure Partners which owned 75% of the facility, put it up for sale, with the agreement of Oaktree Capital Management which held the remaining 25%. A sale to a Canadian-led consortium of Alberta Investment Management Corporation, OMERS, the Ontario Teachers' Pension Plan and Wren House Infrastructure Management of the Kuwait Investment Authority for £2 billion was confirmed in February 2016, taking a 25% stake each. The sale was completed on 10 March 2016.

In September 2016, British Airways announced the termination of one of its two daily long-haul all-business class Airbus A318 services from the airport to New York City, citing economic reasons.

Green Party of England and Wales candidate for the 2016 London mayoral election and member of the London Assembly Siân Berry has been vocal in calling for the closure of London City Airport and subsequent redevelopment of the area it occupies. Caroline Russell, the leader of the Green Party on the London Assembly and Scott Ainslie, former Green MEP for London and councillor on Lambeth Council have both called for its closure.

In March 2020, British Airways suspended its daily service to New York due to the COVID-19 pandemic. In September 2020, the airline confirmed the service would not return.

In November 2020, the new parallel taxiway and eight additional aircraft parking stands were declared operational. These were delivered as part of the first phase of the City Airport Development Programme (CADP). Both the new stands and the parallel taxiway were constructed on a concrete deck mounted on piles driven in to the bed of the King George V Dock.

In January 2021, after a delay due to the COVID-19 pandemic, London City became the first major airport controlled by a remote air traffic control tower. The airport had previously decided to relocate the control tower to a site 80 miles (130 km) away at Swanwick, Hampshire, utilising three cable links providing live video to air traffic controllers.

In July 2023, the revised operating distances for the runway became operational following the introduction of Engineered Material Arresting Systems (EMAS) in the Runway Safety Areas at each end of the runway.

Plans were approved to increase the passenger cap at the airport from 6.5 million to 9 million passengers, with the number of morning flights increasing between 06:00 and 09:00.

In June 2025, Australian company Macquarie Asset Management acquired a 25% stake in the airport from Ontario Teacher's Pension Plan. In October 2025, Macquarie took an additional 50% stake in the airport from Alberta Investment Management Corporation and OMERS.

== Operations ==
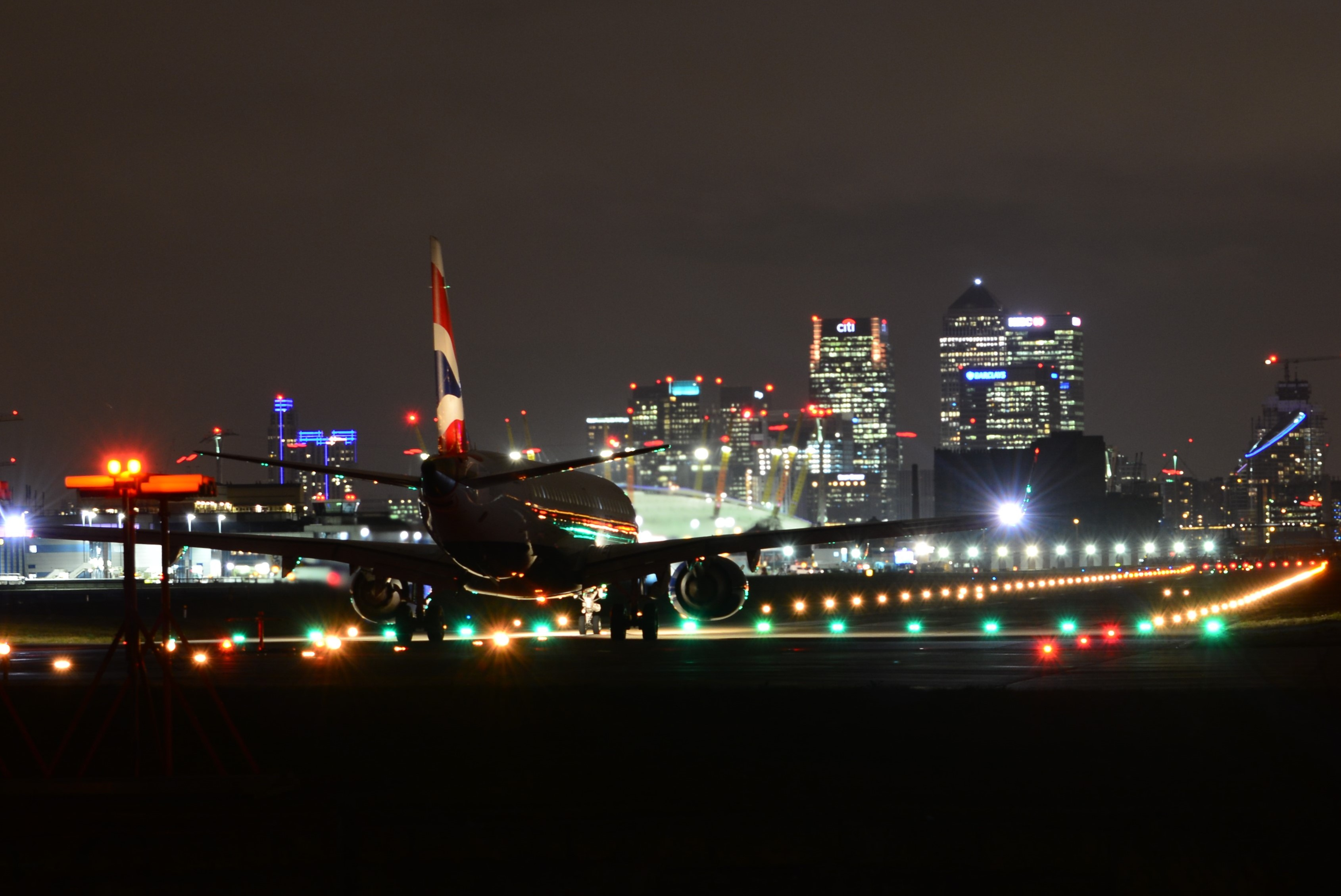
The airport at night, with Canary Wharf visible in the background

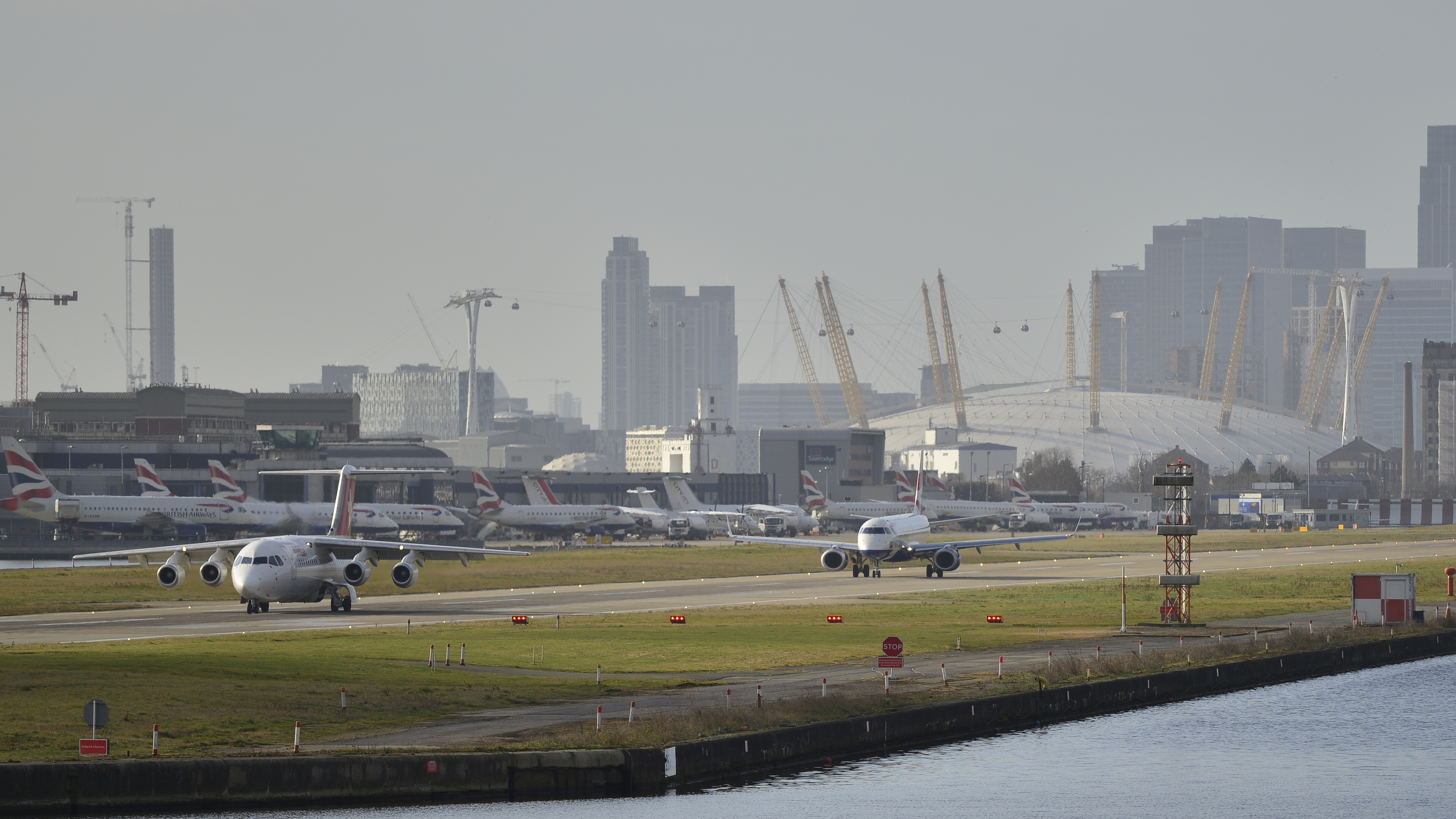
Apron and runway overview, with the O2 visible in the background

=== Destinations served ===
Owing to London City Airport's proximity to London's Docklands and financial district, the airport's primary users are business travellers with destinations such as Luxembourg and Frankfurt, although the number of leisure destinations served like Palma de Mallorca, Málaga or Chambéry has increased. London City is at its busiest during the winter months, when a number of airlines, most notably British Airways and Swiss International Air Lines, fly to ski resort gateway destinations. Zürich, Geneva, and Milan are among the destinations popular among winter sports enthusiasts.

=== Facilities and aircraft types ===
As the airport is close to Central London, it has stringent rules imposed to limit the noise impact from aircraft operations. This, together with the physical dimensions of the 1,508-metre-long (4,948 ft) runway and the steep glideslope, limits the aircraft types that can use the airport. The size and layout of the airport, and the overall complexity caused by the lack of taxiways, mean that the airport gets very busy during peak hours. The air traffic controllers have to deal with over 38 flights per hour on a runway which, prior to the opening of the full length taxiway at the end of 2020, required a lengthy backtrack for each aircraft needing to depart from runway 27 or land on runway 09. Operations are restricted to 06:30 to 22:30 Monday to Friday, 06:30 to 13:00 on Saturdays and 12:30 to 22:30 on Sundays. These restrictions are related to noise. On 19 December 2022, the airport applied for the restriction on Saturday afternoon to be removed. This application was rejected by Newham Council on 10 July 2023, citing "continued concerns over the noise and environmental impact of the airport on those living nearby."

Mid-range airliners seen at London City include the ATR 42 (both −300 and −500 variants), ATR 72, Airbus A318, Bombardier Dash 8 Q400, BAe 146/Avro RJ, Dornier 328, Embraer ERJ 135, Embraer 170, Embraer 190 and Fokker 50. On 30 January 2009, trials were completed successfully with the ATR 72–500, leading to its approval for use at the airport. The Embraer 190SR underwent trials from 28 March 2009, and thereafter gained approval. The Fokker 70, BAe Jetstream 41, Saab 340 and Saab 2000 also have approval for scheduled operations at the airport. A number of airlines including Swiss and Odyssey have ordered the Airbus A220 with the intention of operating it from London City once delivered and approved. A220-100 operations for Swiss from City commenced in late 2017.

On 22–23 March 2017, the A220-100 completed tests for the 5.5-degree approach in Wichita and Salina, Kansas. The A220-100 was certified for the steep approach landing for London City in April 2017. In 2023, Airbus confirmed working on certifying the larger A220-300 for operation at the airport. Corporate aircraft such as the Beechcraft Super King Air, Cessna CitationJet series, Hawker 400, Hawker 800, Piaggio Avanti and variants of the Dassault Falcon business jets are increasingly common. The airport is not available for use by single-engine aircraft or helicopters; recreational flights and single-pilot operations are also not permitted. In 2025, the airport authority applied for approval of the significantly larger Airbus A320neo to be operated into the airport.

On 26 March 2025, an Embraer E195-E2 operated by Helvetic Airways landed at London City Airport for the first time. The E195-E2 is the largest certified aircraft at the airport.

The size of the airport, constrained by the water-filled Royal Albert and King George V docks to the north and south respectively, also means that there are no covered maintenance facilities for aircraft. In the late 2000s, AirSea Lines envisaged using the airport as a seaplane base.

== Terminal ==
With space limited in East London, and comparatively low passenger volumes, London City Airport is small compared with other airports serving London. The airport has a single, two-storey passenger terminal building with 15 gates, all hardstands. The ground floor contains the check-in desks and some service facilities as well as a staircase leading to the security control on the upper level, after which the airside waiting area and several more shops can be found. The waiting area is connected to piers on both sides where corridors on the upper floor lead to the departure gates on the ground level. As the airport has no jet bridges, walk-boarding is used on all stands.

== Airlines and destinations ==
The following airlines operate regular services to and from London City Airport:

Airlines	Destinations
Air Dolomiti	Frankfurt
Aurigny	Guernsey
British Airways	Amsterdam, Belfast–City, Berlin, Dublin, Edinburgh, Florence, Glasgow, Ibiza, Madrid, Málaga, Milan–Linate, Palma de Mallorca, Rotterdam/The Hague, Zürich; Seasonal: Barcelona, Bergerac, Chambéry, Innsbruck, Faro, Geneva, Nice, Olbia, San Sebastián, Skiathos, Split, Thessaloniki, Toulon
ITA Airways	Milan–Linate
KLM	Amsterdam
Luxair	Luxembourg
Swiss International Air Lines	Zürich

== Statistics ==
=== Passengers ===
Passenger numbers at London City Airport saw rapid growth between 2003 and 2008, doubling from around 1.5 million per year to over 3 million. Totals declined in 2009 and 2010, but have since recovered and in 2019 over 5.1 million passengers passed through London City. In 2020, passenger numbers sharply dropped to below 1 million annually during the COVID-19 pandemic.

Year	Passengers (Note: Number of passengers including both domestic and international.)	Aircraft movements (Note: Total aircraft takeoffs and landings.)
1997	1,161,116	34,605
1998	1,360,187	39,078
1999	1,385,965	44,376
2000	1,583,843	52,643
2001	1,618,833	57,361
2002	1,602,335	56,291
2003	1,470,576	52,856
2004	1,674,807	61,029
2005	1,996,397	71,105
2006	2,377,318	79,436
2007	2,928,820	91,177
2008	3,271,716	94,516
2009	2,802,296	76,861
2010	2,793,813	68,640
2011	3,009,783	68,792
2012	3,030,005	70,781
2013	3,390,264	74,006
2014	3,702,032	76,260
2015	4,319,749	84,753
2016	4,526,059	85,169
2017	4,511,107	80,490
2018	4,800,190	78,036
2019	5,100,025	80,751
2020	905,326	18,850
2021	713,969	12,921
2022	2,990,201	44,731
2023	3,412,122	52,101
2024	3,569,871	50,956
2025	3,737,888	50,992
^{Source: UK Civil Aviation Authority}

=== Routes ===
Busiest routes to and from London City (2024)
Rank	Airport	Total passengers	Change 2023–2024
1	Amsterdam	563,953	▲8.8%
2	Edinburgh	334,893	▼ -2.3%
3	Zurich	331,913	▼ -6.5%
4	Dublin	266,658	▲10.7%
5	Milan (Linate)	260,840	▲159.1%
6	Frankfurt	234,909	▼ -6.2%
7	Glasgow	207,739	▼ -0.4%
8	Berlin	198,121	▲13.2%
9	Luxembourg	162,657	▼ -3.2%
10	Belfast–City	122,445	▼ -7.3%

== Ground transport ==
=== Docklands Light Railway ===
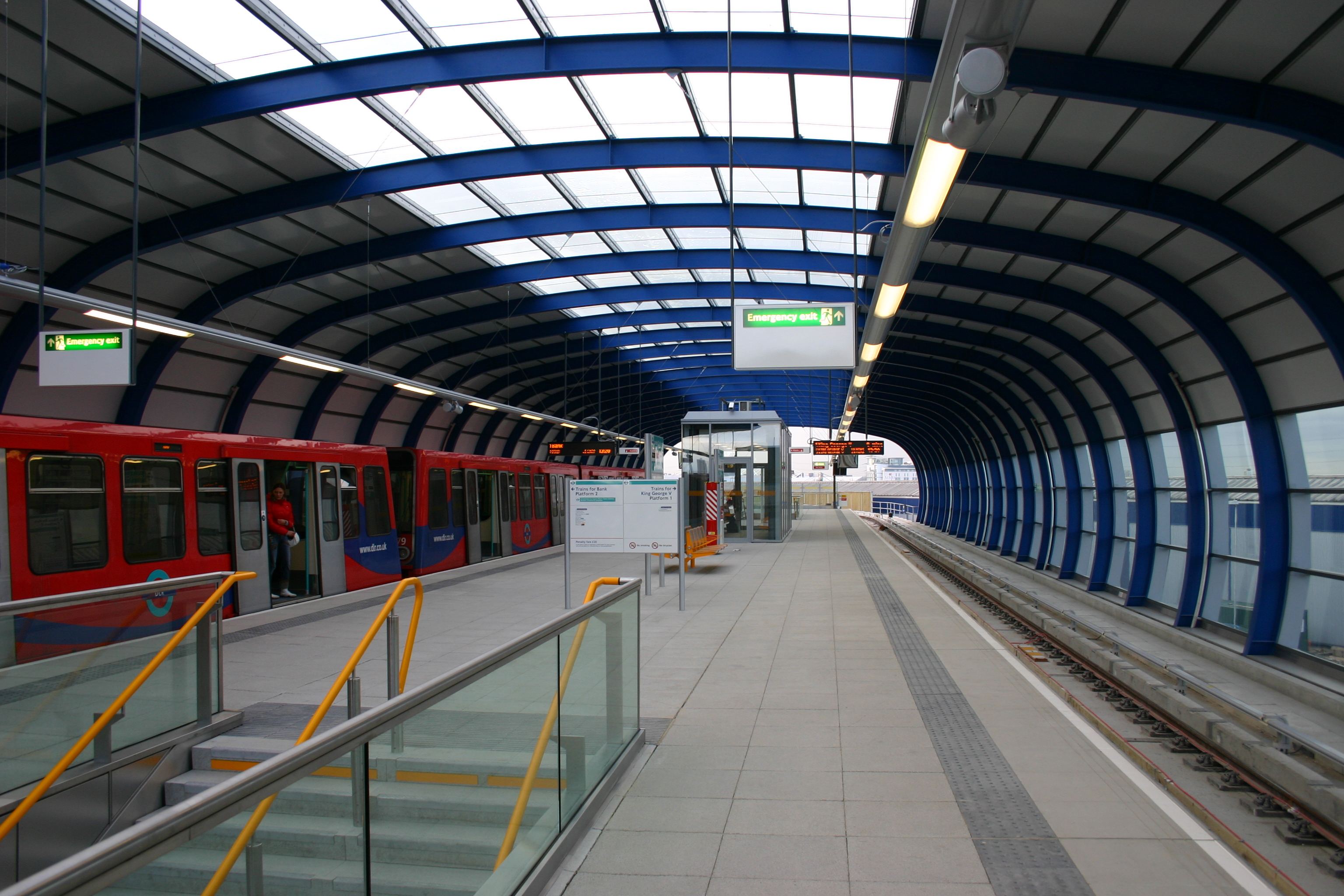
London City Airport DLR station (2006)

London City Airport is served by London City Airport DLR station, which is an elevated station adjoining the terminal building. The station is on a branch of the Docklands Light Railway, which links the airport to Canary Wharf and the City of London as well as to Stratford International and Woolwich Arsenal stations with interchanges to London Underground, London Overground, Elizabeth line, Greater Anglia, c2c, Thameslink and Southeastern High Speed train services.

=== Elizabeth line ===
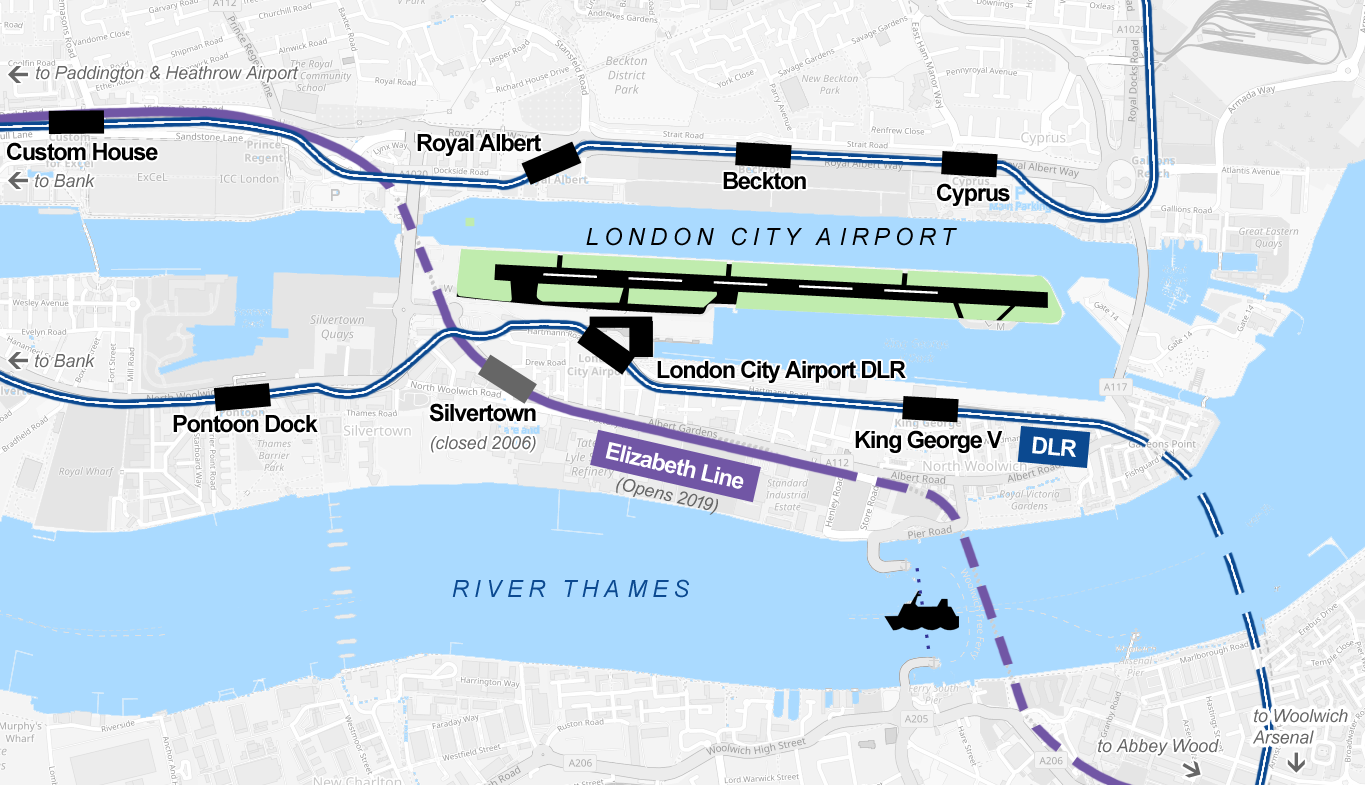
The route of the Elizabeth line passes very close to the airport, but no station serves it (2018 diagram).

Until 2006, Silvertown railway station on the North London line served the airport, but it was closed during the construction of Crossrail. The Elizabeth line, which opened in May 2022, passes around 300 m to the south of the airport, but does not stop there. Proposals were put forward that a new station should be opened on the Elizabeth line to serve the airport, but a London City Airport station was not included in TfL's Crossrail plans. In 2025, TfL set out that they did not support an additional Elizabeth line station in the area, as it could lead to increased operating costs and slower journeys for existing passengers using the line.

=== Road access ===
The airport is served by the A1020 road and the A112 road. These give fast links to Canning Town, the City of London and Stratford, as well as connecting to the A13 and the North Circular Road, London (A406). Also the A13 provides easy access to the M25 motorway, as with the A406 connecting to the M11 motorway. The airport has both a short-term and a long-term car park, both within walking distance of the terminal and a taxi rank outside the terminal door.

=== Local buses ===
The airport is served by London Buses services. The express shuttle buses, which formerly ran to various destinations, were withdrawn after the DLR line was built.

=== River bus ===
Thames Clippers services call at a pier at the nearby residential development Royal Wharf, allowing travel into Central London using an Oyster card or contactless smart card.

== Accidents and incidents ==
- On 13 February 2009, BA CityFlyer Flight 8456 (an Avro RJ100, registered G-BXAR, flying from Amsterdam) suffered a nose-gear collapse while landing at London City. None of the 67 passengers or five crew members were seriously injured in the incident, but three passengers suffered minor injuries; two of them were kept in hospital overnight. The aircraft was damaged beyond economic repair, and was written off by insurers in May 2009.
- On 21 October 2016, 27 people were injured, two of them seriously, when a tear gas substance was released in London City Airport. Hundreds of other passengers reported experiencing temporary blindness and itching. Many flights were cancelled, leaving thousands stranded and causing major disruption around Europe. A few days later, police arrested a suspect under "terror offences" and the media referred to the incident as a terror attack. Police later confirmed that tear gas bottles had deliberately been placed to "cause harm or disruption". Security was increased at the airport in the days following the attack.

== See also ==
- List of airports in the United Kingdom and the British Crown Dependencies
- Airports of London
