= Pendleton Together =

Tenant management organization

Pendleton Together Operating Limited
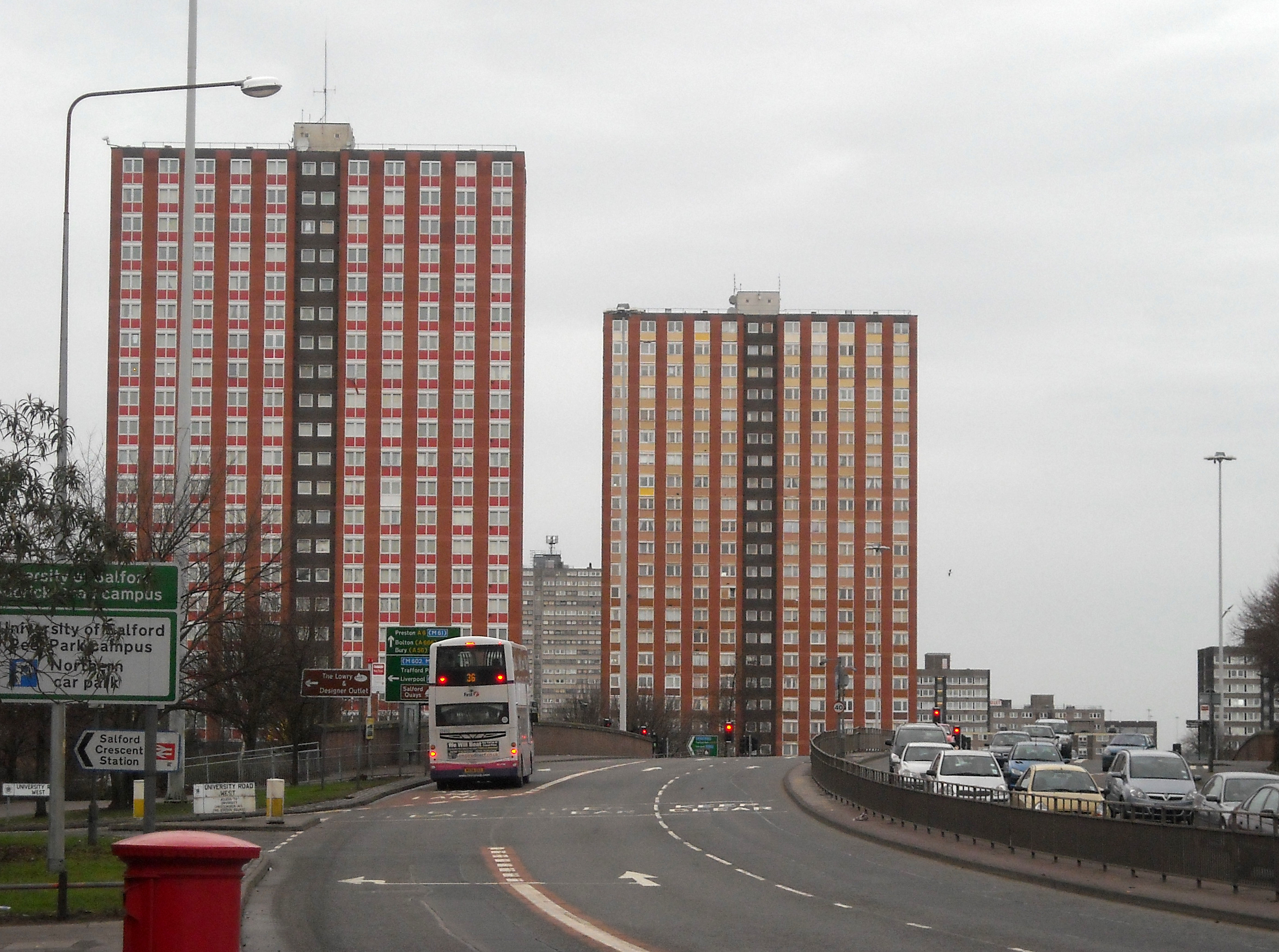
- Thorn Court and Spruce Court, two housing blocks managed by Pendleton Together
- Trade name: Pendleton Together
- Company type: private finance initiative (PFI) contractor; tenant management organisation (TMO)
- Industry: Council housing; Social housing
- Founded: July 1, 2007; 17 years ago
- Headquarters: Brotherton House, Loganberry Avenue, Salford, England
- Area served: Pendleton, Salford
- Parent: Together Housing Group Ltd.; Pendleton Together Holdings Ltd.
- Website: www.pendletontogether.co.uk

Pendleton Together is a tenant management organisation (TMO) in Pendleton, Salford, England. It manages part of the council housing stock of Salford City Council. It was formed in 2013. As of 2023 it managed over 1,000 homes, with plans for expansion.

== Formation ==
In 2008, the council unveiled its plan for a Pendleton PFI scheme to manage some of its most "challenging" housing. The £650 million Creating a New Pendleton urban regeneration scheme was finally launched in September 2013. Pendleton Together was formed to administer parts of the regeneration, and was a consortium including Together Housing Group, Keepmoat, Lathams architects, and Salford City Council. In 2013 it secured a 30 year contract with the council to manage and maintain specific tower blocks.

== Safety ==
In June 2017, it was reported that council tower blocks in Pendleton used similar aluminium composite material (ACM) cladding that had been a major contributing factor in the Grenfell Tower fire earlier that month. Nine blocks managed by Pendleton Together (Note: Thorn Court, Spruce Court, Beech Court, Plane Court, Salix Court, Malus Court, Whitebeam Court, Hornbeam Court, and Holm Court were found to use ACM cladding.) required fire safety and other improvements. Work began in 2017 to remove the cladding, but halted in the same year. One reason for delays in replacing the combustible cladding was that Pendleton Together, technically a private contractor, was not eligible for public funding made available by the national government in the wake of the Grenfell fire. The cladding removal resumed in 2020, but as of April 2024 had not been replaced, resulting in cold and damp living conditions and causing a series of resident protests against the company.
