= Together Housing Group =

English social housing company

Together Housing Group Limited
- Company type: Community Benefit Society
- Industry: Housing
- Founded: April 2011; 15 years ago
- Headquarters: Bull Green House, Halifax, England
- Revenue: £ 190,000,000 (2021-2022)
- Number of employees: 1,448 (FTE) (2022)
- Subsidiaries: Together Housing Association Ltd.; Pendleton Together; and others
- Website: www.togetherhousing.group

Together Housing Group is a social housing management company and affordable housing developer operating in the North of England and the East Midlands. As of July 2024 Together Housing Group (THG) manages or owns around 38,000 homes, including rented social housing, affordable housing, and supported housing.

== Origins ==
The group was founded in April 2011 as parent company to various housing associations, including Chevin Housing Association, Pennine Housing 2000, Green Vales Homes, Twin Valley Homes, Housing Pendle, and Harewood Housing Society. In March 2016 these five individual housing associations were replaced with a single asset-owning subsidiary named Together Housing Association Limited (previously Hallam Housing Society) while the Group itself converted to a Community Benefit Society.

== Subsidiaries and related entities ==
Subsidiaries of THG include:

- The development company Synergy Housing Solutions Limited
- Pendleton Together Operating Limited and Pendleton Together Holdings Limited, used to carry out and finance a Private Finance Initiative scheme to manage 1,250 council houses in Salford
- SP Plus (Development) Limited, used for urban regeneration and development in Pendleton
- Newground Together, a social charity, and its consultancy services subsidiary Newground CIC
- Together Roof Energy Limited and Together Roof Energy SPV Limited, used for alternative energy programmes
- Together Housing Finance PLC, used to issue bonds, and Together Commercial Limited, used to carry out investments.

The company is also part of several joint ventures.

== Funding ==
The company and its subsidiaries receive grants and loans from both private and public sources. In 2012 the group raised £250 million through the direct issue of its own 30-year bond. THG has received various contracts funded by the Homes and Communities Agency and other government sources, including a £15 million contract for a development scheme in Accrington in 2014. In 2024 it received a £50 million loan from the Royal Bank of Scotland to be used for the sustainable refurbishment of its properties.

== Regulation ==
Together Housing is subject to regulation by the Regulator of Social Housing, which sets standards for social landlords on governance, financial viability, rents and value for money.
