= Odyssey Airlines =

British startup airline

- Founded: September 2010
- Operating bases: London City Airport
- Headquarters: London, England, United Kingdom
- Key people: Adam D. Scott (CEO); John Bavister (CFO)
- Website: www.flyody.com

Odyssey Airlines is a British startup airline headquartered in London with a planned base at London City Airport. It was founded in 2010 and planned to launch operations in late 2020 / early 2021. As of December 2025, no flight is scheduled.

== History ==
The airline was incorporated in September 2010 and is headquartered at a business property at Spital Square in London. The airline was first revealed in an article by Reuters in December 2011, citing it as being one of the undisclosed customers of the Bombardier CSeries aircraft, now the Airbus A220-100. During the 2013 Paris Air Show, Bombardier and Odyssey officially revealed the identity of the airline to the public, with an original launch year stated as 2016.

In April 2014, it started to raise $5 million through crowdfunding. Since 2016, the launch date has been pushed back several times.

Odyssey Airlines plans to operate as a premium carrier, offering an all-business class service onboard its aircraft. The planned service from London-City to New York was previously operated in a similar way by British Airways on board an Airbus A318-100 in all-business class configuration.

In March 2026, Airbus removed the order of 10 A220-100s from its monthly tally of orders and deliveries.

== Destinations ==
The airline plans to be based at London City Airport and will serve mainly medium and long haul destinations, such as New York City and Toronto. A detailed plan of further future destinations has not been revealed yet.

== Fleet ==
Odyssey Airlines fleet
Aircraft	In service	On order	Passengers	Notes
Airbus A220-100	–	10	38	Order cancelled in March 2026
Total	–	10

== See also ==
- London City Airport
