= Skyline (Nigeria) =

Nigerian former airline

IATA	ICAO	Call sign
-	SMT	SKYLIMIT
- Founded: 1999
- Ceased operations: 2003
- Hubs: Port Harcourt Airport
- Secondary hubs: phc
- Fleet size: 3
- Parent company: arkia israeli airlines Limited
- Headquarters: Lagos in Nigeria

Skyline was an airline based in Lagos, Nigeria operating chartered and scheduled domestic passenger flights out of Port Harcourt Airport. It was established in March 1999 and started operations in June 1999. In 2003, the airline ceased to exist due to bankruptcy.

== Fleet ==
The Skyline fleet consisted of 3 canadair dhc 7 aircraft.
