= Halbzeit =

2002 painting by Michel Majerus

- Artist: Michel Majerus
- Year: 2002
- Medium: Acrylic on canvas
- Dimensions: 220 cm × 200 cm (87 in × 79 in)
- Location: Mudam, Luxembourg City

Halbzeit is a painting by the Luxembourgish artist Michel Majerus. Created in 2002, it was one of the last paintings by the artist before he died in an aviation accident, and is part of the collection of the Grand Duke Jean Museum of Modern Art (Mudam) in Luxembourg City (acquired in 2002). It is painted with acrylic paint on canvas and is 220 cm high and 200 cm wide.

== Description ==
The large canvas looks as if it was painted very quickly, in a gestural manner, with all-over violet streaks of paint on top of a previous work. Majerus seems to have scratched into the wet layer of purple paint in a semi-random way. The bottom right quarter of the canvas depicts two words that look like logos of consumer products found in a supermarket: thirst and juice. A blue starburst is placed between both words.

== Interpretation ==
In a lot of his work, Michel Majerus used elements from mass culture and popular culture, from video games and pop music to corporate language. In Halbzeit, the two depicted words or logos, thirst - juice, sound like a commercial slogan or advertisement, which immediately connects a consumer's desire ('thirst') with a product ('juice').

The title of the painting can be translated to the English term half-time, referring to the interval of time between two halves of a sports match. According to the Mudam, Michel Majerus and this work, Halbzeit, talk about the concept of time and more specifically the present era, where time is sold, commercialized and divided. The half-time in this work is the moment where an advertisement reaches its target: the consumer.
