= Luxair =

Flag carrier of Luxembourg

- Luxair Boeing 737-700
IATA	ICAO	Call sign
LG	LGL	LUXAIR
- Founded: 1948; 78 years ago
- Commenced operations: 31 March 1962; 64 years ago
- Hubs: Luxembourg Airport
- Frequent-flyer program: Miles & More
- Fleet size: 23
- Destinations: 95
- Headquarters: Munsbach, Luxembourg
- Key people: Gilles Feith (CEO)
- Website: www.luxair.lu

Luxair, legally Luxair, Société Luxembourgeoise de Navigation Aérienne S.A., is the flag carrier passenger airline (Note: Cargolux is the flag carrier cargo airline of Luxembourg.) of Luxembourg with its headquarters in Munsbach, Luxembourg, and hub at Luxembourg Airport. It operates scheduled services to destinations in Europe, North Africa, the Mediterranean and the Middle East with additional charter and seasonal services. It is Luxembourg's only passenger-carrying airline offering regular, non-charter service.

== History ==
=== Early years ===
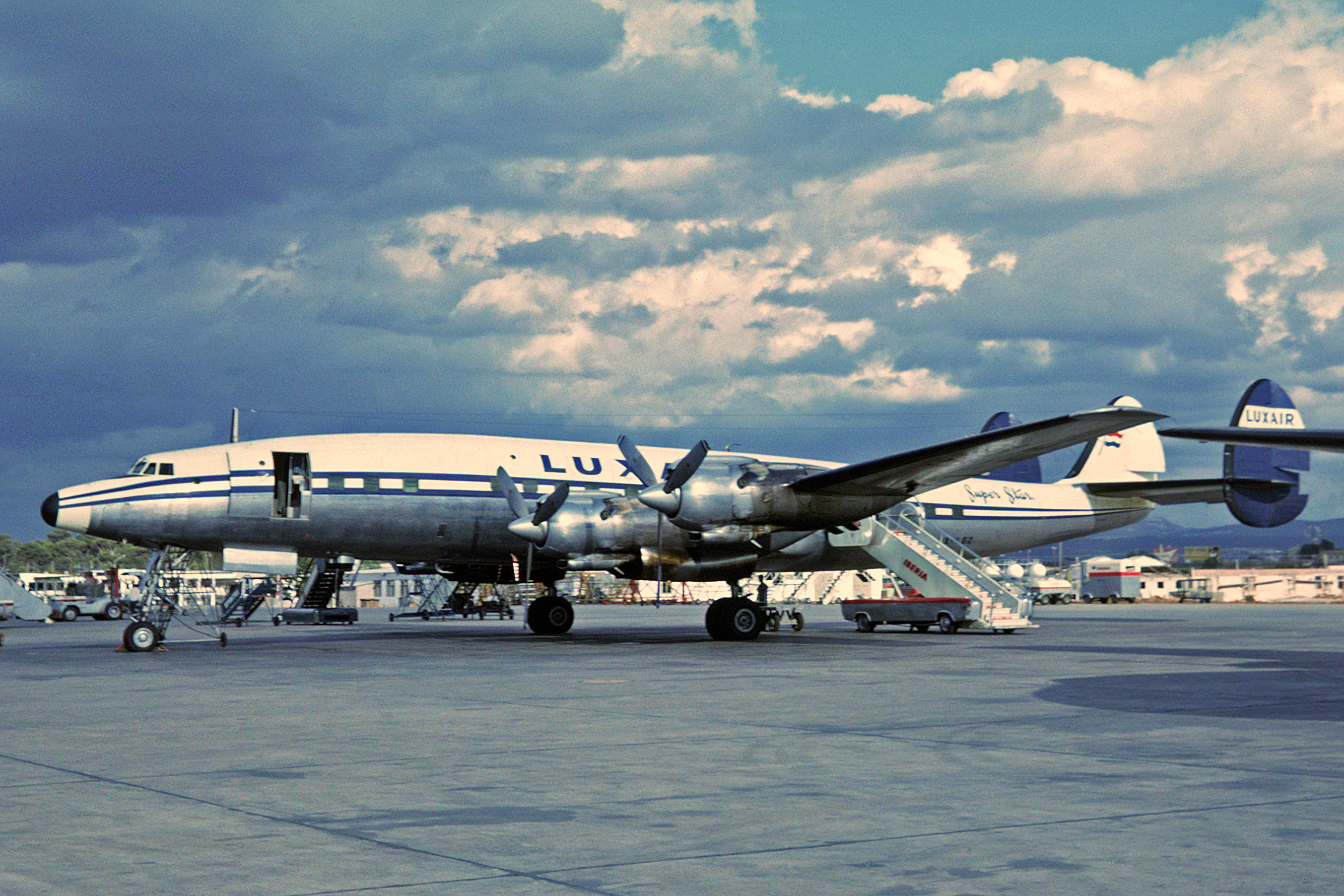
A former Luxair Lockheed L-1649A Starliner

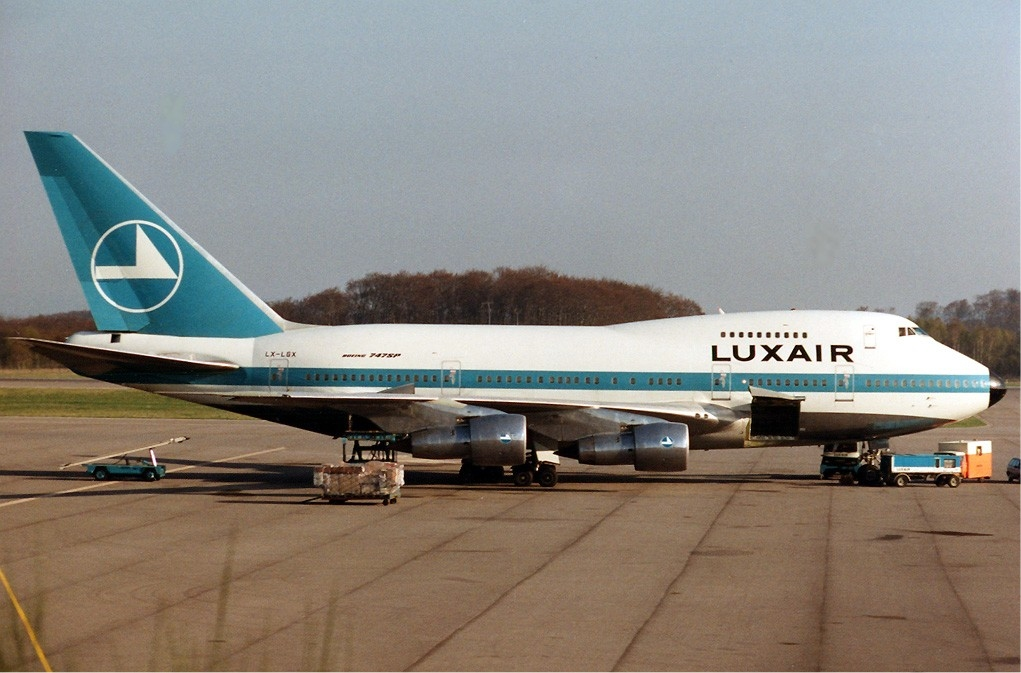
A former Luxair Boeing 747SP

Luxair descended from Luxembourg Airlines, which was founded in 1948. Luxair was set up in 1961 to meet the growing demand for air links between Luxembourg and other European cities. In 1962, Luxembourg Airlines became Luxair and began flights by launching a Luxembourg–Paris route with a Fokker F27 Friendship.

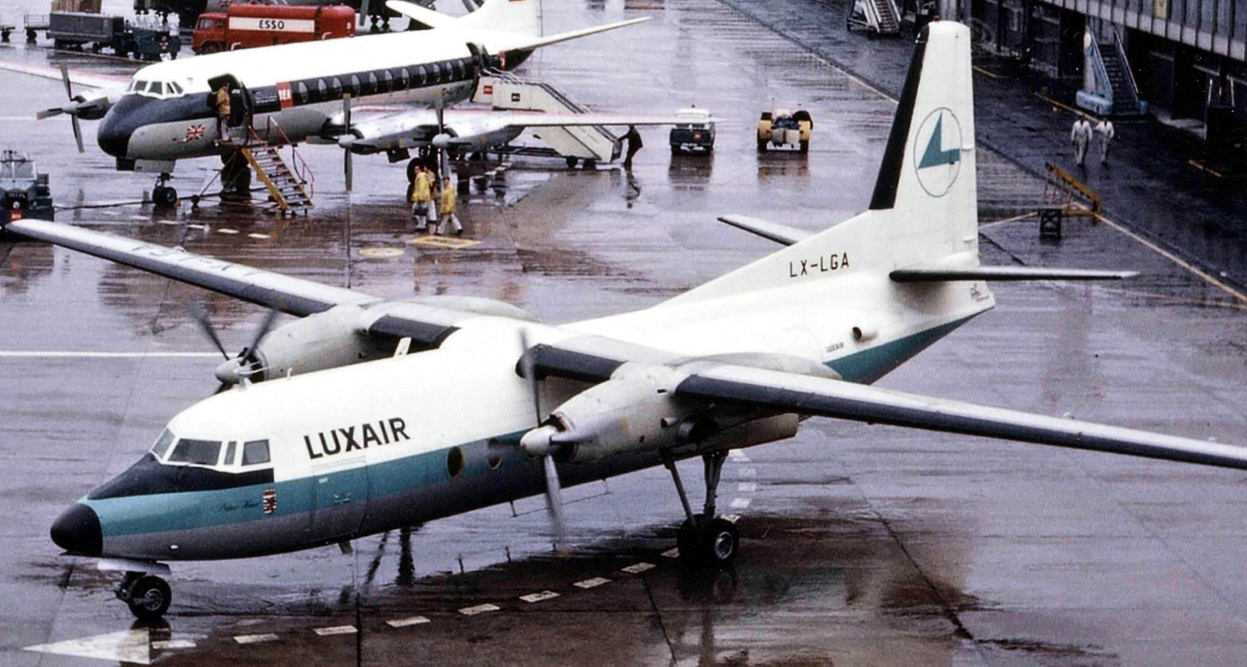
Luxair's first aircraft was this Fokker F27 Friendship, pictured here in 1966.

From 1964 to 1969, Luxair operated three Lockheed L-1649A Starliner aircraft in a cooperative agreement with Trek Airways, from Luxembourg to Johannesburg. The Starliners were painted in Luxair livery and were registered in Luxembourg. By 1967, Luxair's fleet consisted of three Fokker F27 Friendships and one Vickers Viscount. The latter was written off in a non-fatal accident in 1969 and replaced the following year by the airline's first jet airliner, a Sud Aviation Caravelle. By 1976, Luxair was operating a Boeing 707 with a Boeing 737-200 then joining the fleet in 1977.

Over the years, Luxair gradually introduced further jet aircraft: Boeing 737-400s and Boeing 737-500s; as well as Fokker 50 turboprops and Embraer ERJ-135 and ERJ-145 regional jets. In the 1980s, Boeing 747SPs owned by South African Trek Airways and operated by LUXAVIA were painted in Luxair colours, flying routes between South Africa and Europe, as well as holiday charters from Luxembourg. LUXAVIA was a joint venture between Trek Airways and Luxair, enabling Trek Airways to avoid the repercussions of widespread anti-Apartheid boycotts.

=== Development since the 2000s ===
In March 2003, Luxair ordered two new Boeing 737-700s to replace its older Boeing aircraft. The first of the new aircraft was delivered on 18 February 2004. A third aircraft was ordered in August 2003 and delivered in January 2005.

Luxair's old logo, used from 21 October 1961 to 20 December 2003

On 21 December 2003, Luxair launched a new logo depicting a flying boomerang. The previous logo had been in use for 42 years.

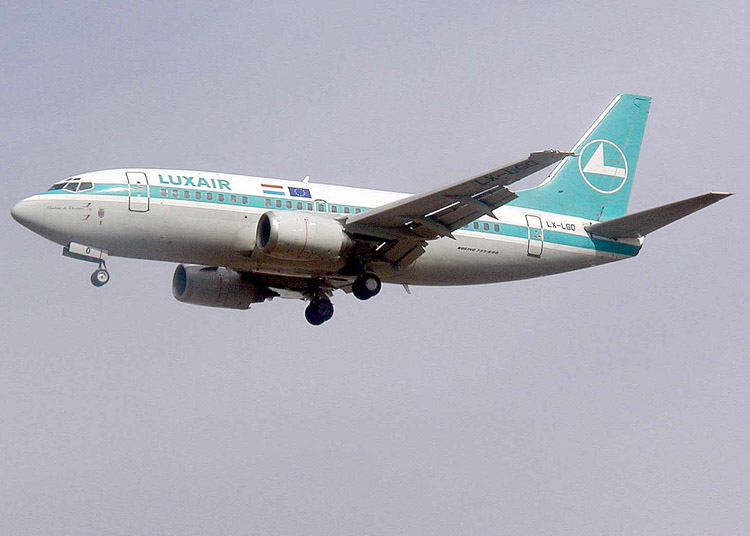
A former Luxair Boeing 737-500

To move to an all-jet fleet, the last Fokker 50 aircraft was withdrawn from service in April 2005. The rising cost of oil made operating regional jets increasingly difficult. To lessen its exposure, Luxair decided to reintroduce turboprop aircraft, and in June 2006, it signed a firm order with Bombardier Aerospace for three Dash 8-Q400s, plus three options. The last of the three aircraft was delivered in September 2007. Two additional Q400s were ordered later.

In October 2008, Luxair decided to place an order for its first Boeing 737-800. This aircraft replaced the last Boeing 737-500 in Luxair's fleet and facilitated Luxair's offer on its holiday destinations. In 2009, the airline was awarded as the most punctual scheduled operator at London City Airport during 2008 by Flight on Time, based on CAA statistics. In 2011, Luxair carried 1,302,771 passengers.

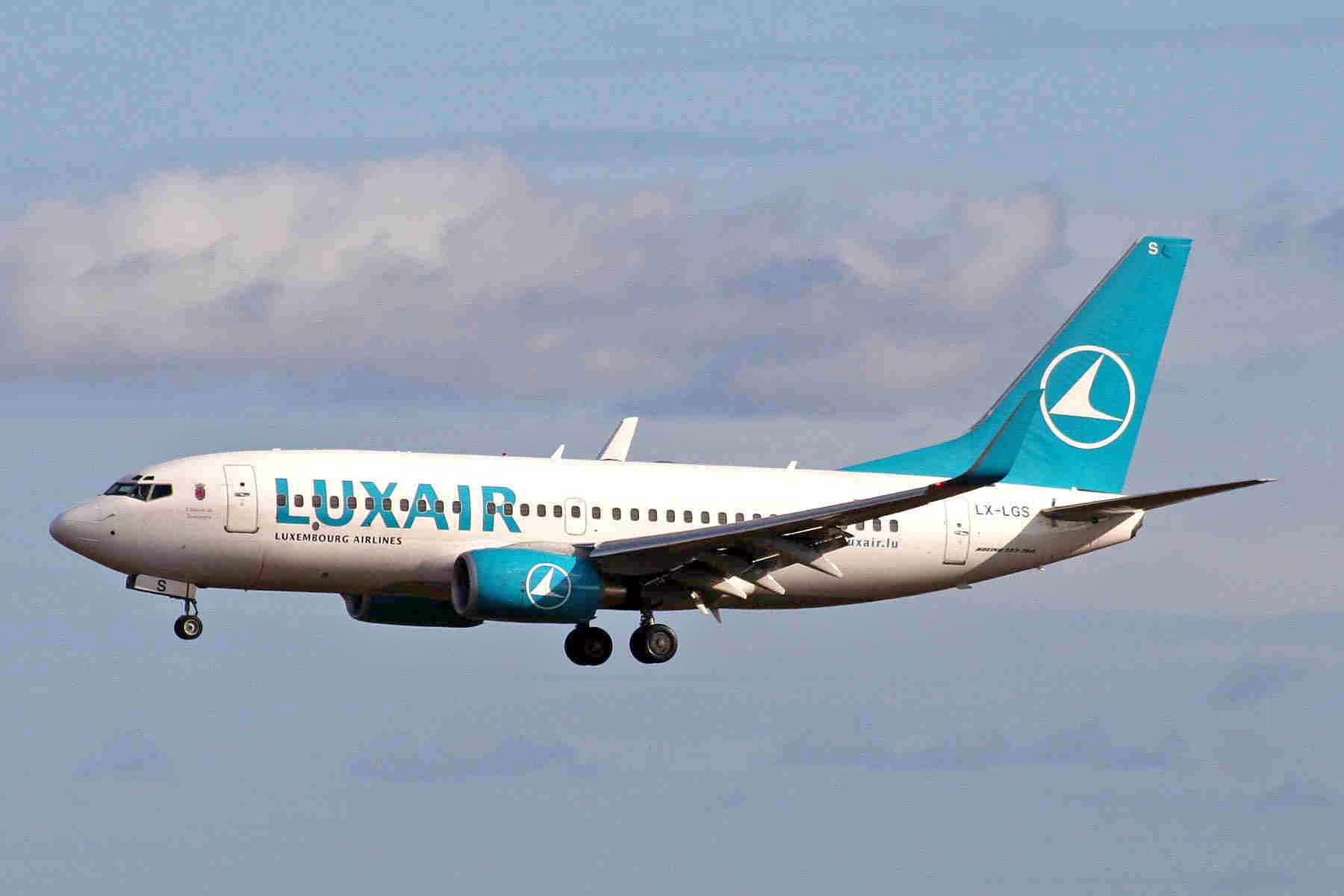
Boeing 737-700 in 2000s livery

In 2013 and 2014, two new Boeing 737-800s fitted with Boeing Sky Interior became part of the fleet, which enabled Luxair to retire the last Boeing 737-500 from service.

In July 2015, Luxair's minority shareholder Lufthansa announced it would sell its 13 per cent stake in the airline it had held since 1993. The government of Luxembourg was named as the preferred buyer. In November 2015, the sale was finalized when Lufthansa sold its entire stake to the state of Luxembourg. Luxair also announced it would stop flying its route to Frankfurt Airport previously operated on a codeshare with Lufthansa as the latter started the same route itself. Luxair is still part of the Lufthansa frequent flyer program Miles & More.

After the bankruptcy of Air Berlin, Luxair announced they would begin flying from Saarbrücken Airport to Berlin Tegel Airport utilising a Bombardier CRJ700 which Luxair leased from Adria Airways based in Saarbrücken.

== Corporate affairs ==
=== Ownership ===
As of November 2015, after Lufthansa sold its shares, the airline is owned by the State of Luxembourg (52.04%), Banque et Caisse d'Épargne de l'État (21.81%), Banque Internationale à Luxembourg (13.14%), the Luxair Group and others (13.11%). In total, the State of Luxembourg owns 74.98% of the company through various state-owned corporations and its holding of 10% of Banque Internationale à Luxembourg.

=== Business trends ===
The key figures for the Luxair Group since 2008 are shown below:

	Turnover (€m)	Net profit (€m)	Number of employees (Note: on average)	Number of passengers (m)	Passenger load factor (%)	Cargo carried (000s tons)	Number of aircraft (Note: at year end)	Notes/sources
2008	417	8.5	2,461	1.22	73.4	810	15	
2009	383	1.3	2,334	1.18	72.9	672	16	
2010	409	8.9	2,317	1.25	73.8	735	16	
2011	429	3.6	2,344	1.30	72.4	678	16	
2012	447	−21.2	2,309	1.37	73.4	638	16	
2013	472	8.2	2,288	1.51	75.3	693	16	
2014	495	−0.4	2,394	1.68	74.5	725	17	
2015	505	9.7	2,438	1.81	72.8	759	17	
2016	498	4.4	2,527	1.84	71.6	822	16	
2017	535	9.5	2,658	1.93	71.6	940	17	
2018	593	12.5	2,828	2.13	72.6	957	17	
2019	615	8.1	2,877	2.14	73.0	893	19	
2020	263	−154	2,820	0.66	58.4	947	19	
2021	457	−2.3	2,705	1.08	68.6	1124	19	
2022	683	67.1	3,118	1.2		995	19	

== Destinations ==
As of September 2026, Luxair flies (or has flown) to the following destinations:

Country	City	Airport	Notes	Ref.
Albania	Tirana	Tirana International Airport		
Austria	Innsbruck	Innsbruck Airport	Seasonal	
Austria	Salzburg	Salzburg Airport	Seasonal	
Austria	Vienna	Vienna International Airport		
Belgium	Antwerp	Antwerp International Airport	Terminated	
Belgium	Brussels	Brussels Airport	Terminated	
Bulgaria	Burgas	Burgas Airport	Seasonal	
Bulgaria	Varna	Varna Airport	Seasonal	
Cape Verde	Boa Vista	Aristides Pereira International Airport	Seasonal	
Cape Verde	Praia	Nelson Mandela International Airport		
Cape Verde	Sal	Amilcar Cabral International Airport		
Cape Verde	São Vicente	Cesária Évora Airport	Seasonal	
Croatia	Brač	Brač Airport		
Croatia	Dubrovnik	Dubrovnik Airport	Seasonal	
Croatia	Split	Split Airport	Terminated	
Croatia	Zadar	Zadar Airport	Seasonal	
Cyprus	Paphos	Paphos International Airport	Terminated	
Czech Republic	Prague	Václav Havel Airport Prague		
Denmark	Copenhagen	Copenhagen Airport		
Egypt	Hurghada	Hurghada International Airport		
Egypt	Marsa Alam	Marsa Alam International Airport		
Finland	Helsinki	Helsinki Airport		
Finland	Rovaniemi	Rovaniemi Airport	Terminated	
France	Ajaccio	Ajaccio Napoleon Bonaparte Airport	Seasonal	
France	Bastia	Bastia – Poretta Airport	Seasonal	
France	Biarritz	Biarritz Pays Basque Airport	Seasonal	
France	Bordeaux	Bordeaux–Mérignac Airport		
France	Calvi	Calvi – Sainte-Catherine Airport	Seasonal	
France	Châlons	Châlons Vatry Airport	Terminated	
France	Figari	Figari–Sud Corse Airport	Seasonal	
France	La Rochelle	La Rochelle – Île de Ré Airport	Terminated	
France	Marseille	Marseille Provence Airport	Terminated	
France	Montpellier	Montpellier–Méditerranée Airport		
France	Nantes	Nantes Atlantique Airport	Terminated	
France	Nice	Nice Côte d'Azur Airport		
France	Paris	Charles de Gaulle Airport		
France	Toulon	Toulon–Hyères Airports	Seasonal	
Germany	Berlin	Berlin Brandenburg Airport		
Germany	Berlin	Berlin Tegel Airport	Airport Closed	
Germany	Frankfurt	Frankfurt Airport	Terminated	
Germany	Hamburg	Hamburg Airport		
Germany	Heringsdorf	Heringsdorf Airport	Seasonal	
Germany	Munich	Munich Airport		
Germany	Rostock	Rostock–Laage Airport	Terminated	
Germany	Saarbrücken	Saarbrücken Airport	Terminated	
Germany	Sylt	Sylt Airport	Seasonal	
Greece	Athens	Athens International Airport	Terminated	
Greece	Chania	Chania International Airport		
Greece	Corfu	Corfu International Airport	Seasonal	
Greece	Heraklion	Heraklion International Airport	Seasonal	
Greece	Kos	Kos International Airport	Seasonal	
Greece	Mykonos	Mykonos Airport	Terminated	
Greece	Rhodes	Rhodes International Airport	Seasonal	
Greece	Santorini	Santorini International Airport	Seasonal	
Greece	Thessaloniki	Thessaloniki Airport	Seasonal	
Hungary	Budapest	Budapest Ferenc Liszt International Airport		
Iceland	Reykjavík	Keflavík International Airport	Terminated	
Ireland	Dublin	Dublin Airport		
Italy	Bari	Bari Karol Wojtyła Airport		
Italy	Bologna	Bologna Guglielmo Marconi Airport		
Italy	Brindisi	Brindisi Airport	Seasonal	
Italy	Cagliari	Cagliari Elmas Airport	Seasonal	
Italy	Catania	Catania–Fontanarossa Airport	Seasonal	
Italy	Florence	Florence Airport	Seasonal	
Italy	Lamezia Terme	Lamezia Terme International Airport	Seasonal	
Italy	Milan	Linate Airport		
Italy	Milan	Milan Malpensa Airport		
Italy	Naples	Naples International Airport	Seasonal	
Italy	Olbia	Olbia Costa Smeralda Airport	Seasonal	
Italy	Palermo	Falcone Borsellino Airport	Seasonal	
Italy	Pescara	Abruzzo Airport		
Italy	Rimini	Federico Fellini International Airport	Seasonal	
Italy	Rome	Rome Fiumicino Airport		
Italy	Turin	Turin Airport	Terminated	
Italy	Venice	Venice Marco Polo Airport		
Luxembourg	Luxembourg	Luxembourg Airport	Hub	
Malta	Luqa	Malta International Airport		
Montenegro	Podgorica	Podgorica Airport	Terminated	
Montenegro	Tivat	Tivat Airport	Seasonal	
Morocco	Agadir	Agadir–Al Massira Airport	Seasonal	
Morocco	Marrakesh	Marrakesh Menara Airport		
Netherlands	Amsterdam	Amsterdam Airport Schiphol	Terminated	
Netherlands	Rotterdam	Rotterdam The Hague Airport	Terminated	
Norway	Oslo	Oslo Gardermoen Airport		
Poland	Kraków	Kraków John Paul II International Airport		
Poland	Warsaw	Warsaw Chopin Airport		
Portugal	Faro	Faro Airport		
Portugal	Funchal	Madeira Airport		
Portugal	Lisbon	Lisbon Airport		
Portugal	Porto	Porto Airport		
Romania	Bucharest	Bucharest Henri Coandă International Airport		
Senegal	Dakar	Blaise Diagne International Airport	Seasonal	
Serbia	Belgrade	Belgrade Nikola Tesla Airport	Terminated	
South Africa	Johannesburg	O. R. Tambo International Airport	Terminated	
Spain	Alicante	Alicante–Elche Miguel Hernández Airport		
Spain	Almería	Almería Airport	Seasonal	
Spain	Barcelona	Josep Tarradellas Barcelona–El Prat Airport		
Spain	Bilbao	Bilbao Airport		
Spain	Fuerteventura	Fuerteventura Airport		
Spain	Girona	Girona Costa Brava Airport		
Spain	Ibiza	Ibiza Airport	Seasonal	
Spain	Jerez de la Frontera	Jerez Airport	Seasonal	
Spain	Lanzarote	Lanzarote Airport		
Spain	Las Palmas	Gran Canaria Airport		
Spain	Madrid	Adolfo Suárez Madrid–Barajas Airport		
Spain	Málaga	Málaga Airport		
Spain	Menorca	Menorca Airport	Seasonal	
Spain	Palma de Mallorca	Palma de Mallorca Airport		
Spain	Tenerife	Tenerife South Airport		
Spain	Valencia	Valencia Airport	Seasonal	
Sweden	Sälen/Trysil	Sälen/Scandinavian Mountains Airport	Terminated	
Sweden	Stockholm	Stockholm Arlanda Airport		
Switzerland	Geneva	Geneva Airport		
Switzerland	Zurich	Zurich Airport	Terminated	
Tunisia	Djerba	Djerba–Zarzis International Airport	Seasonal	
Tunisia	Enfidha	Enfidha–Hammamet International Airport		
Tunisia	Monastir	Monastir Habib Bourguiba International Airport		
Tunisia	Tunis	Tunis–Carthage International Airport		
Turkey	Antalya	Antalya Airport	Seasonal	
Turkey	Izmir	İzmir Adnan Menderes Airport		
United Arab Emirates	Dubai	Al Maktoum International Airport	Seasonal	
United Arab Emirates	Dubai	Dubai International Airport	Terminated	
United Arab Emirates	Ras Al Khaimah	Ras Al Khaimah International Airport	Terminated	
United Kingdom	Edinburgh	Edinburgh Airport		
United Kingdom	London	London City Airport		
United Kingdom	London	Heathrow Airport	Terminated	
United Kingdom	Manchester	Manchester Airport		
United States	New York City	John F. Kennedy International Airport	Terminated	

=== Codeshare agreements ===
Luxair has codeshare agreements with the following airlines:

- Air France
- Air Serbia
- Austrian Airlines
- ITA Airways
- LOT Polish Airlines
- Lufthansa
- Scandinavian Airlines
- TAP Air Portugal
- Turkish Airlines

== Fleet ==
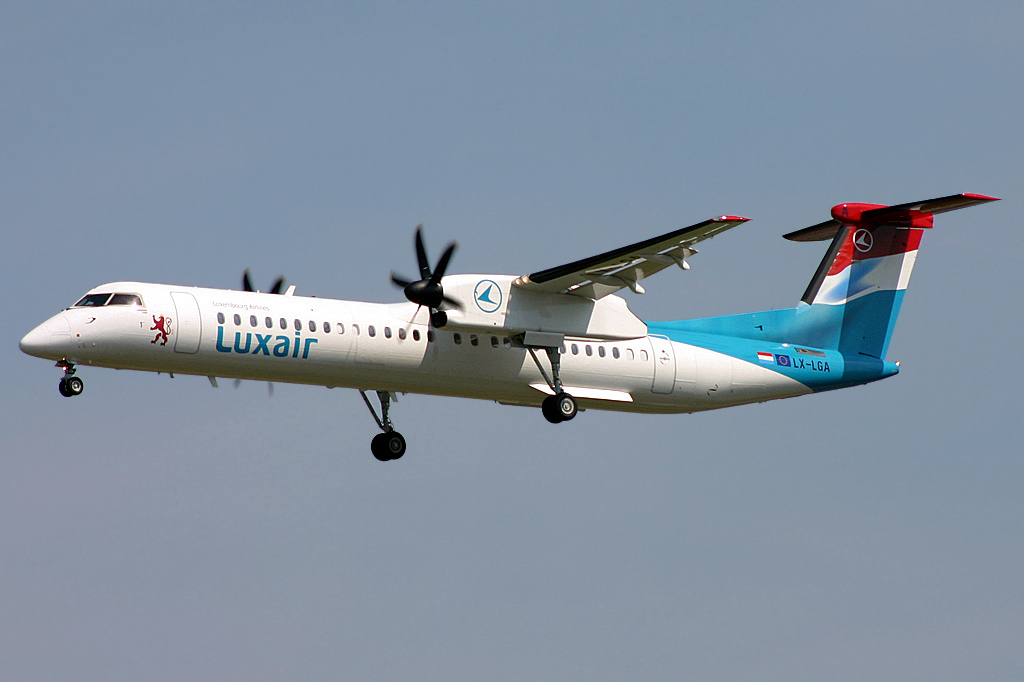
Luxair De Havilland Canada Dash 8-400

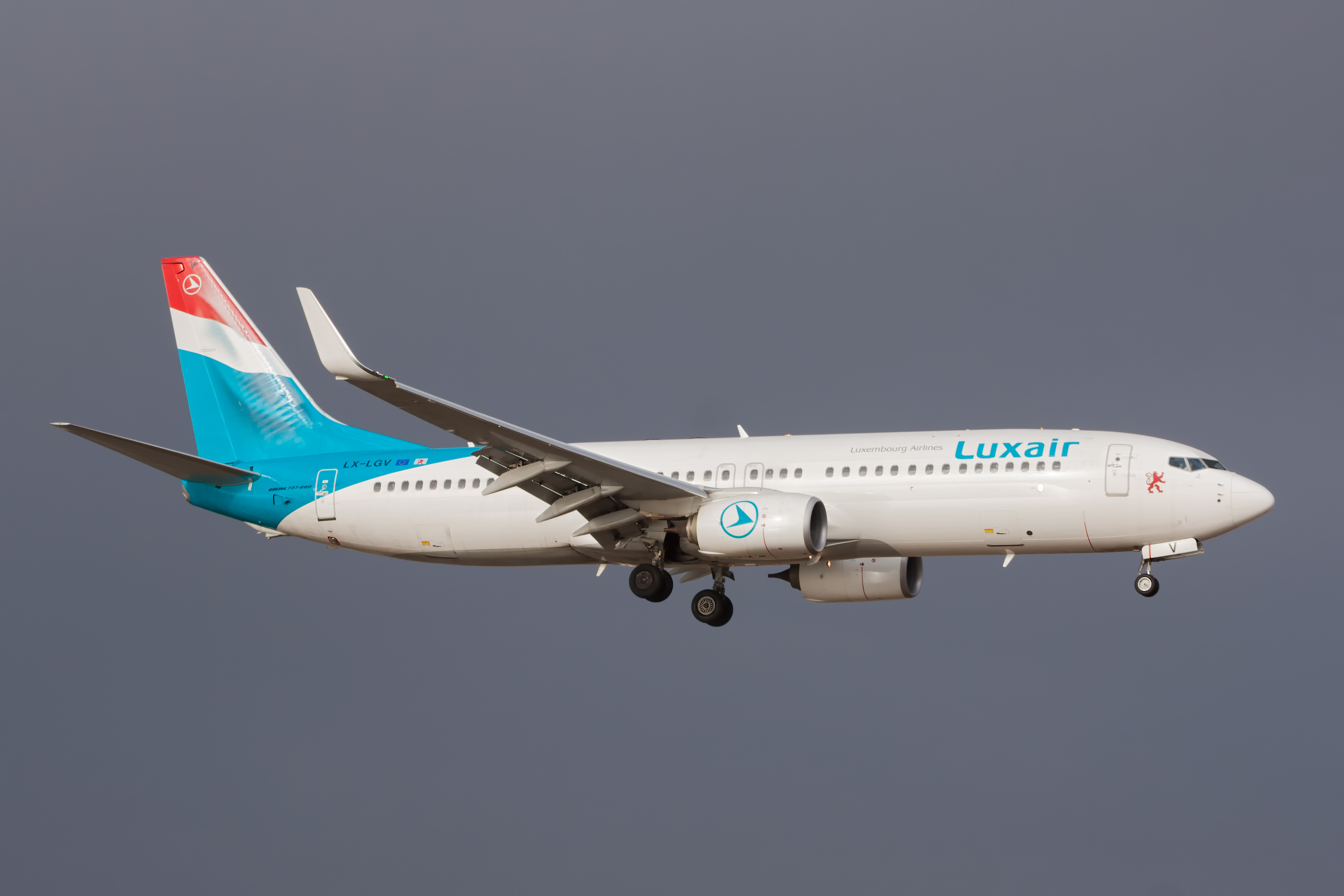
Luxair Boeing 737-800

=== Current fleet ===
As of July 2026, Luxair operates the following aircraft:

Luxair fleet
Aircraft	In service	Orders	Passengers	Notes
Boeing 737-700	3	—	141	
Boeing 737-800	4	—	186	
Boeing 737 MAX 8	2	8	186	2 to be leased.
Boeing 737 MAX 10	—	4	TBA	
De Havilland Canada Dash 8-400	10	—	76	
Embraer E190-E2	—	3	TBA	—
Embraer E195-E2	4	2	136	Order with 3 purchase rights. Deliveries from December 2025.
Total	23	17		

=== Former fleet ===
As of August 2025, Luxair operated 4 Boeing 737-700, 4 Boeing 737-800, 2 Boeing 737-8 MAX, 11 De Havilland Canada Dash 8-Q400 and 4 Embraer 195-E2.

Luxair previously operated the following aircraft types:

- Airbus A300B4-203
- Boeing 707
- Boeing 737-200
- Boeing 737-400
- Boeing 737-500
- Boeing 747SP
- Boeing 767-300ER (leased from CityBird)
- Bombardier CRJ700 (leased from Adria Airways)
- Embraer EMB 120 Brasilia
- Embraer ERJ-135
- Embraer ERJ-145
- Fokker F27 Friendship
- Fokker 50
- Lockheed L-1649A Starliner
- Sud Aviation Caravelle 6R
- Vickers Viscount

=== Special liveries ===
Starting from 2020, Luxair released special liveries for some of its aircraft. On 25 July 2021, the company introduced the SUMO Artwork Luxair's Boeing 737/800. The livery was designed by the local street artist Christian "SUMO" Pearson. The special livery was meant to spread a positive message at the moment of the restart of operations after the first COVID-19 lockdown and was the main action of the company's broader "FlyingIsAnArt" project: On 25 November 2020, the company released a de Havilland Q400 with an orange logo to raise awareness for violence against women.

In July 2022, Luxair was the world's first airline to paint a livery of one of its aircraft in a rainbow, to support Luxembourg Pride Month. This project inspired the German carrier Lufthansa, which one year later decided to do the same on one of its aircraft.

In October 2022, Luxair painted one of its aircraft with pink artwork by the local artist Lisa Junius in partnership with Think Pink Lux, to contribute to the Pink October worldwide campaign.

== Accidents and incidents ==
- On 22 December 1969, a Vickers Viscount (registration LX-LGC) arriving from Frankfurt Airport, Germany, landed 60% on the right-hand side of R24, hit a snowbank piled up by snowplows at the intersection with runway 20 during landing and rollout at Luxembourg Findel Airport in freezing fog weather. No passengers died, but the aircraft was damaged beyond repair. It was scrapped in May 1970.
- On 6 November 2002, Luxair Flight 9642, a Fokker 50 (registration LX-LGB) incoming from Berlin, Germany, crashed in a field near the village of Niederanven during its final approach to Luxembourg Findel Airport. Twenty passengers and two crew members died, including artist Michel Majerus. Only the pilot in command and one passenger survived. This is the only fatal accident in Luxair's history.
- On 30 September 2015, Luxair Flight 9562, operated by a Bombardier Q400, was taking off from Saarbrücken Airport when the first officer retracted the landing gear before the aircraft lifted off. The aircraft collapsed onto its belly and came to a stop on the runway. The aircraft was damaged beyond repair and Luxair ordered a replacement Q400 to be delivered in August 2016.
- On 4 February 2024, Luxair Flight 5682 flying between Ljubljana and Luxembourg was forced to land in Munich, after pilots reported a crack in their cockpit windshield. The Dash-8 plane was grounded for approximately 31 hours in Munich, repaired, and returned to Luxembourg.
