= Air Caraïbes Flight 1501 =

2001 aviation accident in Saint Barthélemy

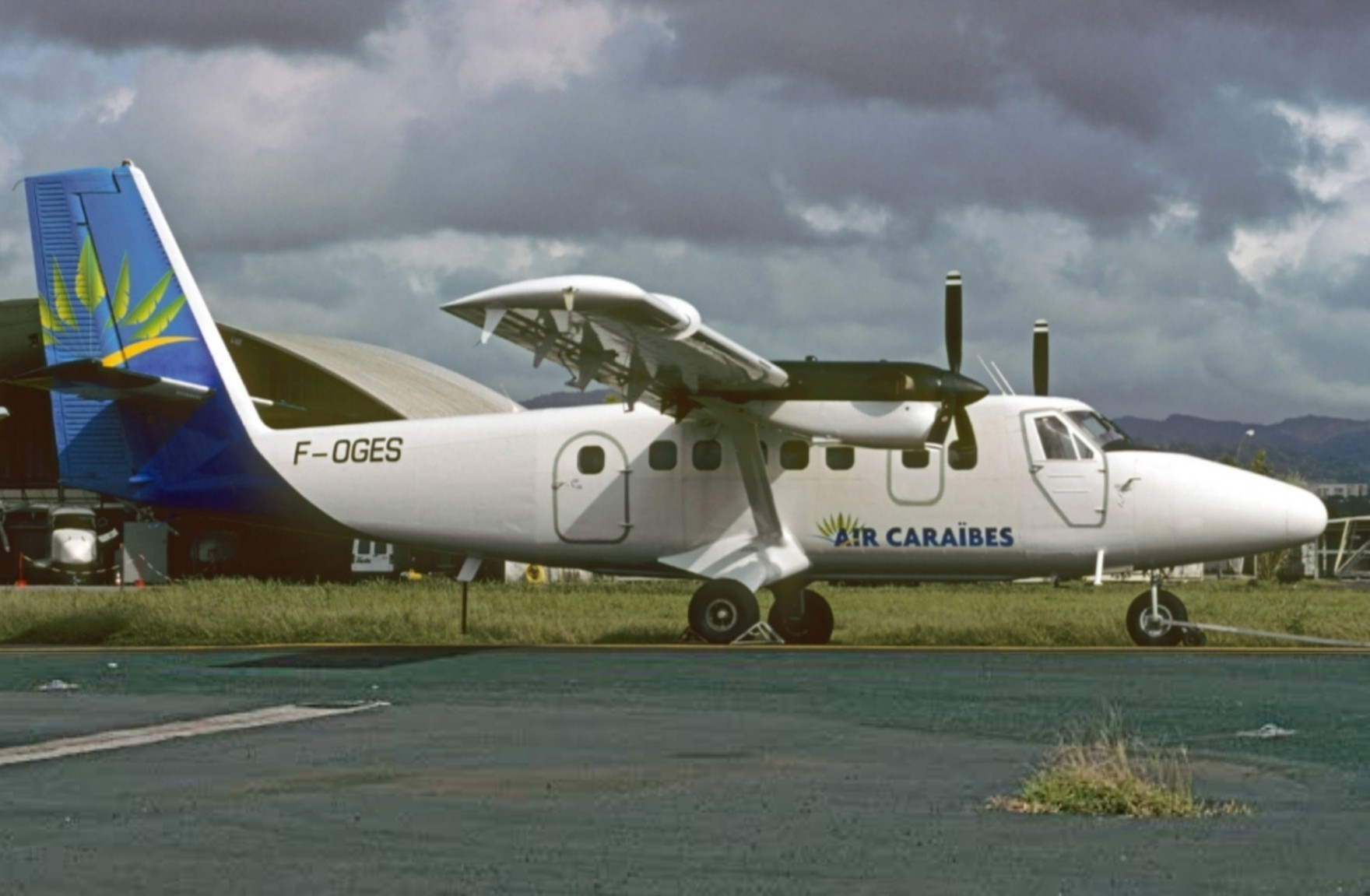
- F-OGES, the aircraft involved in the crash

Accident
- Date: 24 March 2001
- Summary: Thrust asymmetry caused by pilot error
- Site: Col de la Tourmente, District of Public-Corossol, Saint Barthélemy (Note: Up until 2007, Saint Barthélemy was a part of Guadeloupe until the island voted in favour of a secession in 2003. Subsequently, on 22 February 2007, the island officially became a separate Overseas Collectivity of France.); 17°54′22.5″N 62°51′07″W
- Total fatalities: 20
- Total injuries: 1

Aircraft
- Aircraft type: de Havilland Canada DHC-6-300 Twin Otter
- Operator: Air Caraïbes
- IATA flight No.: TX1501
- ICAO flight No.: FWI1501
- Call sign: FRENCH WEST 1501
- Registration: F-OGES
- Flight origin: Princess Juliana International Airport, Sint Maarten
- Destination: Gustaf III Airport, Saint Barthélemy
- Occupants: 19
- Passengers: 17
- Crew: 2
- Fatalities: 19
- Survivors: 0

Ground casualties
- Ground fatalities: 1
- Ground injuries: 1 (minor)

Air Caraïbes Flight 1501 (TX1501/FWI1501) was a scheduled international passenger flight, flying from Princess Juliana International Airport in the Dutch overseas territory of Sint Maarten to Saint Barthélemy Airport which was in the French overseas region of Guadeloupe at that time. The flight was operated by Air Caraïbes, a Caribbean regional airline, using a de Havilland Canada DHC-6-300 Twin Otter. On 24 March 2001, during an approach to Saint Barthélemy Airport, the DHC-6 Twin Otter banked steeply to the left and crashed into a house, killing all 19 passengers and crew on board. One person on the ground was also killed in the explosions that followed.

The crash was the third deadliest plane crash in Guadeloupe, behind Air France Flight 212 and Air France Flight 117, and was the 11th deadliest involving a Twin Otter.

Investigation by the French Bureau of Enquiry and Analysis for Civil Aviation Safety (or BEA) concluded that the cause of the crash was due to an error by the flight crew in managing the plane's thrust lever. During its final approach to Saint Barthélemy, the crew caused one of the aircraft's engines to reverse by moving the thrust lever back to the "beta" range, creating a thrust asymmetry which caused the aircraft to bank steeply to the left and crash.

According to the BEA, this was the first fatal accident in the Twin Otter whereby an accidental thrust selection caused a propeller to enter the Beta range. The investigation was hampered by the lack of a flight recorder on the plane. After the crash, the BEA made a mandatory recommendation to equip every transport plane with at least one flight recorder.

== Flight ==
=== Take-off and approach ===
Flight 1501 took off from Princess Juliana International Airport at 4:00 pm local time, using a visual flight rules (VFR) flight plan, and was expected to land in Saint Barthélemy at 4:15 pm. The distance between Saint Martin and Saint Barthélemy is approximately 19 nmi (35 km; 22 mi). The weather was reported as good, with calm winds and very good visibility.

The flight entered its cruise altitude of 1,500 ft (460 m) and the crew reported passing the "Pain de Sucre" waypoint for a final approach to runway 10 of Gustaf III Airport in the last transmission from Flight 1501.

=== Crash ===
While flying above the western slope of La Tourmente Pass, the aircraft suddenly banked steeply to the left. Numerous eyewitnesses including an Aerodrome Flight Information Service (AFIS) worker claimed that Flight 1501 then rapidly lost altitude and crashed onto a house, with a massive explosion following immediately after impact. Emergency services quickly arrived to the scene and cordoned off the area. All 19 people on board were killed instantly in the crash and an elderly man, identified as Augustin Questel, who lived in the house with his wife, died from the subsequent fire and explosion. His wife was alive but slightly injured and was taken to hospital.

== Aircraft ==
The aircraft involved was a de Havilland Canada DHC-6-300 Twin Otter, registered in France as F-OGES. The aircraft was equipped with two Pratt & Whitney Canada engines driving Hartzell propellers. It entered into service in 1970. It was subsequently sold to Air Caraïbes, where it entered service in 2001. The aircraft had accumulated more than 35,000 flying hours in 90,000 flight cycles with Air Caraïbes.

== Passengers and crew ==
According to Air Caraïbes CEO Philippe Chevallier and the company's local manager, most of the passengers were French tourists, 15 French residents of Paris, two local residents of Saint Barthélemy and one American. One of the crew members was a French national while other's nationality was not revealed. Multiple reports stated that one Dutch woman and two Belgians were also on board. The American was also reported to have dual nationality.

The captain (and pilot flying), identified by an Air Caraïbes' official as 38-year-old Jean-Paul Jerpan, obtained his commercial pilot license on 18 June 1987 and Instrument Rating on 3 November 1987. He obtained DHC-6 type rating on 28 November 1988 and was subsequently hired as a pilot by Air Guadeloupe and later transferred to Air Caraïbes. The Captain had acquired a total flying hours of 9,864 hours, of which 5,000 hours were on Twin Otters.

The co-pilot, 38-year-old First Officer Nicolas Manen, obtained his Twin Otter type rating on 21 December 2000, having had previous professional experience as a flight engineer in the French Air Force. According to the investigators, he was employed on a short-term contract, in which he was supposed to join another airline as a flight engineer. He had acquired a total flying hours of 670 hours of which 15 of them were on the DHC-6.

== Investigation ==
As the crash occurred within the French territory, the BEA was responsible for the investigation. The BEA sent two field investigators to the crash site and later sent four investigators to Pointe-à-Pitre on 25 March. As the aircraft was manufactured in Canada, the Canadian TSB joined the investigation with the assistance from Bombardier and Pratt and Whitney Canada. The American NTSB also joined the investigation and sent a representative.

According to Chevallier the aircraft was not equipped with a black box, and thus investigators had to rely on observations of air traffic controller recordings, eyewitnesses, wreckage observation and their best guess on what might have happened on Flight 1501. Soon after the crash, airport officials claimed it was caused by mechanical failure. One witness stated that he heard an engine "sputtering" before the aircraft slammed onto the house.

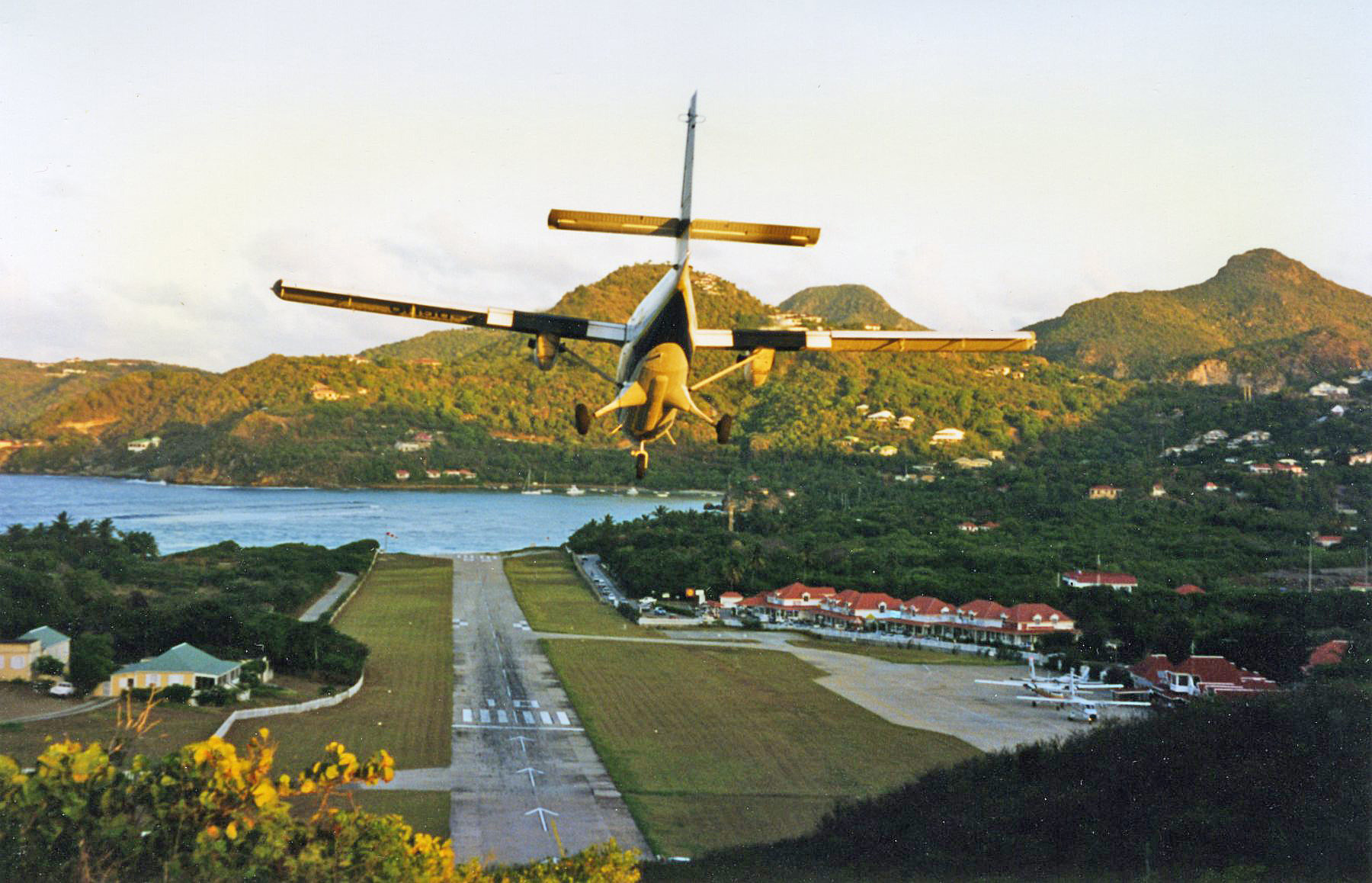
The Gustaf III Airport, which is surrounded by mountainous terrain, requires pilots to obtain a special certificate to land.

The western approach to Saint Barthélemy Airport crosses the Col de la Tourmente just before the runway, requiring pilots to have special certification to land there. Aircraft approaching the runway must make a steep descent and fly low over houses before landing, with no night flights and all aircraft to be equipped with radio.

During the first phase of the investigation, investigators inspected the wreckage of the plane. Initial examination revealed that there were no signs of abnormalities with the plane's controls. Inspection of the plane's propellers also revealed that both propellers were delivering significant power during the crash. Due to the severity of the impact, investigators could not take a fuel sample from the wreckage. During their inspection they found two video cameras at the crash site.

Closer observation of the plane's propellers revealed that the left propeller had a pitch setting of at least 20.4°, that is to say a pitch above flight idle. The right propeller had a different pitch setting for each of the blades, settings likely due to less-violent secondary impacts to the powerplant at the moment of impact. Consequently, the values noted were unusable.

=== Use of video footage in the investigation ===
The recovery of video from the crash site had the potential to significantly assist the investigation. One of the two video cameras was too badly damaged by the impact to provide a recoverable recording. However, the second was less damaged and its footage was recovered except for some portions including that adjacent to the recording head.

This video had been taken by a passenger on Flight 1501 filming through a left-side window in the few minutes before the accident. Investigators reviewed the three main sequences of the flight: initial climb, cruise and approach.

Later, investigators analysed the video more thoroughly to examine the operation of both propeller visually and through the sound recorded on the tape. During Flight 1501's initial climb and cruise there were no abnormalities in the sound of the propeller. However, investigators detected an abnormality during the approach phase, with audible fluctuations indicating that both propellers were "not synchronized".

=== Flights observation and footage comparison ===
Investigators then recorded new video footage, using the same model of video camera as the one recovered, during a recreation of the flight to evaluate the track, engine parameters and the pilot's hand positions. The thrust lever of the DHC-6 was located on the cockpit ceiling and investigators wanted to determine if the pilot's hand position may have contributed to the crash.

It was revealed that, when the pilot flying was seated on the left, his right forearm is located in the extended vertical axis of the levers, a position which is favorable to symmetric handling. However, when the pilot flying is seated in the right seat, his left forearm is not vertical; he stretches slightly to the left and is thus not aligned with the axis of the levers, this "angle" being compensated by wrist movement. In addition, if the pilot flying was seated on the right, he would move the thrust lever with a different timing, used short successive and separate movements on the engine No. 1 lever and then on the engine No. 2 lever, with the hand always remaining in contact with both levers.

A comparison was made by investigators to confirm the position of Flight 1501. An analysis of the engine parameters also showed that both engines were functioning normally from take-off until the last image of the video, recorded just minutes before the accident. Towards the end of the film, the spectral analysis showed an increase in the propeller speed. This variation seems to correspond to the beginning of the descent towards the airport, at the moment when the crew selected the propellers' full low pitch position.

=== Thrust lever beta ===
In the DHC-6, there is a mode called as "beta" in which the crew can control the propeller pitch directly. There are two beta ranges. The first is from + 17° to + 11°, called "approach beta" and permitted in flight. In this range the propellers are tractive. The second range runs from + 11° to − 15°, called "reverse beta" and prohibited in flight. In this range, the propellers act as brakes, two different sub-ranges being identifiable: ground idle and traction reversal. If the reverse beta is engaged in mid-air, according to the manufacturer, this would greatly increase aerodynamic drag and cause rapid deceleration. As a consequence, the plane would lose lift.

The manufacturer had known about this risk since 1979 and had started to implement several preventive measures. They had warned pilots about the risk in all flight manuals. They had installed a mechanical stop to try to prevent a pilot accidentally causing a plane to enter the beta range. An alarm had also been installed by the manufacturer.

=== Investigators' hypotheses ===
Investigators made several hypotheses about Flight 1501. Mechanical failure, terrorism, bird strike and weather-related factors were quickly ruled out. They then focused their attention on two strong hypotheses.

The first hypothesis was that the pilot flying was the captain and that he had accidentally selected the reverse beta range for the propellers with the intention of losing energy to correct the airspeed, regain the descent path or shorten the landing as much as possible, as the reverse beta mode acted as a powerful brake. During that time, a thrust asymmetry occurred, which could have caused an undesirable behavior or caused the plane to reach its desired speed. In either case, it would be necessary at that moment to deselect the reverse beta range. Then the pilot would have pushed the levers energetically back to their normal use range by increasing thrust, which would explain the change in engine noise. Asymmetry in the power levers' movement, or in the operation of the propeller mechanism, or even in the position of the propeller levers, would then have led to asymmetry between the engines to an extent that would have caused a violent yaw movement, inducing a sharp roll to the left, possibly associated with a stall of the left wing and then a dive. The pilot would not have been able to regain control of the aircraft, which would have been both too slow and too near the ground at that moment. This hypothesis was supported by testimonies from numerous eyewitnesses and routine in-flight procedure violations in the airport.

The second one was that the pilot flying was the co-pilot. One day before the crash the co-pilot had performed a take-off from Saint Barthélemy. The captain, who was more experienced than the co-pilot, ordered the co-pilot to conduct the approach, without himself taking over radio communications with the tower. The co-pilot was seated on the right, where it was not easy to control the thrust lever.

According to the investigators neither hypothesis could be excluded as there were no flight recorders to provide confirmation. Investigators did state they believed that the first hypothesis was far more probable, based on testimonies of eyewitnesses, and concluded that the most probable cause of the crash was due to the selection of the reverse beta range.

=== Conclusion ===
Investigators then made the conclusion of the cause of the crash:

The accident appears to result from the captain's use of the propellers in the reverse beta range to improve control of his track on short final. A strong thrust asymmetry at the moment when coming out of the reverse beta range would have caused the loss of yaw control, then roll control of the aircraft.

The investigation could not exclude three other hypotheses were nevertheless classified as quite unlikely:

- A loss of control during a go-around.
- A loss of control due to a stall.
- A loss of control due to sudden incapacitation of one of the pilots.

The captain's lack of recent experience on this airplane type, the undeniable difficulty of conducting an approach to runway 10 at Saint-Barthélemy and the pressure of time during this flight were contributory factors.

The low height at which the loss of control occurred was an aggravating factor.

=== The absence of flight recorders ===
The investigation was hampered due to the absence of a cockpit voice recorder and a flight data recorder. BEA made a statement:

It is regrettable that the absence of flight recorders on the aircraft made it impossible to make a rapid determination of the conditions of the last minutes of the flight. More than ten years after the publication of the regulation of 5 November 1987, the waivers granted for older aircraft no longer appear to be justified.

After the crash, the BEA made mandatory recommendations to the Directorate General for Civil Aviation and the Joint Aviation Authorities to equip every public transport plane authorized to carry more than nine passengers and whose maximum certified take-off weight is less than or equal to 5,700 kg, with at least one flight recorder. The BEA stated that the recommendation should be implemented as soon as possible and should also apply to cargo planes and helicopters.

== Aftermath ==
=== Immediate response ===
The prefect of Guadeloupe immediately went to the scene to organize relief, including gendarmerie reinforcements, firemen and teams of psychologists.

French President Jacques Chirac sent a message of condolences to the families of the victims. On 25 March, Prime Minister Lionel Jospin and Foreign Secretary Christian Paul also expressed their "emotion" and "deep sadness" to the families of the victims.

A prayer service was held in Gustavia, the island's most important town, on 25 March. Public opinion in Saint Barthélemy supported Mayor Bruno Magras's declaration of Monday 26 March as a day of official mourning for the crash victims. Schools, public services and most businesses were closed. Air Caraïbes General Manager Philippe Chevallier announced that the airline would fly relatives of the victims to the crash site.

=== Lawsuit ===
A hearing on the crash was opened at the Correctional Court of Basse-Terre in Guadeloupe on 29 June 2006 and lasted two days. The case stated that there were alleged criminal offences. Richard Degryse, responsible for Air Caraïbes' training at the time of the events, was charged with involuntary manslaughter. Jean-Paul Dubreuil, Air Caraïbes' president, was also charged with manslaughter.

Twenty-one members of the Association of Families of Victims, ADFV, chaired by Karine Paris, arrived in Guadeloupe along with three lawyers engaged by the National Federation of Victims of Collective Accidents. Other civil parties also attended the trial, including members of the Questel family.

On 15 September 2006, Richard Degryse was convicted of involuntary homicide and sentenced to a two-year prohibition from any work involving directing flight operations. The sentence was much lower than the prosecutor's demand for a two-year suspended prison sentence with a five-year ban. Subsequently, the airline, Air Caraïbes, was also found guilty and fined 250,000 euros. The court determined that the operations manager and the company knew of the risks they had created by failing to comply with the training flight requirement for a pilot taking control of an aircraft after a break of more than 90 days. The court also received representations from more than 70 parties whose interests were examined during a civil lawsuit, held on 22 December at the tribunal of Basse-Terre.

== See also ==
In several other crashes, pilots have accidentally moved the aircraft's propeller switch into reverse pitch while still in mid-air:

- Luxair Flight 9642, a 2002 crash in Luxembourg involving the Fokker 50
- Kish Air Flight 7170, a 2004 crash in the United Arab Emirates involving the Fokker 50
- Merpati Nusantara Airlines Flight 6517, a 2013 crash in Indonesia involving the Xian MA60

Other aircraft crashes have been hampered due to the absence of flight recorders:

- Northwest Airlink Flight 2268, a 1987 plane crash in United States involving a CASA C-212
