= Administration for Technical Investigations =

The Administration for Technical Investigations (French: Administration des Enquêtes Techniques, AET) is a division of the Luxembourgish Ministry of Transport that investigates air, rail, river, and maritime accidents. The agency has its headquarters in Luxembourg City.

The agency investigated the crash of Luxair Flight 9642.

== See also ==
- Direction de l'Aviation Civile
