= Direction de l'Aviation Civile =

Luxembourgish Directorate of Civil Aviation
- Direktioun vun de Civilaviatioun; Direction de l'Aviation Civile

- DAC headquarters

Agency overview
- Formed: 1999; 27 years ago
- Jurisdiction: Luxembourg
- Headquarters: 4, rue Lou Hemmer, L-1748 Luxembourg (Findel)
- Agency executive: Laura Könner, Director
- Parent agency: Ministry for Mobility and Public Works
- Website: dac.gouvernement.lu/en.html/

The Direction de l'Aviation Civile (DAC) (also known as the Direktioun vun de Civilaviatioun in Luxembourgish) is a government agency of Luxembourg, headquartered in Senningerberg, Luxembourg.

The law of 19 May 1999 created the DAC.

== See also ==
- Administration for Technical Investigations
