= Luxembourg Airport =

Main airport in Luxembourg

Luxembourg Airport Fluchhafe Lëtzebuerg

- IATA: LUX; ICAO: ELLX

Summary
- Airport type: Public
- Operator: Société de l'Aéroport de Luxembourg S.A.
- Serves: Luxembourg City, Luxembourg
- Location: Niederanven
- Hub for: Cargolux; China Airlines Cargo; Luxair; Luxembourg Air Rescue
- Elevation AMSL: 1,234 ft (376 m)
- Coordinates: 49°37′24″N 006°12′16″E
- Website: lux-airport.lu

Maps
- Airport diagram (2024)

- Location in Luxembourg LUX/ELLX (Europe)

Runways
Direction	Length		Surface
Direction	m	ft	Surface
06/24	4,002	13,130	Asphalt

Statistics (2024)
- Movements: 92,000
- Passengers: 5,147,854
- Cargo: 905,222 tons
- Sources: Belgian AIP at Belgocontrol; Statistics from Eurostat

Luxembourg Airport (IATA: LUX, ICAO: ELLX) serves as the principal airport of Luxembourg and the sole international airport within the country. Formerly known as Luxembourg Findel Airport (French: Aéroport de Luxembourg-Findel) due to its location in the Findel area, it remains the only airport in Luxembourg equipped with a paved runway. The airport is approximately 3.25 nautical miles (6.02 km; 3.74 mi) to the east of Luxembourg City.

In 2024, Luxembourg Airport accommodated over five million passengers. Additionally, it is recognized as a major cargo hub, ranking as the fifth-busiest airport in Europe by cargo tonnage and ranking the 28th-busiest globally in 2010. Both Luxair, the national flag carrier, and Cargolux, a leading cargo airline, maintain their headquarters on the airport premises.

The airport handles around 100,000 aircraft movements per year on a single runway, which is relatively high for an airport with this infrastructure.

== History ==
=== Foundation and early years ===
The airport was originally known as "Sandweiler Airport", and was opened in the 1930s as a small grass airfield with a relatively short, 3,400 ft (1,000 m) runway.

Neutral Luxembourg was invaded by Germany on 10 May 1940, and on 21 May the Luftwaffe assigned Jagdgeschwader 53 (JG 53), a Messerschmitt Bf 109 fighter unit, to the airport. JG 53 was engaged in combat against the French and British Expeditionary Force in France during the Battle of France in May and June. In addition, Jagdgeschwader 52 (JG 52) operated Bf 109s from Sandweiler during the Blitzkrieg. JG 52 moved into France on 29 May but JG 53 remained in Luxembourg until 18 August when it moved closer to the English Channel to take part in the Battle of Britain.

Sandweiler Airport then remained unused by the Luftwaffe until September 1944, when Aufklärungsgruppe 123 (AKG 123), a reconnaissance unit which flew the Henschel Hs 126, a two-seat reconnaissance and observation aircraft, was assigned to the airport. AKG 123 moved east into Germany after only a few days when the United States Army moved through Luxembourg and cleared the country of the occupying German forces.

United States Army combat engineers arrived at Sandweiler in mid September 1944 and performed some minor reconstruction to prepare the airfield for Ninth Air Force combat aircraft. The airfield was designated as Advanced Landing Ground "A-97" Sandweiler and was opened on 18 September 1944. The Ninth Air Force 363rd Tactical Reconnaissance Group operated a variety of photo-reconnaissance aircraft until 29 October 1944 when they also moved east into Germany.

Sandweiler Airport was used by the Americans for the rest of the war as a transport supply airfield and also to evacuate combat casualties to the UK. It was returned to Luxembourgish control on 15 August 1945.

=== 1950-1999 ===
In 1955, Luxembourg Airport became the continental European hub for Icelandic low-cost airline Loftleiðir, that operated cheap transatlantic flights from the US via Reykjavik-Keflavik to Luxembourg, offering many young Americans a cheap way of travel to Europe, dubbed "Hippie Express". After Loftleiðir merged with another Icelandic airline - Flugfelag Islands, to create a new airline named Icelandair, it inherited Loftleiðir's Luxembourg hub and continued to operate flights there, as Luxembourg was relatively more liberal on the fifth freedom of the air. However, falling passenger numbers led to Icelandair dropping the Luxembourg hub in favor of a decentralized European network in the late 1990s, ending flights to Luxembourg from 9 January 1999.

In March 1999, Luxair launched direct flights to Newark using a Boeing 767, terminating them after only seven months of operations.

=== Development since the 2000s ===
In 2002, TAROM routed its flight from Bucharest to New York through Luxembourg in an attempt to increase the number of passengers.

Luxembourg Airport has constructed a high-security zone far away from most airport activities in order to attract the business of transporting valuable goods such as art and jewels. According to Hiscox, there is a "massive demand" for such a hub for precious cargo. Planes taxi away from main airport facilities before loading.

In 2015, the airline with the largest share of the airport's total passenger volume was still Luxair with 1.69 million passengers at a 63% share. Luxembourg Airport was closed to all passenger traffic for a week from 23 to 29 March 2020 as a public health measure during the COVID-19 pandemic.

In December 2023, China Southern Airlines began service to Zhengzhou.

=== Claims of linguistic discrimination ===
In 2021, it was announced that public announcements in Luxembourgish (and in German as well) at Luxembourg Airport would cease after many decades of use; it would only be using French and English for future public announcements. Actioun Lëtzebuergesch declared itself to be hugely upset by this new governmental measure, citing that other airports in the world seem to have no problems making public announcements in multiple languages; according to a poll conducted by AL, 92.84% of people in Luxembourg wished to have public announcements to be made in Luxembourgish at Luxembourg Airport. All written signs at Luxembourg Airport are only in French and English. This non-use of Luxembourgish and German (two official languages of Luxembourg) have fueled claims of linguistic discrimination, some pointing out that other airports seem to have no difficulties using up to 4 different languages in written signs.

== Terminals ==
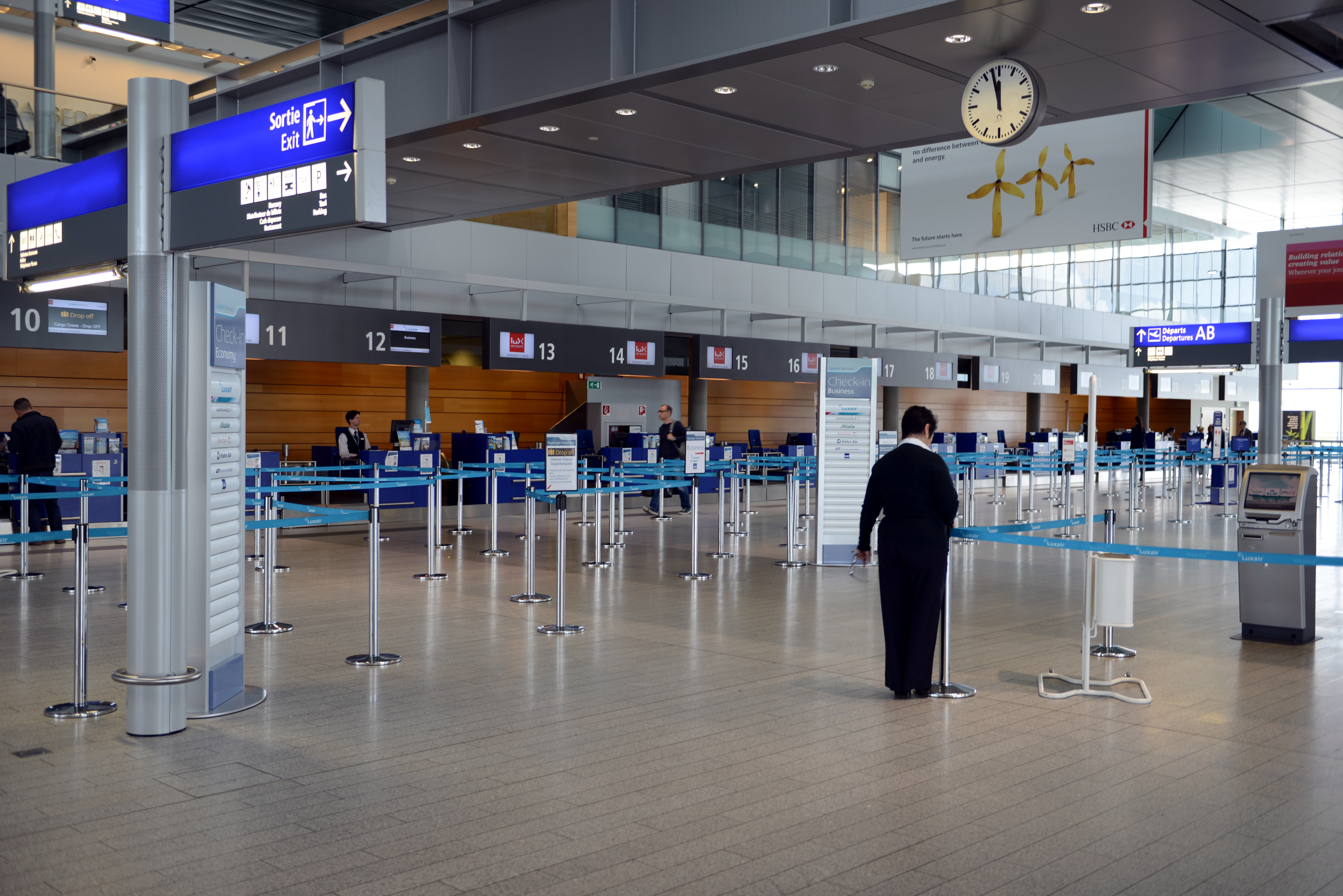
Terminal interior

=== Terminal A ===
Built in 1975, the building was the only terminal of the airport for 30 years, until terminal B opened in 2004. The terminal was getting overcrowded especially during the summer period, and only contained four shops, a post office and a restaurant. The terminal started to be demolished at the end of 2011 and was complete by March 2012; this was to make way for a footbridge connecting terminal B to the new terminal A. Construction of the new Terminal A started in 2005 and it was inaugurated in May 2008.

=== Terminal B ===
Terminal B opened in 2004. The building is unique as it only has gates and no check-in counters or arrivals hall. It was built for small planes with a maximum capacity of 50 people. It can handle up to 600,000 passengers a year. The Terminal reopened in the summer of 2017 after some arrangements to handle aircraft with a capacity of up to 110 passengers and a total of 1 million passengers annually.

== Airlines and destinations ==
=== Passenger ===
The following airlines operate regular scheduled and charter flights at Luxembourg Airport:

Airlines	Destinations
Aegean Airlines	Athens
Air Dolomiti	Frankfurt, Munich
British Airways	London–Heathrow
China Southern Airlines	Guangzhou, Zhengzhou
easyJet	Lisbon, Milan–Linate, Naples, Porto
Etihad Airways	Abu Dhabi
Finnair	Helsinki
GP Aviation	Pristina
KLM	Amsterdam
LOT Polish Airlines	Warsaw–Chopin
Lufthansa	Frankfurt, Munich
Luxair	Agadir, Alicante, Barcelona, Bari, Berlin, Bucharest–Otopeni, Budapest, Copenhagen, Djerba, Dublin, Edinburgh, Enfidha, Faro, Fuerteventura, Funchal, Geneva, Gran Canaria, Hamburg, Helsinki, Hurghada, Kraków, Lanzarote, Lisbon, London–City, Madrid, Málaga, Malta, Manchester, Marsa Alam, Milan–Linate, Milan–Malpensa, Monastir, Munich, Nice, Oslo, Palma de Mallorca, Paris–Charles de Gaulle, Pescara, Porto, Prague, Rome–Fiumicino, Sal, Stockholm–Arlanda, Tenerife–South, Tirana (begins 29 March 2027), Valencia, Venice, Vienna; Seasonal: Ajaccio, Almería, Antalya, Bastia, Biarritz, Bilbao, Boa Vista, Bologna, Bordeaux, Brač, Brindisi, Burgas, Cagliari, Calvi, Catania, Chania, Corfu, Dakar–Diass, Dubai–Al Maktoum, Dubrovnik, Figari, Florence, Girona, Heraklion, Heringsdorf, Ibiza, İzmir, Jerez de la Frontera, Kos, Lamezia Terme, Ljubljana, Marrakesh, Menorca, Montpellier, Naples, Olbia, Palermo, Patras, Porto Santo, Praia, Rhodes, Rimini, Salerno, Santorini, São Vicente, Sylt, Thessaloniki, Tivat, Toulon, Tunis, Varna, Zadar, Zakynthos
Ryanair	Barcelona, Bergamo, Dublin, Lisbon, London–Stansted, Madrid, Malta, Marseille, Porto; Seasonal: Faro, Palma de Mallorca, Seville
Scandinavian Airlines	Copenhagen
Swiss International Air Lines	Zürich
TAP Air Portugal	Lisbon
Turkish Airlines	Istanbul
United Airlines	Newark (begins 3 April 2027)
Volotea	Nice; Seasonal: Alicante, Toulouse

=== Cargo ===
Airlines	Destinations
Atlas Air	Huntsville, Jinan, Nottingham, Zhengzhou,
Cargolux	Amman, Amsterdam, Ashgabat, Astana, Atlanta, Bahrain, Baku, Bangkok–Suvarnabhumi, Beijing–Capital, Budapest, Calgary, Chicago–O'Hare, Curitiba, Dallas/Fort Worth, Dammam, Doha, Dubai, Glasgow–Prestwick, Guadalajara, Hanoi, Ho Chi Minh City, Hong Kong, Houston–Intercontinental, Indianapolis, Jakarta–Soekarno-Hatta, Johannesburg–O.R. Tambo, Komatsu, Kuala Lumpur–International, Kuwait City, London–Stansted, Los Angeles, Mexico City, Miami, Milan–Malpensa, Muscat, Nairobi–Jomo Kenyatta, New York–JFK, Penang, Quito, Rio de Janeiro, Riyadh, San Juan, Sao Paulo, Seattle/Tacoma, Seoul–Incheon, Shanghai–Pudong, Singapore, Taipei–Taoyuan, Tbilisi, Tokyo–Narita, Xiamen, Zhengzhou
China Airlines Cargo	Delhi, Taipei–Taoyuan
China Postal Airlines	Guangzhou, Nanjing, Zhengzhou
Silk Way Airlines	Baku, Chicago

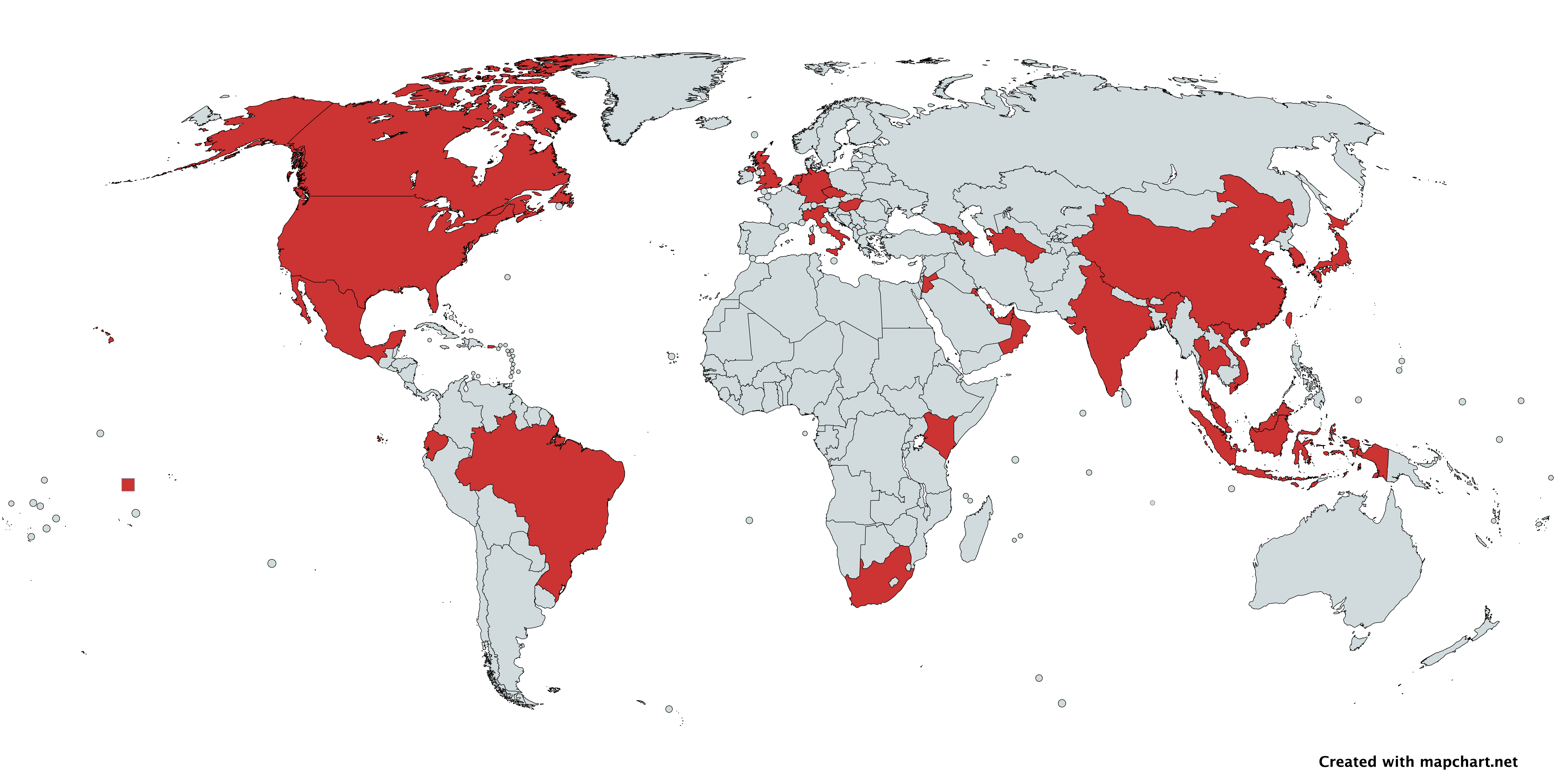
Luxembourg Airport cargo destinations

== Statistics ==
=== Routes ===
Busiest Routes from Luxembourg Airport (2024)
Rank	Airport	Passengers 2024
1	Porto Airport	492,122
2	Lisbon Airport	351,297
3	Frankfurt Airport	230,582
4	Amsterdam Airport	182,929
5	Palma de Mallorca Airport	175,860

=== Passengers ===
Passengers
1950	1960	1970	1980	1990	1995	2000	2005	2010	2012	2014	2016	2018	2019	2020	2021	2022	2023
6,525	55,591	476,938	670,159	1,072,264	1,267,640	1,669,484	1,573,825	1,630,027	1,919,694	2,467,864	3,022,918	4,036,878	4,416,038	1,425,715	2,002,903	4,055,900	4,791,916

=== Traffic ===
Movements, freight and night flights
	1990	1995	2000	2005	2010	2012	2014	2016	2018	2019	2020
International movements	39,738	46,586	61,189	65,446	57,537	59,785	62,260	69,577	79,101	80,557	43,635
Local movements	22,976	24,912	24,322	24,211	22,957	21,378	21,962	16,825	15,485	14,428	21,066
Freight (kg)	142,956,417	286,380,935	499,910,851	742,341,598	705,079,728	614,904,815	708,077,753	801,807,232	894,648,866	853,354,139	905,222,594
Night flights		764	886	1,069	1,550	1,256	1,554	1,991	2,145	1,951	1,420

Movements by airplane category
	1950	1955	1960	1965	1970	1975	1980	1985	1990	1995	2000	2005	2010	2015	2019	2020
0-2t Propeller	2,656	8,569	9,796	8,744	14,174	33,657	36,415	39,325	29,015	28,386	28,468	25,119	23,481	22,346	16,472	20,339
2-5t Propeller	338	136	313	1,553	982	1,794	1,802	1,549	1,919	2,028	1,955	5,834	5,158	4,167	3,932	5,170
>5t Propeller	608	2,688	4,016	6,853	7,927	6,945	7,554	12,266	18,043	22,660	19,536	7,581	11,034	14,817	21,862	9,173
Jet				390	2,952	6,683	8,833	9,271	13,737	16,588	35,552	51,123	40,821	43,701	52,719	30,020

== Ground transportation ==
=== Road ===
The airport is served by junction 9 of the A1 motorway (Luxembourg City - Trier).

=== Bus ===
The airport is connected via public bus routes 6, 16, and 29 to Luxembourg City, and regional bus line 302 to Trier, Germany.

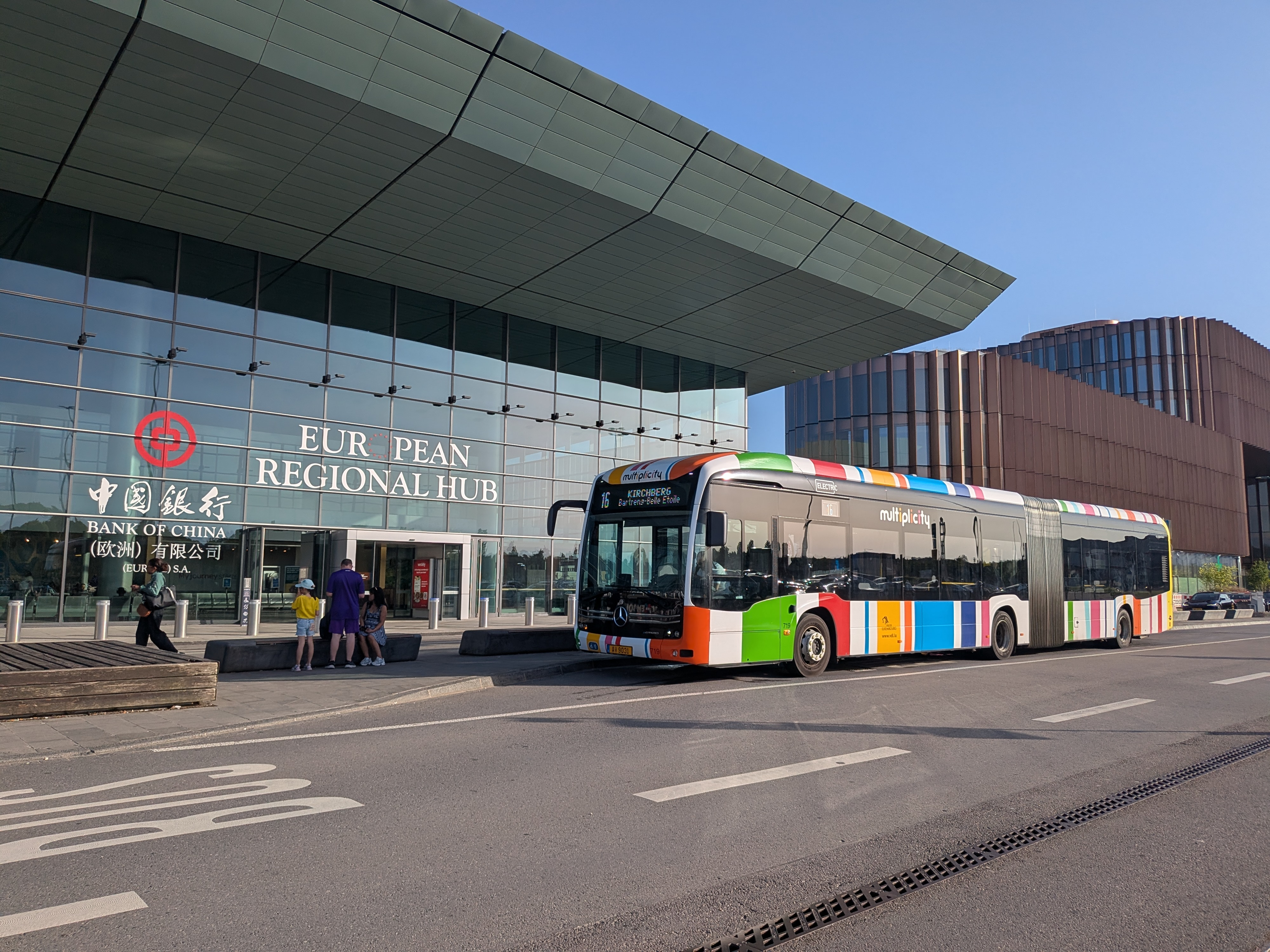
VDL Bus 719 (AV 9031), a 18m Mercedes-Benz eCitaro, picking up passengers in front of the airport terminal

=== Tram ===
The airport is home to the northern terminus of Line 1 of the Luxembourg City tramway, with the extension from Kirchberg that opened in March 2025.

=== Rail ===
In 2003, the Chamber of Deputies approved then-Minister of Transportation Henri Grethen's project to link the airport to the central train station via Kirchberg by a mostly underground railway connection.

In 2008, a rail tunnel under the airport was built, following the construction of Terminal A. Due to budgetary constraints the project was shelved in 2009, with the tunnel remaining vacant since.

== Accidents and incidents ==
- On 22 December 1969, Vickers Viscount LX-LGC of Luxair was damaged beyond economic repair when it ran off the runway and the nose wheel collapsed.
- On 29 September 1982, Aeroflot Flight 343 ran off the runway on landing.
- On 6 November 2002, Luxair Flight 9642, Fokker 50 (registration LX-LGB) from Berlin, Germany crashed in a field near the village of Niederanven during its final approach. 20 passengers and crew were killed.
- On 21 January 2010, Cargolux Flight 7933, a Boeing 747-4R7F flying from Hong Kong to Luxembourg via Azerbaijan and Spain, collided with a van while attempting to land on runway 24. The aircraft suffered minor damage while the van sustained substantial damage with the driver only sustaining minor injuries. A subsequent investigation determined that the incident was the result of a chain of multiple errors and a lack of technical equipment, which could have prevented the collision.
- On 15 April 2023, Cargolux Flight 7545, a Boeing 747-4HQFER registered as LX-ECV, suffered damage after a hard landing during a flight from Dubai's Al Maktoum International Airport. The airplane landed hard on its left wing, then did a go-around before landing, with damage to their number 2, or left wing's inner, engine. No one was injured in the incident.
- On 14 May 2023, Cargolux Flight 6857, a Boeing 747-4R7F registered as LX-OCV, crash landed at the airport a short while after taking off; the landing gear would not retract after take off and the decision was made to land the aircraft. The main landing gear separated from the aircraft during landing.

== See also ==
- World's busiest airports by cargo traffic
- Advanced Landing Ground
- Luxembourg Freeport
