= Kish Air Flight 7170 =

2004 aviation accident

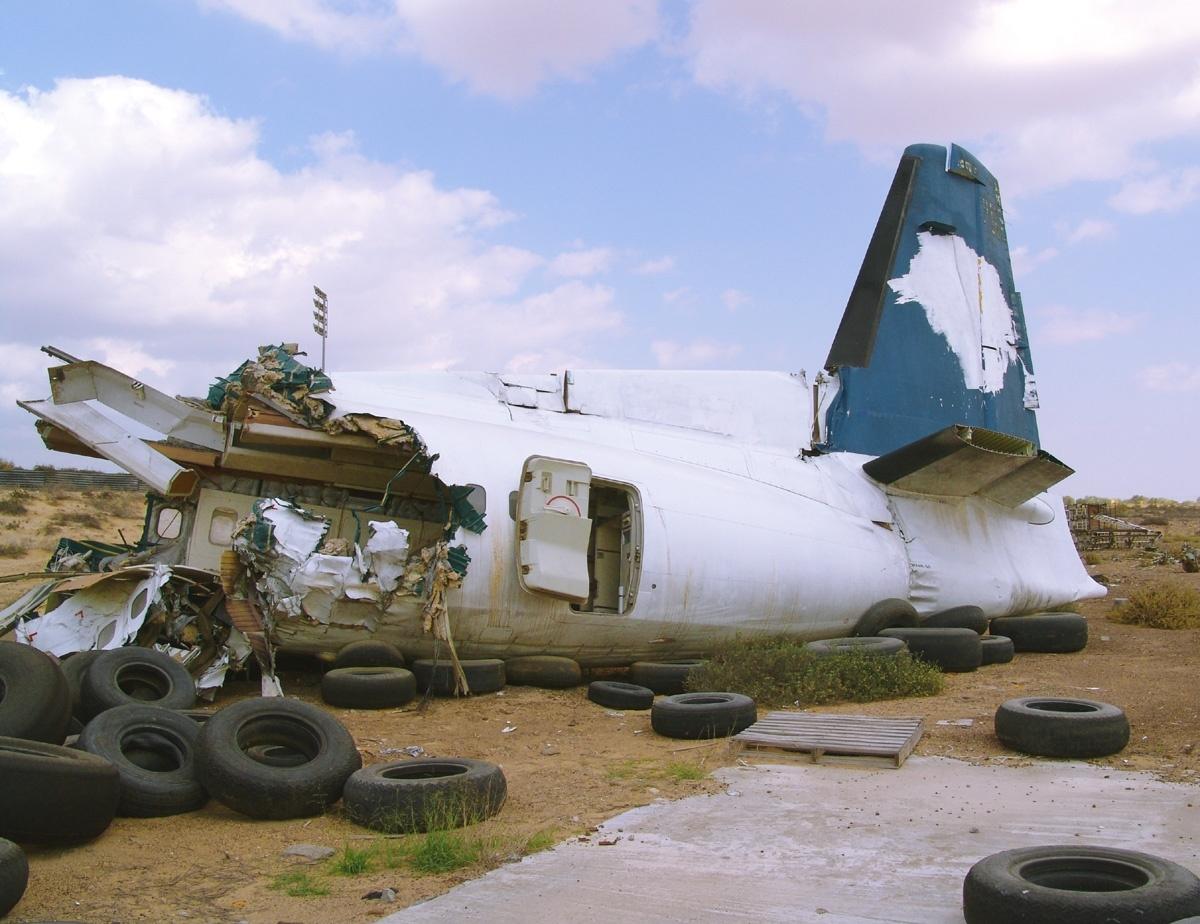
- The remains of Kish Air Flight 7170, one year after the crash

Accident
- Date: 10 February 2004
- Summary: Thrust reversers engaged due to pilot error
- Site: Al Muwafjah, near Sharjah International Airport, Sharjah, United Arab Emirates; 25°21.35′N 55°28.63′E

Aircraft
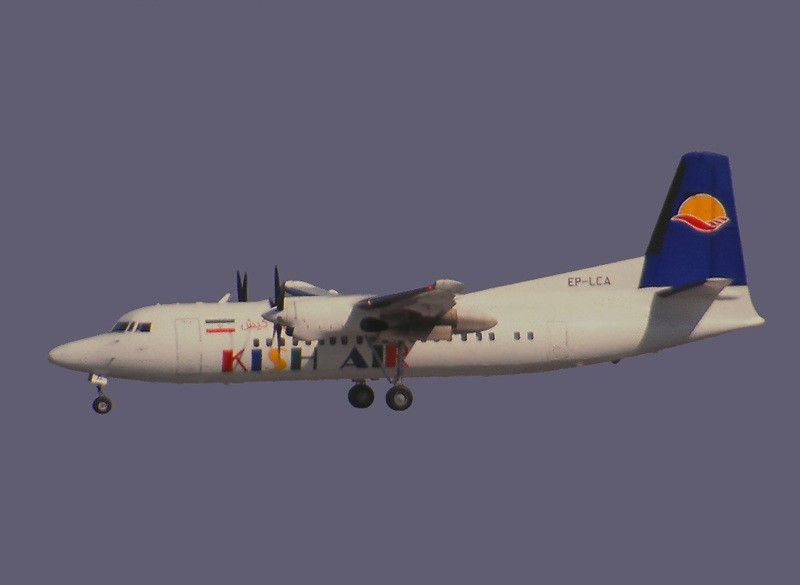
- EP-LCA, the aircraft involved in the accident, seen in 2003
- Aircraft type: Fokker 50
- Aircraft name: Ghadir
- Operator: Kish Air
- IATA flight No.: Y97170
- ICAO flight No.: KIS7170
- Call sign: KISH AIR 7170
- Registration: EP-LCA
- Flight origin: Kish Airport, Kish Island, Iran
- Destination: Sharjah International Airport, Sharjah, United Arab Emirates
- Occupants: 46
- Passengers: 40
- Crew: 6
- Fatalities: 43 (37 passengers, 6 crew)
- Injuries: 3
- Survivors: 3

Kish Air Flight 7170 was a scheduled international passenger flight from Kish Island in Iran to Sharjah, United Arab Emirates, operated by Iranian airline Kish Air. On February 10, 2004, the aircraft serving the route, a Fokker 50, lost control and crashed onto terrain while on approach to Sharjah International Airport. A total of 43 out of 46 people on board were killed in the crash, making it the deadliest air disaster involving the Fokker 50.

The Emirati General Civil Aviation Authority concluded that the accident was mainly caused by pilot error. The captain suddenly asked the first officer to conduct the approach. This took the unprepared first officer by surprise, causing him to be nervous and eventually led to the aircraft being high on approach. Realizing this, the captain took over the control and reduced the engine power until it reached the ground range to quickly decrease their altitude. However, the captain accidentally caused the throttles to enter the reverse range, deploying reverse pitch propellers in mid-air and ultimately caused the aircraft to crash.

Kish Air 7170 crashed in a similar manner with Luxair Flight 9642, another accident involving the Fokker 50 which had crashed just two years prior in Luxembourg. The crash of Luxair 9642 had resulted in the mandatory recommendation for every Fokker 50 operator to send their aircraft back to the manufacturer for modification. The striking resemblances between both disasters caused authorities to urge non-compliant operators to immediately transport their Fokker 50 for the updated design.

== Aircraft ==
The aircraft involved was a Fokker 50, registered EP-LCA. The aircraft had followed an "A" check on 24 December 2003 and was due to another check on 31 April 2004. The aircraft was equipped with two Pratt & Whitney Canada engines and two Dowty Propellers.

== Flight ==
Flight 7170 was a scheduled international passenger flight from the Iranian resort island of Kish to Sharjah International Airport in United Arab Emirates. On 10 February, the aircraft was scheduled to take off from Kish with 42 passengers and 6 crew members on board. The commander of the flight was Captain Ahmed Hosseini and his co-pilot was First Officer Nemat Panahian. The weather and visibility at Sharjah were both good. The flight was supposed to take about 35 minutes. It eventually took off from Kish at early noon. The take-off phase was uneventful.

During the enroute phase, shortly before the aircraft started its descent to Sharjah, Captain Hosseini asked First Officer Panahian to switch roles, making Panahian the pilot who was responsible for the controls. First Officer Panahian was surprised by this decision as this was not what the pilots had planned earlier, eventually declining the captain's order stating that he was not confident enough on his ability to conduct the approach to the airport. Captain Hosseini, however, refused to accept his answer and insisted Panahian be the pilot flying, stating that he would provide assistance during the approach. First Officer Panahian reluctantly accepted this and became the pilot flying for the approach phase.

=== Approach ===
As the aircraft approached Sharjah, the crew initiated the approach briefing and read the checklist. During the approach, Captain Hosseini kept giving advice to First Officer Panahian regarding the aircraft's track.

At 11:24 am GST (UTC+4.00), the crew's request for descent from 9000 feet was granted by air traffic control at Dubai. They were then cleared for a VOR/DME approach to Sharjah airport and at 11:36 GST they were cleared for landing at runway 12. Captain Hosseini asked First Officer Panahian to set the minimum descent altitude (MDA) to 410 feet (120 m), a bit lower than the airport's official MDA of 500 feet (150 m). First Officer Panahian then tried to position the aircraft for the final approach. The aircraft was flying with its autopilot on and was slightly higher than the normal approach profile. It was still not configured for landing as the flaps were still at 0 and the aircraft was 50 knots (93 km/h; 58 mph) faster than the usual speed for approach.

The aircraft rapidly approached the minimum descent altitude for Sharjah. The crew managed to decrease the airspeed by a bit and deployed the flaps to 10. Captain Hosseini later set the flaps to 25. The landing gear began to be extended. The aircraft, however, was still too high and too fast. With a remaining distance of less than 3 nautical miles (3.5 mi; 5.6 km) between the aircraft and the airport, Captain Hosseini tried to take over the control from First Officer Panahian. He intended to give the control back to Panahian once the aircraft was on the correct approach profile. First Officer Panahian accepted Hosseini's request and gave the control to him.

=== Crash ===
Keen to decrease their altitude, Captain Hosseini tried to cause the thrust setting to enter the ground range by pulling the thrust lever's ground range selector. Immediately afterwards, the propeller speed jumped and caused a noisy sound loud enough to startle both pilots. The aircraft pitched down and gradually rolled to the left at an angle of more than 30 degrees. Captain Hosseini exclaimed "Why!" and eventually realised that the reverser had been deployed in mid-air. Shortly after, he instructed First Officer Panahian to move the lever fully forward. They successfully decreased the roll and raised the nose, but not enough to keep the aircraft from falling.

Another aircraft on the ground was on its way to line up with the runway when the crew saw Flight 7170 pitching down and starting to roll again. It entered a steep left bank dive and went into a spiral. The aircraft continued to plunge in a heavy left bank angle until it struck the ground, narrowly missing a residential area, crossed a road and exploded on impact, bursting into flames. It crashed about 2.6 nautical miles (3.0 mi; 4.8 km) from the end of the runway. The front portion was destroyed, but the main fuselage was still intact.

A nearby witness was the first to arrive at the crash site. According to him, cries for help could still be heard from inside the aircraft. He tried to open one of the doors but failed as the door was crushed by the impact forces. While some parts of the fuselage wall had been broken during the crash, fires prevented the passengers from escaping. As there were no fire fighting vehicles for several minutes, the fire rapidly spread and quickly engulfed the fuselage. Just 10 minutes after the crash, the whole cabin section was already engulfed in flames. Rescue services eventually arrived at the scene approximately 25 minutes after the accident, but by then it was already too late as the aircraft had been completely destroyed by the fire.

The rescue operation was further hampered by rubbernecking, where local residents had crowded the scene of the crash. The fire was extinguished about 30 minutes after the accident. At least 4 survivors were found within the crash site, but one succumbed to their injuries as they were being transported to hospital. One of the survivors was found in stable condition, while the other two were unconscious and were in critical condition.

A total of 43 people perished in the accident. Bodies of the victims were lined up and were taken to Dubai for identification.

== Passengers and crew ==
Nationality	Killed		Survivors		Total
Nationality	Passengers	Crew	Passengers	Crew	Total
Algeria	2	0	0	0	2
Bangladesh	1	0	0	0	1
Cameroon	1	0	0	0	1
Egypt	3	0	1	0	4
United Arab Emirates	1	0	0	0	1
Philippines	1	0	1	0	1
India	13	0	0	0	13
Iran	11	6	1	0	17
Nepal	1	0	0	0	1
Nigeria	1	0	0	0	1
Sudan	1	0	0	0	1
Syria	1	0	0	0	1
Total	37	6	3	0	46

There were 40 passengers on board, including one infant. Most of the passengers were migrant workers. Many on board were going to renew their work visas, as the permit regulations in UAE at the time required workers to renew their visas outside the country. The flight was frequented by migrant workers from UAE who were intending to renew their visas in the Iranian resort island of Kish as Kish Island was designated by Iranian authorities as a free trade zone and no visa was required prior to arrival. The tickets were also cheap and the island was also a popular tourist destination with abundant affordable accommodation.

Reports indicated that there were people of at least 12 nationalities, in which the majority were Iranians.

Officials stated that the three survivors of the crash consisted of one Egyptian, one Filipino and one Iranian. The Filipino survivor was found to be conscious and stable, while the other two were in serious condition. The survivors were reportedly seated in the middle section of the aircraft.

There were 6 crew members on board, consisting of 2 cockpit crew, 2 cabin crew and 2 security personnel. The commander of the flight was 48-year-old Captain Ahmed Hosseini. He had a total flying experience of 6,440 hours, of which more than 1,500 hours were on the Fokker 50. He was a former military pilot. The co-pilot was 50-year-old First Officer Nemat Panahian. He had accumulated a total flying experience of nearly 4,000 hours, of which 517 hours were on the Fokker 50.

== Investigation ==
The investigation was conducted by Emirates General Civil Aviation Authority, as well as several investigation team from the outside, including the Iran Civil Aviation Organization (CAO), representing as the State of Operator and the Dutch Transport Safety Board, representing as the manufacturer of the aircraft.

Based on the aircraft's logbook, there were no recorded defects or unscheduled maintenance since overhaul. The aircraft technical logbooks indicated that there had been no scheduled or unscheduled maintenance conducted on the aircraft propeller components.

The Cockpit Voice Recorder and the Digital Flight Data Recorder were retrieved from the relatively undamaged tail section of the aircraft in very good condition. They were presented to the Bureau of Enquiry and Analysis for Civil Aviation Safety (BEA) in Le Bourget, France on 16 February 2004 for extraction of the DFDR data and CVR transcription.

=== Conduct of approach ===
The approach was initially planned to be conducted by Captain Hosseini as the pilot flying, but it ended up being switched during the enroute phase. The sudden role switch caught First Officer Panahian off guard as it had not been agreed by both pilots prior to the flight. First Officer Panahian had refused on conducting the approach as he was not confident on his ability to land, but Captain Hosseini pushed him and insisted him to do it. Either for cultural or professional reasons, Panahian eventually accepted this, albeit reluctantly.

Due to the unprepared nature of the approach, Panahian caused the aircraft to fly at an altitude that was too high for an approach and an airspeed that was 50 knots (93 km/h; 58 mph) faster than the normal airspeed value of 130 knots (240 km/h; 150 mph). The aircraft was not configured appropriately for the landing. The flaps and the landing gear were eventually deployed while the aircraft was flying at about 180 knots (330 km/h; 210 mph). Dissatisfied with their current approach profile, Captain Hosseini eventually took over the control from Panahian, adding that he would delegate the controls back to Panahian once they had stabilised the aircraft for the intended approach profile.

As the aircraft became nearer to the airport, the crew had to quickly decrease their altitude, or they would have overshot the runway. Captain Hosseini tried to do this by attempting to cause the engine thrust to enter the ground range by pulling the ground range selector. The thrust, however, moved even further from the ground range and entered the reverse value. The reverse setting was prohibited to be deployed while the aircraft was still in mid-air. As the engine started to produce reverse thrust, massive drag forces began to appear, crippling the aircraft's ability to fly.

As the crew realized that the reverser had been deployed in the air, the thrust levers were quickly moved forward. Their action on moving the throttle, however, was too quick, giving the hydraulics no time to compensate. The counterweights eventually caused the blade pitch of the left propeller to fully decrease. Instead of increasing the airspeed, the engines put the propellers into maximum reverse, producing large amount of drag. The aircraft then dived with a heavy left bank angle and crashed onto the residential area.

=== Reverse angle ===
The thrust range in Fokker 50 was consisted of two control ranges. The first one was the flight control range, which was used for virtually nearly all phases of flight other than landing. The other was the ground range, which also included the reverse range. Both thrust ranges were typically used during landing due to its deceleration effect. As both were used for landing, pilots were generally banned from applying this thrust setting while their aircraft was still in mid-air as the resultant drag forces would have threatened the controllability of the aircraft.

To prevent the thrust from entering the ground range, Fokker equipped two safety features on the aircraft. The first safety feature was the primary stop, also known as the ground range selector. The stop would have prevented the lever from going backwards and entering the ground range. To disarm the primary stop, pilots should lift the ground range selector. By doing so, the levers could be pulled way back into the ground range.

Even though the ground range selector had been lifted, the thrust shouldn't have been able to enter the reverse range at all. Fokker had installed another safety feature to prevent such incident from occurring. Called a secondary stop, the feature would have stopped the thrust from going all the way back to the reverse range and would hold it onto the idle position. The secondary stop was an electrical flight idle solenoid that was equipped on each propeller of the aircraft and was powered by the skid-control unit. The secondary stop couldn't be deactivated unless the aircraft was on the ground by detecting the spinning motion of the wheels.

While the purpose of the secondary stop was to prevent the thrust from entering the ground range, the feature could be overridden by a glitch within the aircraft's components.

=== Design flaw ===
The safety feature could be overridden by an electromagnetic interference from the aircraft's skid-control unit, which in turn powered the solenoids. The interference was produced by the extension of the landing gear. The resulting interference energized both flight solenoids (secondary stop), tricking both solenoids and caused them to falsely interpret that the aircraft was already on the ground. After powering up both solenoids, the glitch would not disappear for at least 16 seconds.

In Flight 7170, after extending the landing gear, Captain Hosseini decided to take over the control and lifted the ground range selector in order to enable the thrust to enter the ground range. As it was still within the 16 seconds timeframe, the thrust went way back into the reverse range, putting the propellers into reverse and caused the crash.

Fokker knew about the existence of the glitch and had tried to warn operators about it. Following the crash of Luxair Flight 9642 two years earlier, which crashed in the exact similar manner, Fokker issued a mandatory modification on the anti-skid control units to prevent it from emitting electromagnetic interference into the secondary stop. The announcement was made in 2003 and all aircraft should have been modified by then, but in Flight 7170 the thrust still managed to enter the reverse range.

The investigation revealed that the anti-skid control unit of the aircraft involved in the crash was still in the original unmodified condition. According to recommendations issued by Fokker, aircraft with unmodified anti-skid control unit were subjected for modification in 2004. This included the involved Kish Air Fokker 50, where it was planned to undergo modification in May 2004.

=== Final report ===
The final report, published in April 2005, concluded that the crash was caused by the movement of the power levers to the back by one of the pilots, causing the thrust to enter the reverse range.

The General Civil Aviation Authority also listed the following contributing factors:

"Contributory factors:

- By suddenly insisting the First Officer fly the final approach, the pilot in command created an environment, which led to a breakdown of crew resource management processes, the non observance of the operator's standard operating procedures and a resultant excessive high approach speed.
- An attempt to rectify this excessive high approach speed most likely resulted in the non compliance with the Standard Operating Procedures and the movement of the power levers below flight idle.
- The unmodified version of the Skid Control Unit failed to provide adequate protection at the time of the event."

— General Civil Aviation Authority

Despite the nature of the crash, investigators only issued 4 recommendations to the involved parties. Among those were calls for Dutch Civil Aviation Authority to strongly urge non-compliant operators to modify the anti-skid control unit of the Fokker 50, recommendation for Iranian CAO to stress the importance of proper training and prohibition regarding the use of ground control range during flight, and new calls for ICAO to implement cockpit video camera policy.

== Aftermath ==
Prior to the crash, migrant workers were required to renew their visas outside of UAE. Following the crash of Flight 7170, Emirati officials cancelled the policy. The law change was initially enacted by only one of the 7 emirates, the Dubai Emirates, just hours after the crash. On February 11, UAE President Shaikh Zayed Bin Sultan Al Nahayan announced a nationwide change on the visa-law.

In 2010, the Federal Supreme Court of the UAE ordered Kish Air to pay Dh864,000 to the families of the victims. Spokesperson of Kish Air stated that the airline was in the process of settling the amount of payment.

== See also ==
- Air Caraïbes Flight 1501, a similar crash in Guadeloupe in which the pilots accidentally changed the aircraft's propeller switch into reverse pitch while still in mid-air
- Luxair Flight 9642, a similar crash in Luxembourg in which the pilots accidentally changed the aircraft's propeller switch into reverse pitch while still in mid-air
- Airlines PNG Flight 1600, a similar crash in Papua New Guinea involving a Dash 8 in which the pilots accidentally changed the aircraft's propeller switch into reverse pitch while still in mid-air
- Merpati Nusantara Airlines Flight 6517, a similar crash in Indonesia involving a Xian MA60 in which the pilots accidentally changed the aircraft's propeller switch into reverse pitch while still in mid-air
