= Luxair Flight 9642 =

2002 aviation accident in Luxembourg

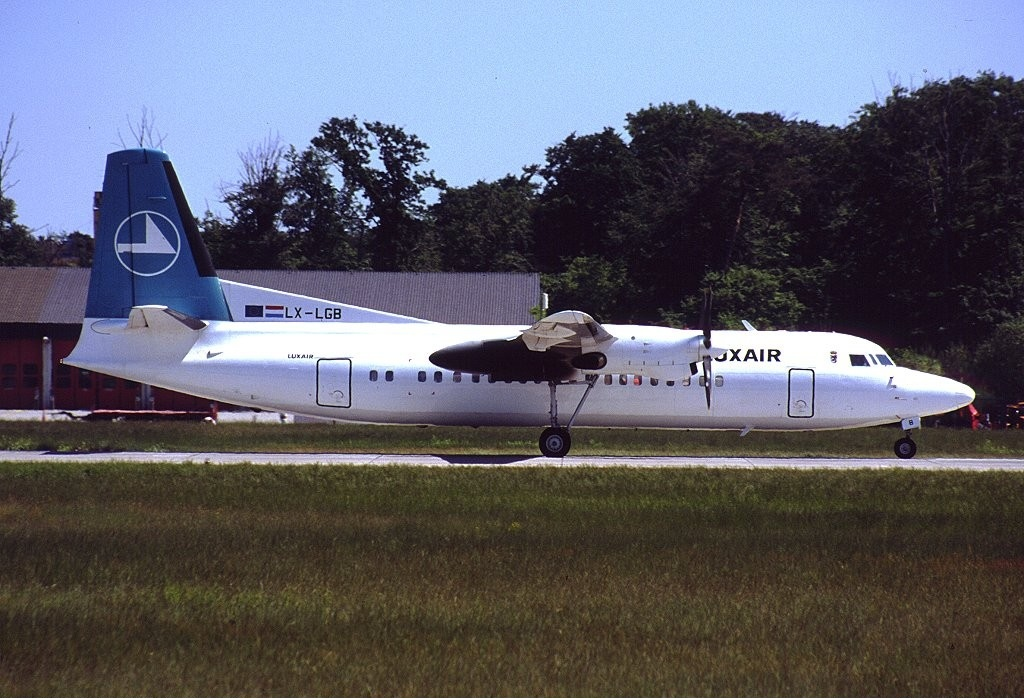
- LX-LGB, the aircraft involved in the accident, pictured in 2000

Accident
- Date: 6 November 2002
- Summary: Pilot error aggravated by inclement weather and in-flight thrust reversal following technical issues
- Site: Niederanven, near Luxembourg Findel Airport, Luxembourg City, Luxembourg; 49°39′21″N 6°16′26″E

Aircraft
- Aircraft type: Fokker 50
- Operator: Luxair
- IATA flight No.: LG9642
- ICAO flight No.: LGL9642
- Call sign: LUXAIR 9642
- Registration: LX-LGB
- Flight origin: Berlin Tempelhof Airport, Berlin, Germany
- Destination: Luxembourg Findel Airport, Luxembourg City, Luxembourg
- Occupants: 22
- Passengers: 19
- Crew: 3
- Fatalities: 20
- Injuries: 2
- Survivors: 2

Luxair Flight 9642 was a scheduled international passenger flight from Berlin Tempelhof Airport, Germany, to Luxembourg Findel Airport, Luxembourg, operated by Luxembourg's national airline, Luxair. On 6 November 2002, the Fokker 50 operating the flight lost control and crashed into a field during an attempted landing at the airport. Out of 22 passengers and crew members on board, only two people survived. The crash is the deadliest aviation disaster to occur in Luxembourg and the only fatal accident in Luxair's history.

Luxembourg's Administration for Technical Investigations (AET) concluded that the crash was caused by pilot error. The crew accepted the approach clearance given by ATC even though they were not fully prepared for landing. They then improvised to override a safety feature preventing the propellers from entering reverse pitch in flight, leading to a loss of control.

The investigation highlighted a safety risk in the protection system designed to prevent the accidental deployment of reverse pitch in turboprops during flight, prompting Fokker to issue a mandatory modification for the safety feature.

== Background ==
=== Aircraft ===
The aircraft involved was a Fokker 50, manufactured in 1991 and delivered to Luxair in the same year, with aircraft registration LX-LGB. Equipped with Pratt & Whitney PW125B engines and two Dowty propellers, it had accumulated a total of 24,068 flight cycles. According to Luxair, the aircraft had been maintained properly; its last scheduled service was conducted on 4 May. The maintenance logbook indicated that the last defect, an inoperative anti-skid system, had been rectified on 5 November, one day before the accident.

=== Crew ===
In command was 26-year-old Captain Claude Poeckes, who had a total flying experience of 4,242 flight hours, including 2,864 hours on type. His co-pilot was 32-year-old First Officer John Arendt, with 1,156 total flight hours, including 443 hours on type.

== Accident ==
Flight 9642 was a regularly scheduled international passenger flight from Berlin-Tempelhof Airport to Luxembourg Findel Airport. On 6 November, the aircraft was piloted by Captain Claude Poeckes and First Officer John Arendt. It took off from Berlin at around 07:40 local time with 19 passengers and 3 crew members on board.

While the aircraft was at cruising altitude, at around 08:55, the pilots checked the Automatic Terminal Information Service (ATIS) for weather information at Luxembourg. The runway visual range (RVR) was 275 metres (902 ft), lower than the 300 metres (980 ft) minimum required for the Fokker 50 to land. Visibility in the area had deteriorated due to heavy fog. With such low visibility, the crew realised that their landing would be delayed, and that they would either have to enter a holding pattern until weather conditions improved or divert to their alternate airport.

The crew continued towards Luxembourg and checked the ATIS weather again, but visibility had not improved. They discussed possible strategies for landing in bad weather conditions, but failed to reach a conclusion. Because no decision was made, the approach briefing was not conducted.

While First Officer Arendt was making an announcement to the passengers, Captain Poeckes contacted Luxair officials to ask whether the weather had improved, hoping a departing Cargolux jet might have dispersed some of the fog. To his disappointment, the airport remained covered in heavy fog. Because of the persistent fog, the crew were instructed to enter the holding pattern at the Diekirch VOR. First Officer Arendt then announced to the passengers that the flight would enter a holding pattern to wait for the weather to improve.

As they were heading towards the holding pattern, ATC suddenly radioed the crew and instructed them to descend to 3,000 feet (910 m) and change their heading. The transmission caught them off guard. First Officer Arendt was initially confused and asked Captain Poeckes, "Is that for us?", to which the captain replied, "Yes." The crew accepted the instruction, though Arendt remained surprised, remarking, "What kind of shit is that?"

=== Approach ===
The crew still did not understand the reason for the descent requested by the controller. Suspecting they were being vectored for an approach, they repeatedly checked the RVR value with Luxair Dispatch, but visibility at Findel Airport remained below landing minima. They were initially uncertain whether the controller had issued the instruction for a hold or for an approach.

09:00:22	Captain Poeckes	What is the RVR at the moment?
	Luxair Dispatch	Eh, 275
09:00:38	Captain Poeckes	275 meters, what do we do now?
09:00:41	First Officer Arendt	I don't know
09:01:06	First Officer Arendt	Yes, what do they do with us then? Holding or is it for an approach?

Shortly afterwards, the controller cleared up the crew's confusion by explicitly instructing Flight 9642 to conduct an approach to Findel Airport. The crew were perplexed, as the weather conditions did not meet the minimum requirements for landing. Meanwhile, ATC was unaware of the aircraft's required RVR minimum because the crew had not reported it. Despite their confusion, the crew accepted the instruction and flew the aircraft as directed. Realising they had been sequenced as the first aircraft to land at Findel, the crew faced increased workload pressure and hurriedly prepared the aircraft for the approach.

09:01:42	First Officer Arendt	Oh gosh, they bring us in before all the others!
09:01:44	First Officer Arendt	They bring us in before everybody!
09:01:58	First Officer Arendt	Should we switch on the seat belts?
09:02:00	Captain Poeckes	Yes, yes. This wouldn't be a bad idea

The flight eventually levelled off at 3,000 feet (910 m) and approached the ELU radio beacon, the final approach fix. While approaching the beacon, Captain Poeckes told First Officer Arendt that they would execute a missed approach if visibility remained below 300 metres (980 ft). After capturing the airport's ILS, the crew checked the RVR again, only to find that the weather had deteriorated further, with the RVR dropping to 250 metres (820 ft). With conditions clearly below minima, the crew finally informed ATC that they required an RVR of 300 metres (980 ft) to land.

After rushing through the approach checklist, the aircraft reached ELU. The crew checked the RVR again, and the report showed no improvement. Captain Poeckes told First Officer Arendt that they would execute a missed approach, yet the aircraft continued towards Findel. Arendt continued working through the approach checklist and placed the ground-idle stop in the off position, the final item on the checklist.

Dissatisfied with the weather report, Captain Poeckes called for a go-around at 09:04 local time. Just 10 seconds later, however, ATC reported that the RVR had improved to 300 metres, the exact landing minimum for the Fokker 50. Immediately after this report, Poeckes reversed his decision, and Arendt prepared the aircraft for landing.

=== Crash ===
Because the aircraft had remained level at 3,000 feet (910 m) for some time after passing ELU, it was flying well above the glideslope. To lose altitude faster, Captain Poeckes stated that he would pull the power levers back to flight idle, claiming this would allow the aircraft to descend rapidly to the required profile. However, First Officer Arendt voiced his concern, telling Poeckes that such an action would not be enough to slow the aircraft down.

First Officer Arendt reported to ATC that they would continue the approach to Findel. Flight 9642 was cleared to land, and the crew extended the landing gear.

09:05:13	First Officer Arendt	Clear to land, nine six four two
09:05:16	Commentary	Noise similar to selecting gear down followed by gear extension noises
09:05:16	First Officer Arendt	This will rather be...
09:05:16	Commentary	Noise of increasing propeller speed
09:05:17	Commentary	Noise of power levers passing through the idle position
09:05:19	Captain Poeckes	What's that?

After the landing gear was extended, the propeller speed began to increase, startling the crew with the sudden loud noise. The aircraft's airspeed and altitude then dropped rapidly. Realising that reverse thrust had engaged in mid-flight, the crew tried to save the aircraft. To regain lift, First Officer Arendt immediately retracted the flaps while Captain Poeckes pushed the thrust levers fully forward. However, the aircraft continued to plummet towards the ground.

As a last resort, the crew shut down both engines, but this failed to arrest the rapid descent. Faced with an imminent crash, the crew tried to flare as much as possible to soften the impact.

09:05:28	First Officer Arendt	Wow this was shrewd stuff!
	Commentary	Noise similar to electric transfer
09:05:29	Captain Poeckes	Oh shit!
09:05:29	First Officer Arendt	*Heavy breathing*
09:05:40	Commentary	Noise similar to electric transfer
09:05:41	Commentary	Double chime
09:05:44	Commentary	End of recording

The aircraft touched down heavily, crossing Route Nationale 1 (RN 1) and scraping the road with its left wing before striking an embankment and coming to rest in an adjacent agricultural field 25 metres (82 ft) beyond. The airframe sustained severe damage: both main landing gear legs were ripped off, and a total of five propeller blades broke away, although the engines themselves suffered only light damage. The empennage and part of the right wing broke off, and the aft fuselage detached and came to rest on its right side. After the aircraft stopped, a fire broke out in the central section of the crushed fuselage.

=== Immediate aftermath ===
Flight 9642 abruptly lost all contact with Findel Airport. Its blip disappeared from the radar screen, prompting the controller to call the crew multiple times to check on their status. When there was no response, airport emergency services were alerted to a possible crash, which was soon confirmed by a telephone call from an eyewitness. Meanwhile, at the crash site, taxi driver Guillaume Wainachter was the first to arrive. He attempted to rescue passengers from the fuselage after hearing survivors screaming inside the wreckage, but while doing so he heard a noise from the aircraft, which burst into flames within seconds.

Investigators determined that the aircraft had crashed in a field 700 metres (2,300 ft; 770 yd) north of the runway centreline, between the villages of Niederanven and Roodt-Syr. Rescue workers found that several passengers had been ejected from the aircraft during the impact, including one survivor who was found outside the wreckage. Three other survivors were extricated alive from the fuselage and rushed to hospital, where all three later succumbed to their injuries. Captain Poeckes was found trapped in the cockpit, which had not caught fire, and survived after rescuers cut a hole in the wreckage to evacuate him.

The fog was so thick that many nearby residents were unaware of the crash; most reported neither seeing nor hearing the impact, realising something had happened only when ambulances and emergency vehicles arrived at the scene.

Following the crash, Findel Airport was closed for more than three hours, and several flights were diverted to Germany and Belgium.

== Victims ==
Nationality	Passengers		Crew		Total	
Nationality	Total	Killed	Total	Killed	Total	Killed
France	2	1	0	0	2	1
Germany	15	15	0	0	15	15
Luxembourg	2	2	3	2	5	4
Total	19	18	3	2	22	20

Seating chart of the aircraft

Most of the passengers were business executives from Germany. Seventeen people were found dead at the crash site and five initially survived, three of whom later died in hospital. By nightfall, 18 of the 20 bodies had been recovered, while two remained missing, believed to be trapped beneath the smouldering fuselage; rescue workers used a crane to extricate the charred remains. Among the passengers killed on the flight was artist Michel Majerus.

== Response ==
Following the crash, a hospital in Belgium was placed on alert, and 300 police officers were dispatched to the scene. The government of Luxembourg requested additional assistance from the Belgian government, which deployed three helicopters to the crash site and placed a military hospital on standby.

Prime Minister of Luxembourg Jean-Claude Juncker visited the accident site on the day of the crash, accompanied by Interior Minister Michel Wolter, Transport Minister Henri Grethen, and Grand Duchess Maria Teresa. The prime minister subsequently convened an emergency meeting regarding the crash, and German Transport Minister Manfred Stolpe travelled to Luxembourg to meet with officials.

Relatives of the victims were escorted to a special morgue to identify the deceased, and psychological counselling was provided by the state for affected families. State flags were ordered to be flown at half-mast across the country until 10 November. A memorial service was held on 7 November, followed by another service on 10 November at the capital's Notre-Dame Cathedral.

== Investigation ==
Investigators noted that Findel Airport was covered by autumn fog at the time of the accident. Residents of nearby Niederanven reported that the fog was so dense that they had not realised a crash had occurred despite their proximity to the site.

The aircraft's maintenance logbook was clean. A maintenance crew had inspected the aircraft on the evening before the flight, and the only recurring defect, an inoperative anti-skid system, had been rectified the day before the accident.

=== Lack of preparation ===
At 07:53 local time, the flight crew established initial contact with the approach controller and requested visibility information for the airport. The controller supplied the current RVR data, which worried the crew because it was below the minimum required for the Fokker 50. They decided to wait in the holding pattern until weather conditions improved. However, they did not relay their required minimum visibility to the controller, leading the controller to assume the crew could conduct an approach regardless of the RVR value. Meanwhile, believing it would be some time before they received landing clearance, the crew made no preparations for landing.

As Flight 9642 neared the holding pattern, the controller noticed that it was becoming congested, with three other Luxair flights already holding. Seeking to ease the congestion, the controller decided to clear one flight for an immediate approach. Flight 9642 was the most suitable candidate because it had not yet entered the holding pattern, meaning clearing it first would minimise delays for the other aircraft. The controller therefore instructed the crew to begin an approach to Findel.

After brief confusion and confirmation from the controller, the unprepared crew were caught off guard by the instruction. Having expected to wait in the holding pattern, they suddenly had far less time before landing. They rushed through their checklist and hastily conducted an approach briefing, inadvertently omitting several standard procedural steps due to the time pressure.

Uncertain about the approach, Captain Poeckes told First Officer Arendt that they would perform a go-around if the RVR remained below minima. Arendt, however, disregarded this and continued with the approach checklist, indicating a breakdown in crew resource management stemming from their lack of preparation. Poeckes eventually called for a go-around, but upon receiving an updated RVR report showing that visibility had reached the exact landing minimum, he immediately reversed his decision and elected to continue the approach.

The abrupt decision to continue left the crew scrambling to capture the glideslope, as the aircraft had remained level at 3,000 feet (910 m) and had already passed the final approach fix, the point at which the final descent should begin. No standard procedure existed for intercepting the glideslope after passing the final approach fix; the crew should have executed a missed approach, but instead remained determined to land at Findel as quickly as possible.

Realising they were high above the glideslope, Captain Poeckes reduced engine thrust. Eager to capture the glideslope quickly, he decided to improvise using a technique he had learned previously.

=== Reverse range ===
To achieve the desired descent rate and airspeed, Captain Poeckes attempted to place the engines into ground range by lifting the ground-range selector. Doing so would reduce airspeed further and, in Poeckes's view, allow the aircraft to intercept the glideslope quickly. Although pilots could use this technique on the ground, it was strictly prohibited in flight. Beyond the ground range lay the reverse range, which shifted the propellers into reverse pitch, a setting intended solely for deceleration during the landing roll. Engaging reverse pitch in flight generated massive aerodynamic drag and endangered the aircraft. To prevent accidental deployment of reverse pitch in flight, the Fokker 50 was equipped with a secondary stop controlled by flight-idle solenoids.

However, this safety mechanism could be bypassed due to a design flaw in the Fokker 50's flight systems. Fokker knew that extending the landing gear could generate electromagnetic interference in the aircraft's anti-skid control units, tricking the system for 30 microseconds into registering wheel spin-up as though the aircraft had touched down. This brief glitch energised the flight-idle solenoids, deceiving them into sensing that the aircraft was rolling on the runway and causing them to unlock the secondary stop for 16 seconds.

On Flight 9642, when the crew extended the landing gear on approach, the electromagnetic interference occurred, energising the flight-idle solenoids and releasing the secondary stop. Concerned about their high altitude and limited time, Captain Poeckes pulled the power levers back past the ground range into the reverse range in an effort to capture the glideslope faster. Under normal conditions, the secondary stop would have blocked the levers from entering the reverse range, but because the 16-second unlock window was still active, reverse thrust engaged in mid-flight.

In-flight reverse thrust rendered the aircraft uncontrollable. Propeller speed surged abruptly, producing a loud noise that startled the pilots, while airspeed and lift plummeted, sending the aircraft into a rapid descent. The crew tried to recover by cutting off fuel to the engines, but the aircraft continued to plunge. In a final effort, they flared as much as possible to lessen the impact, aware that reverse thrust had deployed in flight but unable to correct it.

=== Design flaw ===
Fokker had been aware of the potential aircraft-induced release of the secondary stop since 1988, having identified the anti-skid power-up interference during maintenance testing. However, judging the probability of such an incident occurring to be very low, Fokker concluded that no immediate corrective action was necessary. For the unintended release to occur, four conditions had to coincide:

- The landing gear had to be lowered;
- The anti-skid units had to experience the power-up glitch, unlocking the secondary stop for 16 seconds;
- The power levers had to be below the flight-idle position and the crew had to lift the ground-range selector (an abnormal procedure in flight);
- Within the 16-second window, the crew had to pull the power levers further aft into the reverse range.

In December 1994, Fokker disseminated these findings to all operators of the type, including Luxair.

Earlier, in 1992, Fokker had issued a non-binding service bulletin recommending that operators send their Fokker 50 fleets for a voluntary modification of the anti-skid units to prevent the interference. While several Fokker 50s underwent the modification, Luxair's aircraft was not among them because the update was not mandatory.

=== Conclusion ===
In December 2003, Luxembourg's AET published its final report, concluding the cause of the crash as follows:

The initial cause of the accident is the crew's acceptance of the approach clearance although they were not prepared to it, namely the absence of preparation of a go-around. It led the crew to perform a series of improvised actions that ended in the prohibited override of the primary stop on the power levers and leading to an irreversible loss of control.

— AET

Contributing to the accident were shortcomings in implementing a safety recommendation issued by the manufacturer to Fokker 50 operators.

The crash prompted immediate regulatory action. Nearly two weeks after the accident, following the discovery that the secondary stop had failed to prevent reverse thrust from engaging in flight, Luxembourg's aviation authorities grounded Luxair's remaining Fokker 50 fleet until interim operational restrictions were put in place. In May 2003, Fokker issued a service bulletin for a permanent modification to the anti-skid control unit, which Dutch aviation authorities, acting as the regulator for the aircraft's state of design, made mandatory for all Fokker 50 operators worldwide in July 2003, with a compliance deadline of 30 November 2003.

== Aftermath ==
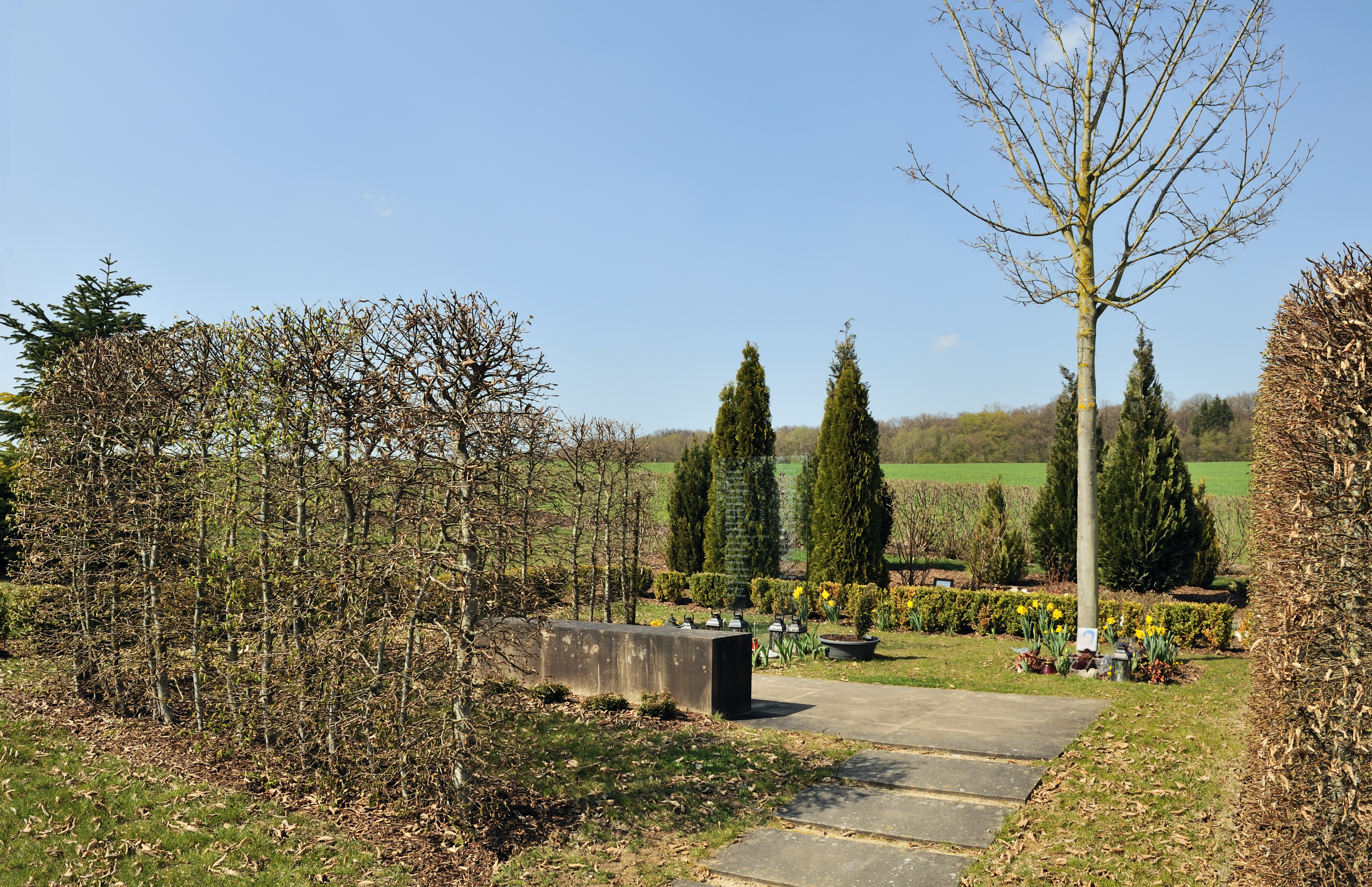
Memorial to the accident

A criminal prosecution was initiated, though proceedings were delayed until 10 October 2011. Seven people were charged with involuntary manslaughter and negligence: Captain Poeckes, three former Luxair general directors, Luxair's former technical director, and two aircraft mechanics. On 27 March 2012, the three former general directors were acquitted, while the remaining four defendants were found guilty. Poeckes was sentenced to 42 months (3.5 years) of probation and fined €4,000. The former technical director received an 18-month suspended sentence and a €2,500 fine, while the two mechanics each received a two-year suspended sentence and a €2,000 fine. In January 2014, the families of four victims were awarded between €21,000 and €130,000 in compensation. In February of that year, defence attorneys for the convicted appealed the verdict. In May 2015, a court awarded €310,000 in compensation to the families of three German victims.

== In popular culture ==
The accident is featured in season 25, episode 4 of the Canadian documentary series Mayday, titled "Second Thoughts".

== See also ==
- Air Caraïbes Flight 1501, a similar crash in Guadeloupe in which the pilots accidentally placed the propellers into reverse pitch in mid-flight
- Airlines PNG Flight 1600, a similar crash in Papua New Guinea involving a Dash 8 in which the pilots accidentally placed the propellers into reverse pitch in mid-flight
- Kish Air Flight 7170, a similar crash in the United Arab Emirates in which the pilots accidentally placed the propellers into reverse pitch in mid-flight
- Merpati Nusantara Airlines Flight 6517, a similar crash in Indonesia involving a Xian MA60 in which the pilots accidentally placed the propellers into reverse pitch in mid-flight
