= Col de la Tourmente =

- Quartier
- The quartier of Col de la Tourmente marked 12.
- Coordinates: 17°54′15″N 62°50′57″W
- Country: France
- Overseas collectivity: Saint Barthélemy

Col de la Tourmente (French pronunciation: [kɔl də la tuʁmɑ̃t]) is a quartier of Saint Barthélemy in the Caribbean. It is located in the western part of the island.
