= Michel Majerus =

Luxembourgish painter (1967–2002)

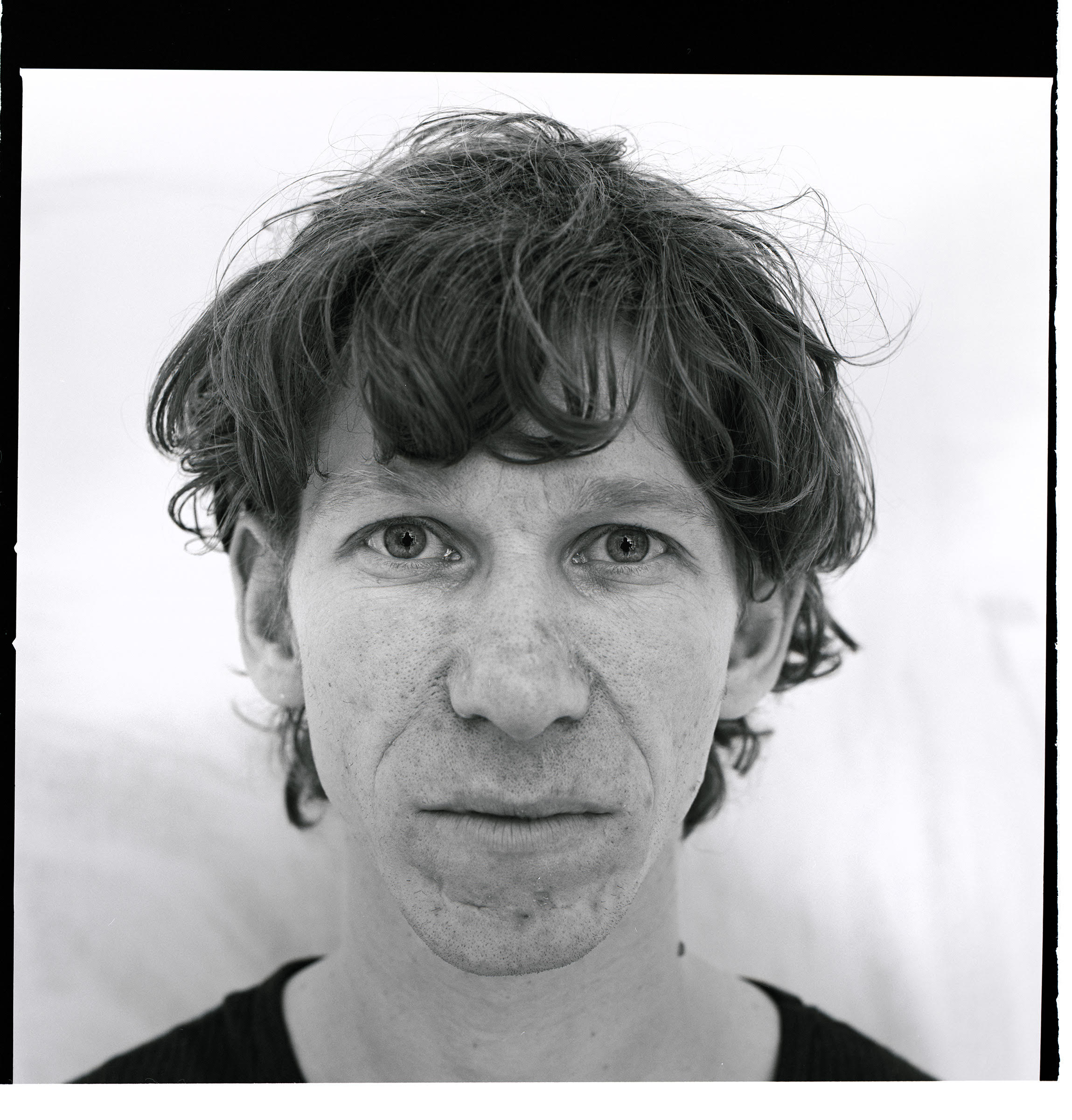
- Majerus in Berlin in 2000, photographed by Oliver Mark
- Born: 9 June 1967; Esch-sur-Alzette, Luxembourg
- Died: 6 November 2002 (aged 35); Niederanven, Luxembourg
- Education: State Academy of Fine Arts, Stuttgart, Germany
- Known for: Digital painting, Appropiation
- Movement: Postmodernism, Neo-pop, Neo-expressionism
- Website: michelmajerus.com

Michel Majerus (9 June 1967 – 6 November 2002) was a Luxembourgish artist who combined painting with digital media in his work. He lived and worked in Berlin until his untimely death in a plane crash in November 2002.

== Early life and education ==
Majerus was born in Esch-sur-Alzette, Luxembourg, in 1967. In 1986, Majerus began to study at the State Academy of Fine Arts Stuttgart, graduating in 1992.

== Art ==
What Looks Good Today May Not Look Good Tomorrow (2000), acrylic on canvas, 341 cm × 303 cm (134 in × 119 in)

In 1992, together with his fellow students from Stuttgart Nader (Ahriman), Stephan Jung, Susa Reinhardt and Wawa (Wawrzyniec) Tokarski, Majerus co-founded the artist group 3K-NH. They used the initials of their nicknames to form a cryptic name. 3K-NH held exhibitions both in Stuttgart and Berlin. In 1993, Majerus and Jung moved to Berlin.

Painting was Majerus's preferred medium of expression, but his creative horizon extended to many aspects of popular culture, from computer games, digital art, film, television, and pop music to trademarks and corporate logos and famous artists. Stylistic quotations of his paintings include aspects of works by Andy Warhol, Willem de Kooning and Jean-Michel Basquiat, video games and other pop-culture sources. In 1996, Majerus began his MoM Block series, comprising more than 170 canvases. MoM is an abbreviation of Modehaus Mitte, a former fashion factory in East Berlin, in which Majerus had his studio for a while.

Majerus did not limit himself to two-dimensional surfaces, but painted installations which surround the viewer. For a 1994 show at his Berlin gallery Neugerriemschneider, he asked that a road be paved inside the modest exhibition space. In 1999, at the invitation of curator Harald Szeemann, he painted the façade of the international pavilion in the Giardini of the Venice Biennale. For his largest work, If You Are Dead, So It Is (2000), Majerus covered the interior surface of a 370 m^{2} (4,000 sq ft) skateboarders' half-pipe.

After moving to Los Angeles in 2000 through the German Academic Exchange Service (DAAD), Majerus began work on a series of thirty large-format paintings incorporating digital media and animated videos. Completed in Berlin the following year, the series eventually comprised over thirty works. Nine of these works would eventually become the Pop Reloaded exhibition in Los Angeles. Pop Reloaded emphasized the visual confusion of the urban landscapes and the scale of freeway billboards and office towers. It drew on works by Cy Twombly, Mark Rothko and Gerhard Richter. The paintings were accompanied by a video of a constantly changing image of Majerus's signature, to illustrate the idea of celebrity as a constantly changing concept.

In 2002, shortly after his return to Berlin from Los Angeles, Majerus installed a life-size photograph of a Brutalist social housing block directly in front of the East side of Brandenburg Gate; the other side was taken over by a work of Thomas Bayrle. Majerus was working on an exhibition entitled "Project Space" for Tate Liverpool when he died. Halbzeit, created in 2002, was one of the last paintings by the artist before he died.

== Exhibitions ==
Majerus's artwork first came to international attention in 1996 with an exhibition at the Kunsthalle in Stuttgart, and then with subsequent exhibitions in Munster and Dundee (Colour Me Blind! – Painting in the Age of Computer Games and Comics, 2000). In 1996 the Kunsthalle Basel organized a mid-career museum retrospective.

In 1998, Majerus was invited to participate in Manifesta 2. He participated in the Venice Biennale in 1999, where he covered the facade of the main Italian Pavilion with a mural he designed.

Since his death in 2002, several museums have organized exhibitions of Majerus's work, including the Hamburger Bahnhof (2003), the Tate Liverpool (2004), the Kunsthaus Graz (2005), and the Kunstmuseum Stuttgart (2011). A posthumous exhibition of his works was featured at the Kunstmuseum of Wolfsburg (Germany) in 2003. Entitled Painting Pictures, the exhibition was a celebration of Majerus's genre and was dedicated to his memory. Other painters represented in Painting Pictures included Takashi Murakami, Sarah Morris, Franz Ackermann, Matthew Ritchie, Torben Giehler and Erik Parker. Beginning in 2005, approximately two hundred of Majerus's works have been displayed as the European Retrospective travelling exhibition. The exhibition was a collaboration between the Majerus family and the Galerie Neugerriemschneider, Berlin. It included works usually displayed at the Hamburger Bahnhof, Berlin, the Universalmuseum Joanneum, Graz and from private collections throughout the world (including Argentina, Austria, Belgium, Spain, Germany, Great-Britain, Greece, Italy, Luxembourg, Mexico, Portugal, USA).

In 2018, the Institute of Contemporary Art Boston included a painting by Majerus in a survey of art after the internet, placing it within the context of works by Jon Rafman, Cao Fei, Avery Singer, and others. His first museum survey in the United States opened at the ICA Miami in 2022. Opening twenty years after the death was the exhibition series called Michel Majerus 2022 which was presented at the KW Institute for Contemporary Art, Neuer Berliner Kunstverein and Kunstverein in Hamburg.

== Death ==
In November 2002, Majerus was killed aboard Luxair Flight 9642 while travelling from Berlin to Luxembourg.

== Influence ==
In 2013, artist Thomas Bayrle played with elements from two of Majerus's paintings to create a silk-screened wallpaper titled Majerus (Smudge Tool/XXX) I. In 2020, Takashi Murakami made paintings that borrow from some of Majerus's imagery.

In 2024, the Michel Majerus Estate presented a project called Let's Play Majerus G3 based on Majerus's Power Macintosh G3 computer from his archive. It was organized by artist Cory Arcangel in cooperation with the digital art organization Rhizome.
