= List of regional airliners =

The following is a list of commercial short-haul civilian passenger "regional" airliners with significant build numbers. Regional airliners typically seat fewer than 100 passengers and fill the short-hop role in the hub and spoke model of passenger and cargo distribution as well as taking part in point-to-point transit and fly up to 810 miles.

== Current in production ==
Model	Type	Seats	Seats /row	Intro.	Prod. end	Built	Country	In service (Note: July 2020) (orders)
Airbus A220	Jet	108-160	5	2016	in prod.	435	Canada	435 (506)
ATR 42	Turboprop	40-52	4	1985	in prod.	470	France & Italy	251 (20)
ATR 72	Turboprop	68-74	4	1989	in prod.	1000	France & Italy	879 (118)
De Havilland Canada Dash 8	Turboprop	37-90	4	1984	in prod.	1244	Canada	830 (15)
Britten-Norman Islander	Utility	9	2	1967	in prod.	1280	UK	(?)
CASA C-212 Aviocar	Utility	26	3	1974	in prod.	583	Spain	(?)
CASA/IPTN CN-235	Turboprop	51	4	1988	in prod.	341	Spain & Indonesia	(?)
Cessna 208	Utility	13	3	1984	in prod.	2,500	USA	(?)
Cessna 408 SkyCourier	Utility	19	3	2022	in prod.	5	USA	3 (53)
Comac C909	Jet	78-105	5	2016	in prod.	169	China	146 (306)
DHC-6 Twin Otter (Viking -400)	Utility	19	3	2010	in prod.	141	Canada	315 (8)
Dornier 228/Dornier 228NG	Utility	19	2	1982	in prod.	370	Germany	60
Embraer E-Jet E2 family	Jet	80-146	4	2018	in prod.	108	Brazil	108 (198)
Embraer E-Jet family	Jet	66-124	4	2004	in prod.	1677	Brazil	1677 (101)
Harbin Y-12	Utility	17	3	1985	in prod.	105 (?)	China	(?)
Ilyushin Il-114	Turboprop	52–64	4	1998	in prod.	20	Russia	(?)
Let L-410 Turbolet	Utility	19	3	1970	in prod.	1200	Czech Republic	178 (3)
PZL M28 Skytruck	Utility	18	3	1993	in prod.	39	Poland	(?)
Sukhoi Superjet 100	Jet	87-108	5	2011	in prod.	159	Russia	131 (45)
Tecnam P2012 Traveller	Utility	9	2	2020	in prod.	35	Italy	35? (45?)
Xian Y-7 / MA60 / MA600	Turboprop	52–62	4	1984	in prod.	231	China	51 (30)

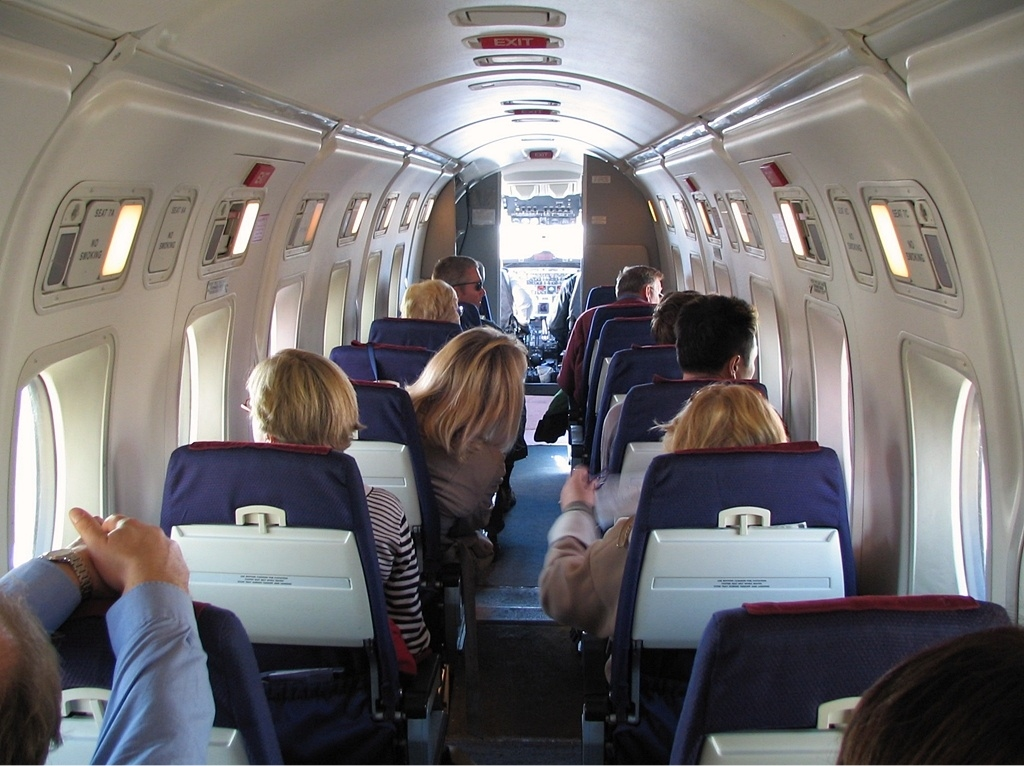
Beech 1900D two-abreast cabin.

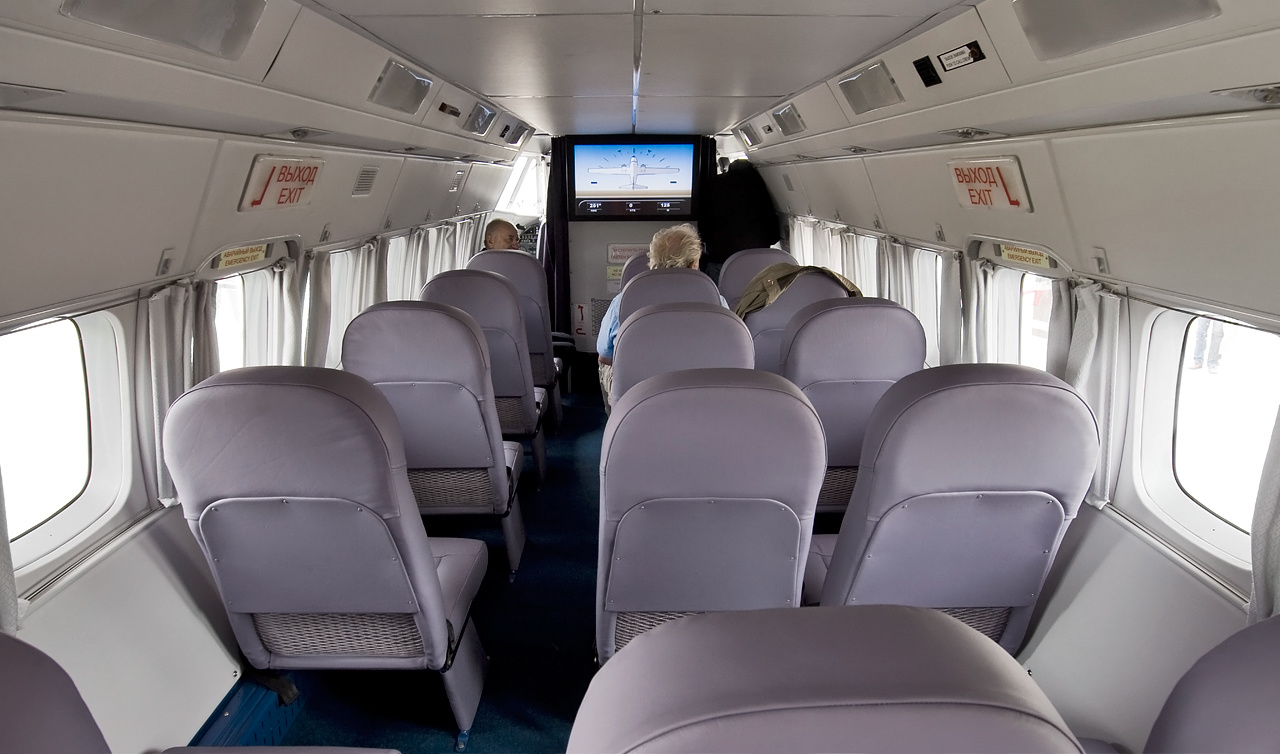
Let L-410 three-abreast cabin.

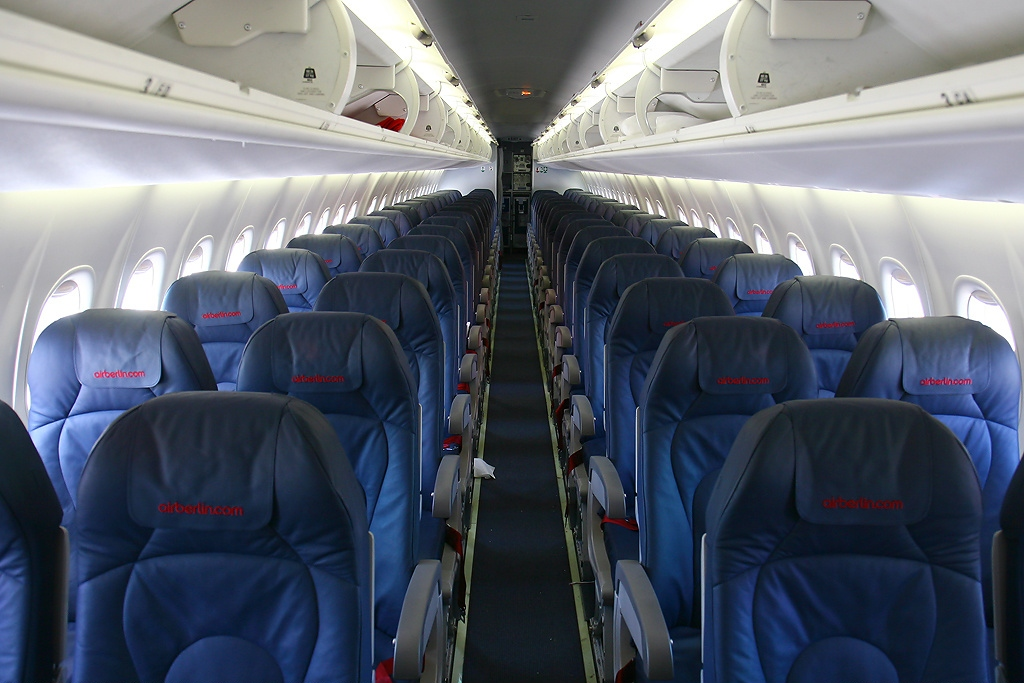
Dash 8 four-abreast cabin.

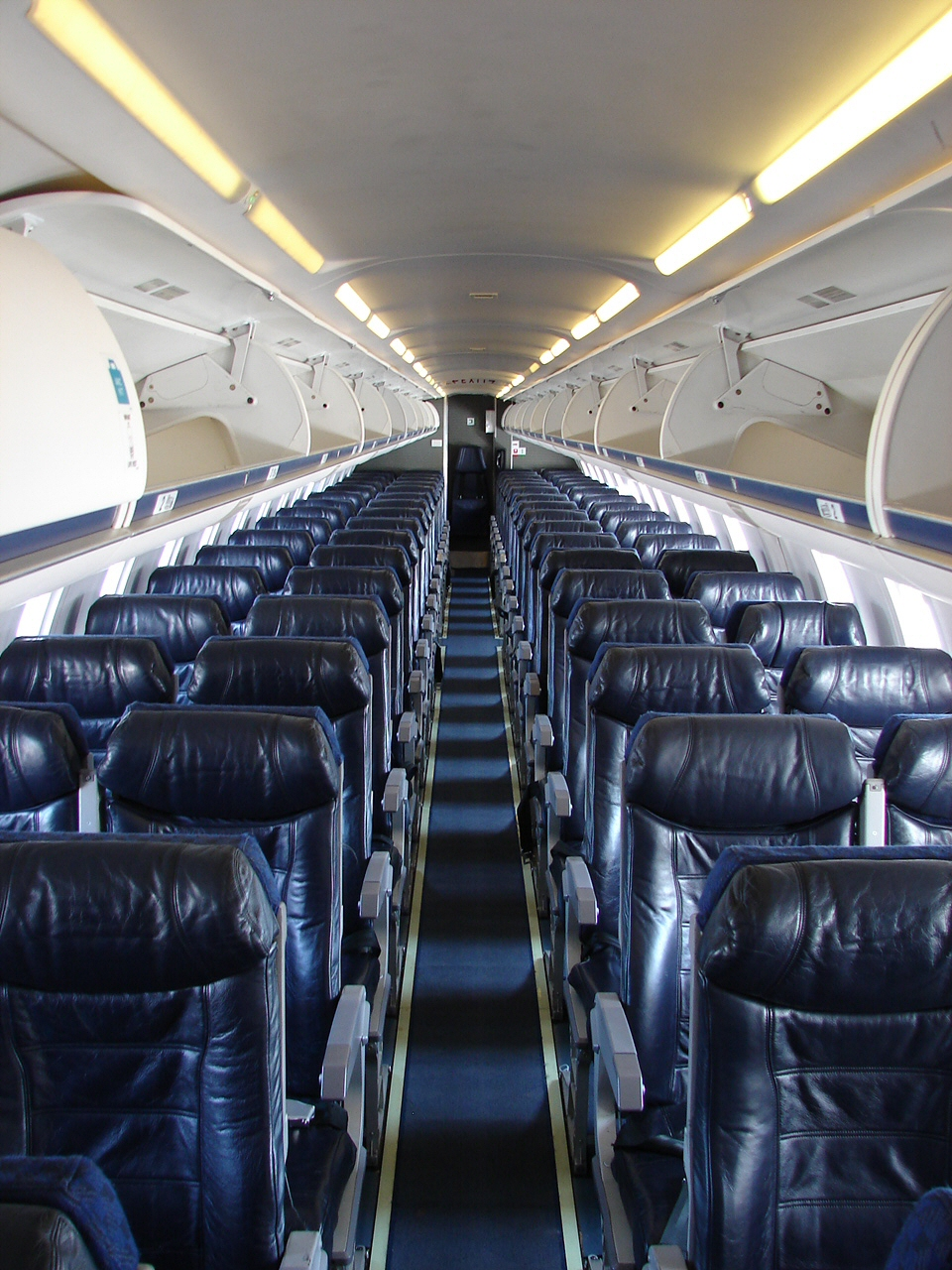
Bombardier CRJ four-abreast cabin.

== Planned ==
Model	Type	Seats	Seats /row	Intro.	Built	Country	In service (orders)
D328eco	Turboprop	40		EIS 2027		Germany	
NAL Saras	Turboprop	19	2	2025 (planned)	2	India	60 planned
HAL/NAL Indian Regional Jet	Turboprop	80-100		2026-27 (planned)		India	

== Out of production ==
Model	Type	Seats	Seats /row	Intro.	Prod. end	Built	Country	In service
Antonov An-24	Turboprop	40-50	4	1962	2012	1264	USSR	97
Antonov An-140	Turboprop	52	4	2002	2016	35	Ukraine / Russia / Iran	1
Antonov An-148	Jet	68–99	5	2009	in prod.	42	Ukraine / Russia	7
BAe 146/Avro RJ	Jet	70-112	5	1983	2001	387	UK	119
BAe ATP	Turboprop	64	4	1988	1996	64	UK	20
BAe Jetstream	Utility	19	3	1982	1993	386	UK	101
BAe Jetstream 41	Turboprop	29-30	3	1992	1997	100	UK	54
Beechcraft 1900	Utility	19	2	1984	2002	695	USA	341
Beechcraft Model 99	Turboprop	15	2	1968	1987	700	USA	107
Boeing 717	Jet	106-117	5	1999	2006	156	USA	145
Bombardier CRJ100/200	Jet	50	4	1992	2006	1021	Canada	621
Bombardier CRJ700/900/1000	Jet	66-104	4	2001	2020	924	Canada	825 (12)
Britten-Norman Trislander	Utility	16-17	2	1971	1982	72	UK	4
de Havilland Canada Dash 7	Turboprop	50	4	1978	1988	113	Canada	21
DHC-6 Twin Otter (-100/-200/-300)	Utility	19-20	3	1966	1988	844	Canada	230
Dornier 328	Turboprop	30-33	3	1991	2004	217	Germany	108
Douglas DC-3	Turboprop	32	3	1936	1942	607	USA	3
Embraer EMB 110 Bandeirante	Utility	15-21	3	1973	1990	501	Brazil	39
Embraer EMB 120 Brasilia	Turboprop	30	3	1985	2001	354	Brazil	127
Embraer ERJ family	Jet	37–50	3	1997	2020	1240	Brazil	610
Fairchild Swearingen Metroliner	Turboprop	19	2	1972	2001	600+	USA	220
Fairchild Dornier 328JET	Jet	30-33	3	1999	2004	110	Germany	50
Dornier 328 TP	Turboprop	30-33	3	1991	2000	110	Germany	58
Fokker 100	Jet	97-122	5	1988	1997	283	Netherlands	109
Fokker 50	Turboprop	58	4	1987	1997	213	Netherlands	105
Fokker 70	Jet	72-85	5	1994	1997	48	Netherlands	37
Fokker F27 Friendship	Turboprop	48-56	4	1958	1987	586	Netherlands	10
GAF Nomad	Utility	12	2	1975	1985	172	Australia	2
Hawker Siddeley HS 748	Turboprop	40-58	4	1962	1988	380	UK	15
McDonnell Douglas DC-9	Jet	80-135	5	1965	1982	976	USA	34
Saab 2000	Turboprop	50-58	3	1994	1999	63	Sweden	16
Saab 340	Turboprop	34	3	1984	1999	459	Sweden	230
Yakovlev Yak-40	Jet	32	4	1968	1981	1011	Russia	20
Yakovlev Yak-42	Jet	104-120	6	1980	2003	185	USSR / Russia	28

== Historical ==
Model	Type	Seats	Seats /row	Intro.	Prod. end	Built	Country
Aérospatiale N 262	Utility	23-29	3	1964	1976	110	France
Airspeed Ambassador	Utility	60	5	1951	1953	23	UK
Antonov An-28	Utility	18	3	1986	1993	191	USSR
Breguet 941	Turboprop	56	4	1967	1974	6	France
de Havilland Dove	Utility	8	2	1946	1967	542	UK
de Havilland Heron	Utility	14	2	1950	1963	150	UK
Douglas DC-1	Piston	10	2	1933	1933	1	USA
Douglas DC-2	Piston	14	2	1934	1939	198	USA
Douglas DC-4	Piston	80	4	1942	1947	80	USA
Douglas DC-5	Piston	16-22	4	1940	1949	12	USA
Douglas DC-6	Piston	20	4	1946	1958	704	USA
Douglas DC-7	Piston	30	4	1953	1958	338	USA
Fokker F28 Fellowship	Jet	55-70	5	1969	1987	241	Netherlands
Handley Page Dart Herald	Turboprop	47-56	4	1961	1968	50	UK
Handley Page Jetstream	Utility	16	3	1969	1975	66	UK
IAI Arava	Utility	20-24	4	1972	1988	80	Israel
Mitsubishi MU-2	Utility	4-12	2	1963	1986	704	Japan
NAMC YS-11	Turboprop	64	4	1965	1974	182	Japan
Saab 90 Scandia	Utility	24-32	3	1950	1954	18	Sweden
Short 330	Turboprop	30	3	1976	1992	125	UK
Short 360	Turboprop	36	3	1982	1991	165	UK
Short SC.7 Skyvan	Utility	19	3	1963	1986	153	UK
VFW-Fokker 614	Jet	40-44	4	1975	1977	19	Germany

== See also ==
- Short haul
- List of commercial jet airliners
