= Regional airliner =

Small airliner

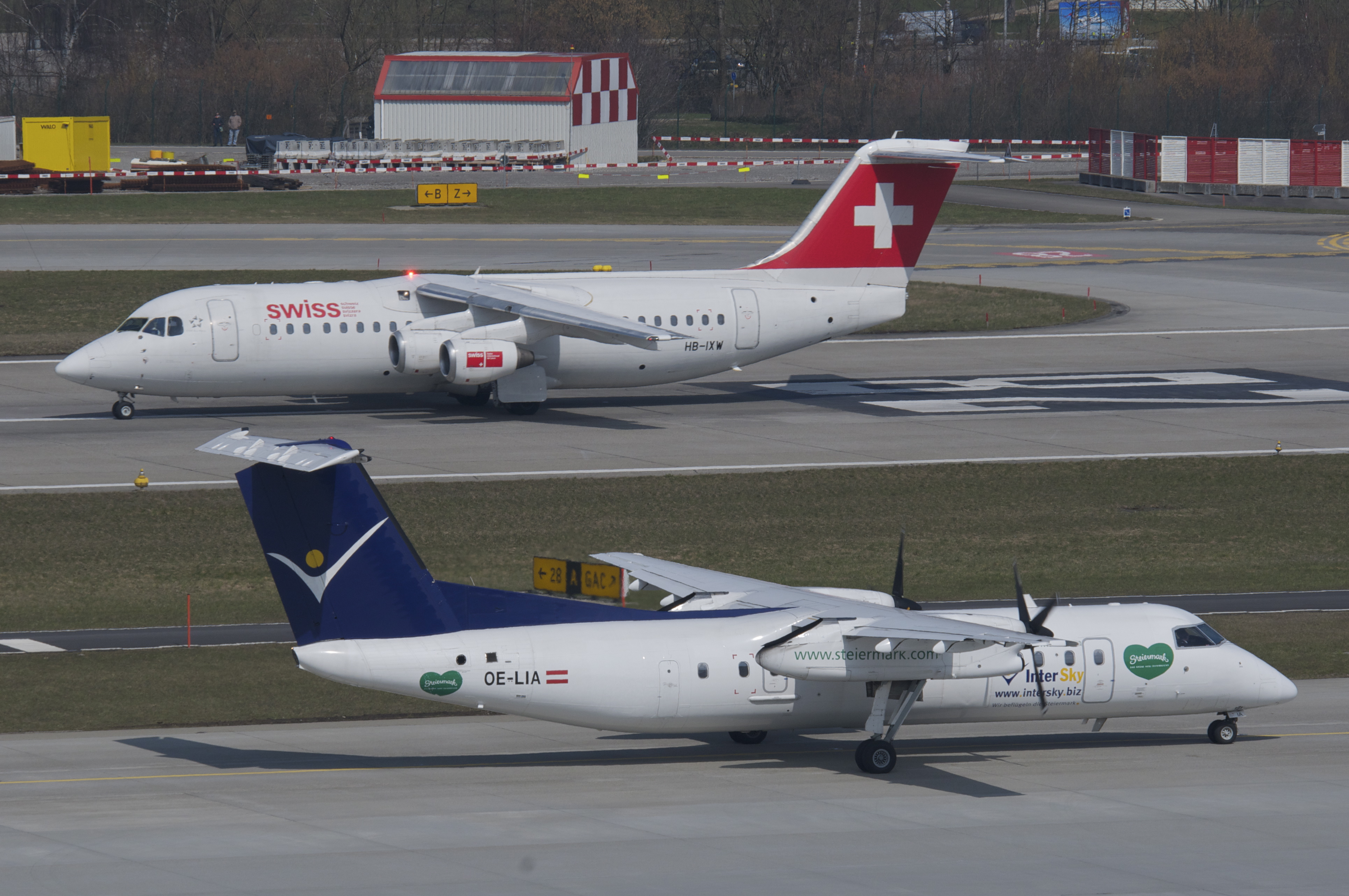
A Dash 8 in front of a BAe 146

A regional airliner, commuter airliner or feeder liner is a small airliner that is designed to fly up to 100 passengers on short-haul flights, usually feeding larger carriers' airline hubs from small markets. This class of airliners is typically flown by the regional airlines that are either contracted by or subsidiaries of the larger airlines. Regional airliners are used for short trips between smaller towns or from a larger city to a smaller city. Feeder liner, commuter, and local service are all alternative terms for the same class of flight operations.

== History ==
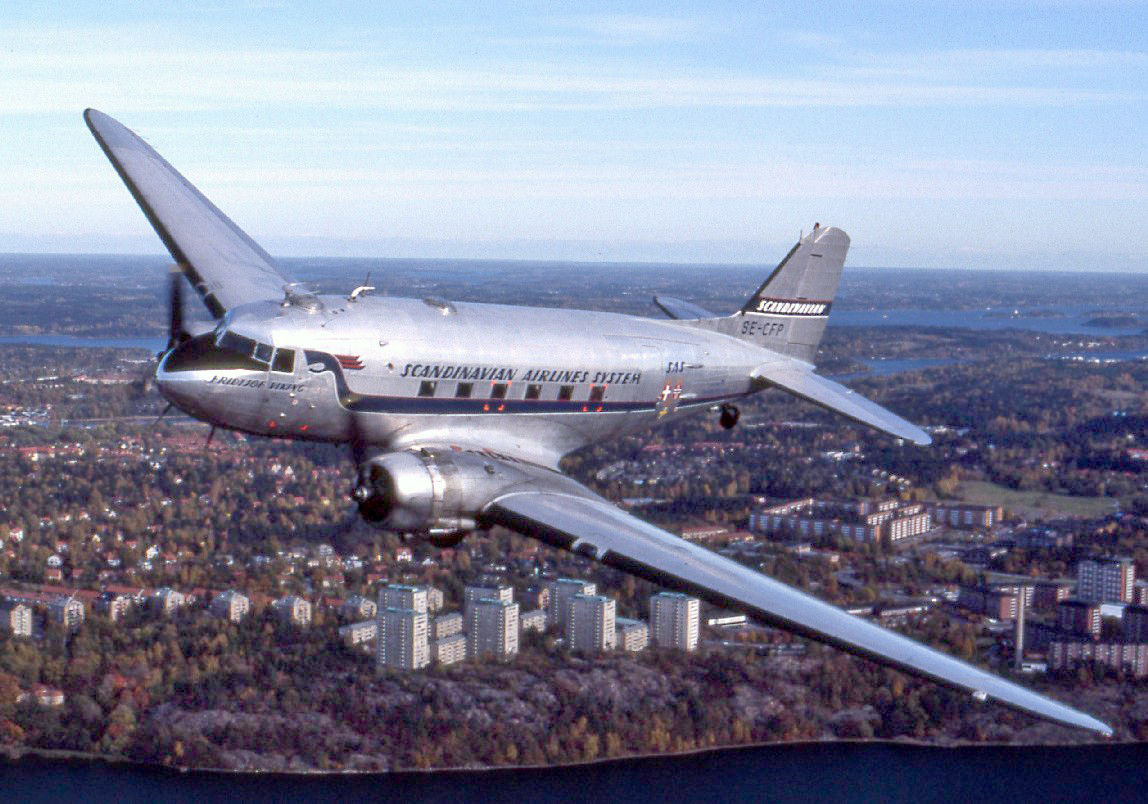
The Douglas DC-3 first flew in 1935 and had a range of around 1,000 miles (1,625 kilometers.)

To keep short routes economical, airlines preferred using second hand aircraft than costlier new aircraft. Older aircraft were put into short haul service as they were replaced by new longer-range designs.

=== Post-war era ===
Propeller aircraft of larger airlines were transferred to smaller airlines. Examples included the De Havilland Dragon Rapide biplane and the Douglas DC-3s, in large surplus after the war, which the aircraft manufacturers wanted to replace.

The first piston-powered airliners with 40 seats were the Martin 2-0-2s (introduced in 1947) and Convair CV-240s (1948).

=== Turboprop designs ===
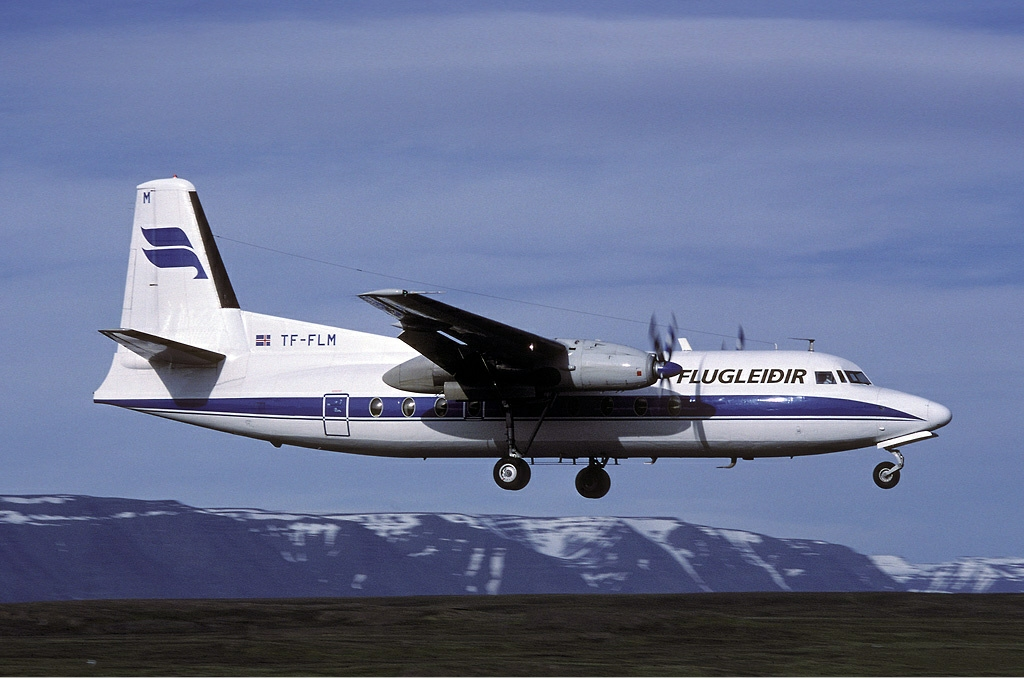
The Fokker F27 Friendship was introduced in November 1958

The first turboprop powered aircraft emerged like the Vickers Viscount (75 seats, introduced in 1953) and Fokker F27 (44–52 seats, 1958). Some smaller turboprop airliners were developed in the 1960s like the British Shorts Skyvan (19 seats, 1963), and French Nord 262 (29 seats, 1964) or Brazilian Embraer EMB 110 Bandeirante (1973). This "hand-me-down" process of supplying aircraft continued with designs like the Convair 440 and Douglas DC-6 also serving in this role while the first jets were introduced.

By the mid-1950s, demand for even more economical designs led to the production of the first custom feeder liners. These were almost always turboprops, which had fuel economy on par with piston engine designs, but had far lower maintenance costs. Often, the time between engine overhaul periods was five times that of the best piston engines. Early examples of these designs include the Fokker F27 Friendship, Avro 748, and Handley Page Dart Herald.

These designs were so successful that it was to be many years before newer designs bettered them enough to make it worthwhile in terms of capital investment to develop. Among the first purpose-built airliners developed for the CAB sanctioned local-service airlines in the US, the predecessors of the modern regional airliner industry; was the interim and custom-built Fairchild F-27/FH-227's for the needs of these smaller but expanding airlines of the late 1960s.

There were a few other exceptions, generally tailored to more specific roles. For instance, the Handley Page Jetstream (first flight in 1968) was intended for fewer passengers at much higher speeds, displacing smaller designs like the Beechcraft Queen Air. The Fairchild/Swearingen Metro (developed from the original Queen Air through a number of stages) filled a similar niche.

By the 1970s, the first-generation regional airliners were starting to wear out, but there had been little effort in producing new designs for this market. A varied list of light transport aircraft supplanted by newer and more modern 30-seat designs by Shorts with their Shorts 330 and 360 as well as other aircraft manufacturers, replaced and sometimes provided growth to established commuter markets. Additional development came to the regional airline industry with the arrival of some of the earlier De Havilland Canada types such as the Dash 7 delivered in 1978, but this was tailored more to the short-range and STOL (Short Take-Off and Landing) role than as a regional airliner. Feedback from the airlines was fairly consistent, and De Havilland responded with the Dash 8 in 1984, which had economic benefits over the earlier generation machines and was faster and quieter as well.

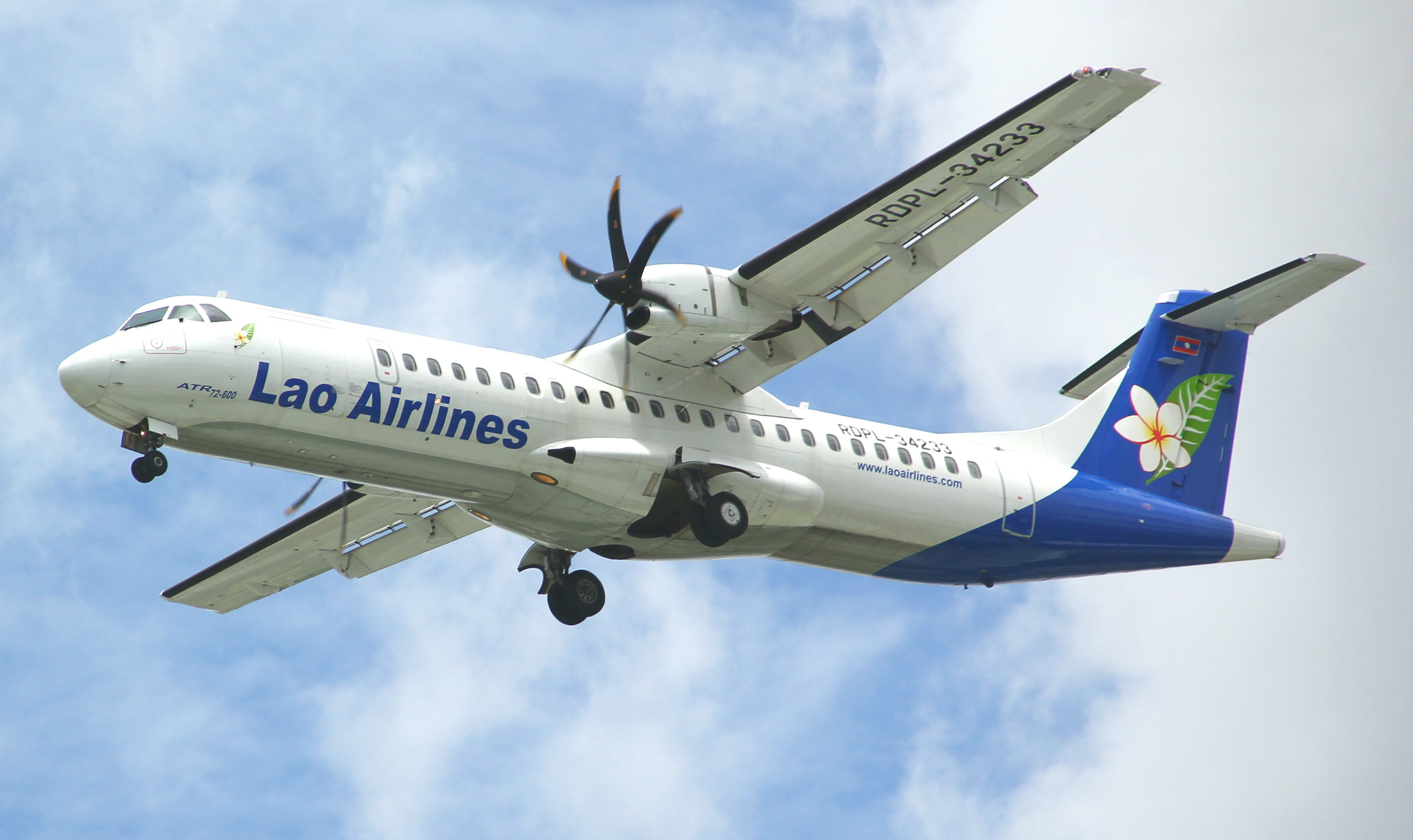
The ATR 72 was introduced in October 1989

In the early 1980s, the Dash 8's success sparked off development of a number of similar designs, including the ATR 42/72, Saab 340, Embraer Brasilia and Fokker 50. Consequently, there were a relatively large number of aircraft offered by manufacturers in this sector of the market, pushing older 1950s designs from Fokker, Vickers and others into retirement. Due to the high level of competition, production of a number of these types ceased. Saab AB exited the civil aviation market and wrote its debts off, Daimler-Benz Aerospace "pulled the plug" on Dornier, and British Aerospace ended production of their BAe Jetstream 41 after 100 delivered. By 2006 only the ATR 42/72 models and the Dash 8 remained in production.

Turboprop airliner deliveries are correlated with oil prices with a lag of a few years.

In 2018, 245.4 million two-way seats were offered on turboprop flights, up from 201.4 million in 2009, with 97% of flights below 500 nmi (930 km) and 87% below 300 nmi (560 km), and an average capacity increasing to 51 seats from 44 seats in 2009. The largest user was Air Canada with 12.7 million seats, followed by Flybe with 10.3 million and Wings Air with 9.24 million. Canada was the largest market with 30.5 million seats, then Indonesia with 14.3 and the US with 13.4. The busiest turboprop airport was Vancouver (2.75 Million seats) followed by Toronto Pearson (2.64) then Seattle-Tacoma (2.39).

=== Noise ===
Although turboprops are quiet to outside observers, prop wash makes them noisy inside. Active noise reduction should reduce the cabin noise of the Bombardier Q400 or the ATR 72-600.

=== Market forecast ===
Flight Global fleet forecasts for the 2016–2035 period estimate 3,081 turboprop deliveries with a $63 billion value and 4,042 regional jet deliveries for a $130 billion value. Embraer claims crossover regional jets are more cost-efficient than current turboprops beyond 200 nmi (370 km), routes that represented 45% of 70-seat turboprops flights in 2017. This has led Widerøe to deploy Embraer E-Jet E2s on longer routes (except for destinations with short runways and severe weather conditions north of the Arctic Circle) and AirBaltic to replace its fleet of 12 Dash 8 Q400s with Airbus 220s. From 2018 to 2037, ATR forecasts 3,020 turboprop deliveries: 630 with 40–60 seats and 2,390 with 61–80 seats.

=== Hybrid aircraft ===
As legacy regional aircraft are used on very short sectors like connecting islands, their replacements could be hybrid or electric aircraft. Hybrid-electric aircraft propulsion remains impeded by energy storage, high-power electric distribution and the lack of certification framework. ATR Aircraft dismiss a fully electric propulsion as carrying the same payload over the same distances as an 18 t (40,000 lb) ATR 42, current batteries would weigh 21 t (46,000 lb).

Current projects are small 10-seaters, like the Israeli Eviation Alice or the Boeing-backed Zunum Aero ZA12 powered by a Safran Ardiden turboshaft and targeting 40-80% lower operating costs. The French VoltAero Cassio based on the Cessna 337 Skymaster like the U.S. Ampaire, U.S. Wright Electric works with Spain’s Axter Aerospace to re-engine a nine-seater and the Cessna Caravan is re-engined with a MagniX electric motor. United Technologies is re-engining a Dash 8 Q100 on one side with a 1 MW (1,300 hp) gas turbine and a 1 MW (1,300 hp) electric motor instead of the current 2,150 hp (1.60 MW) Pratt & Whitney Canada PW121, for at least 30% energy savings.

A project of larger scale is currently under development by Swedish startup company, Heart Aerospace, which is aiming to build a 30-seater hybrid-electric regional airliner, the ES-30. The company revealed its demonstrator aircraft in 2024, the Heart X1, and is expected to undertake electric flight mid-2025.

== Design ==
=== Turboprop regional aircraft ===
Regional airlines serving small hubs or airports with short runways will often use turboprop aircraft with propeller engines versus jet engines. de Havilland Canada (Dash 7 and Dash 8), Antonov (An-24 and An-140), Xi'an Aircraft Industrial Corporation (MA60, MA600 and MA700) and ATR (ATR 42 and ATR 72) are manufacturers of this type.

=== Regional jets ===
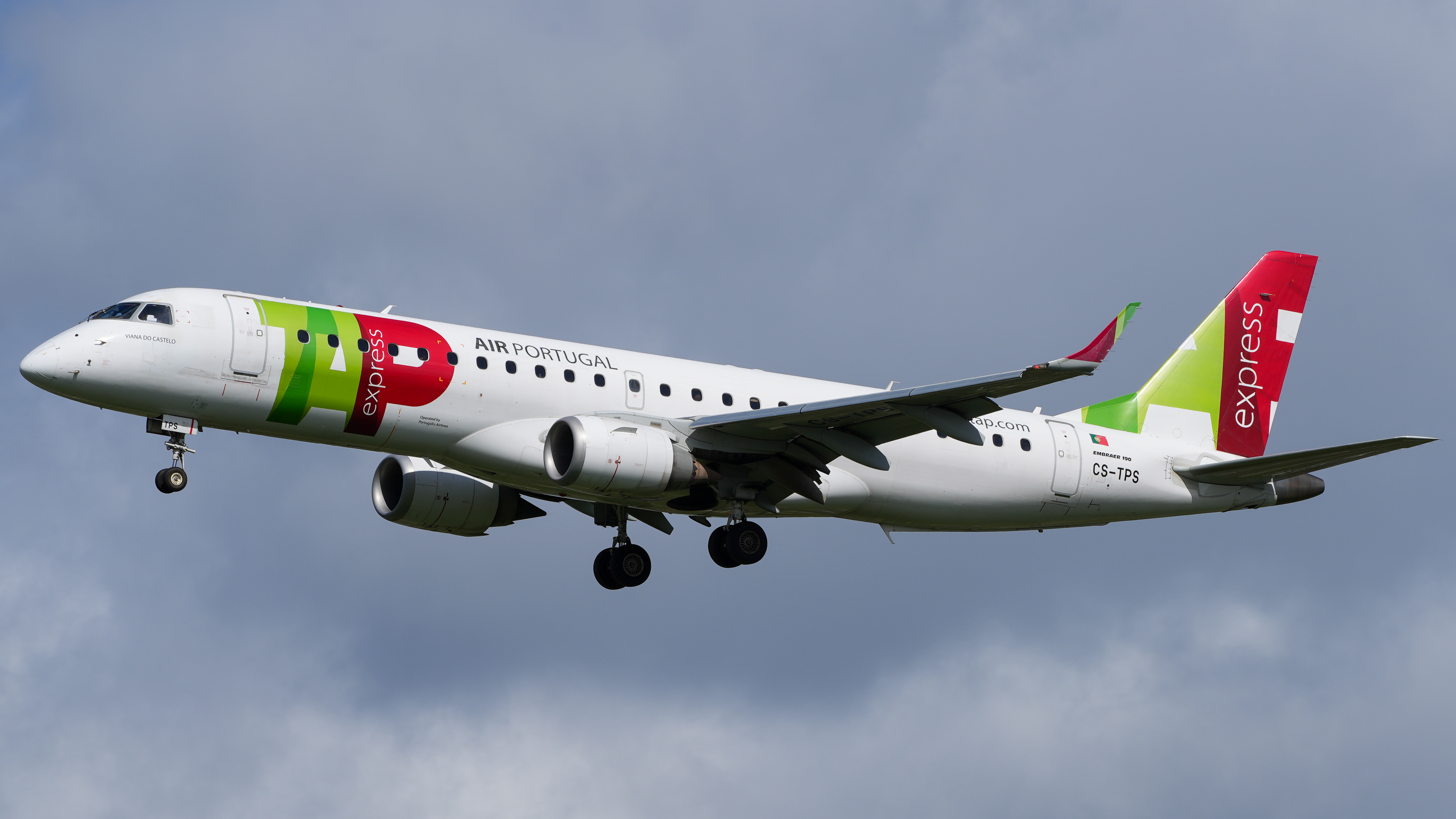
The Embraer E-Jet family is one of the most delivered regional jets still in production as of July 2024

A regional jet (RJ) is a jet airliner with less than 100 seats. The first one was the Sud-Aviation Caravelle in 1959, followed by the widespread Yakovlev Yak-40, Fokker F-28 and BAe 146. The 1990s saw the emergence of the Canadair Regional Jet and its Embraer Regional Jet counterpart, then the larger Embraer E-Jet family and multiple competing projects. In the US, they are limited in size by scope clauses.

=== Accommodation ===
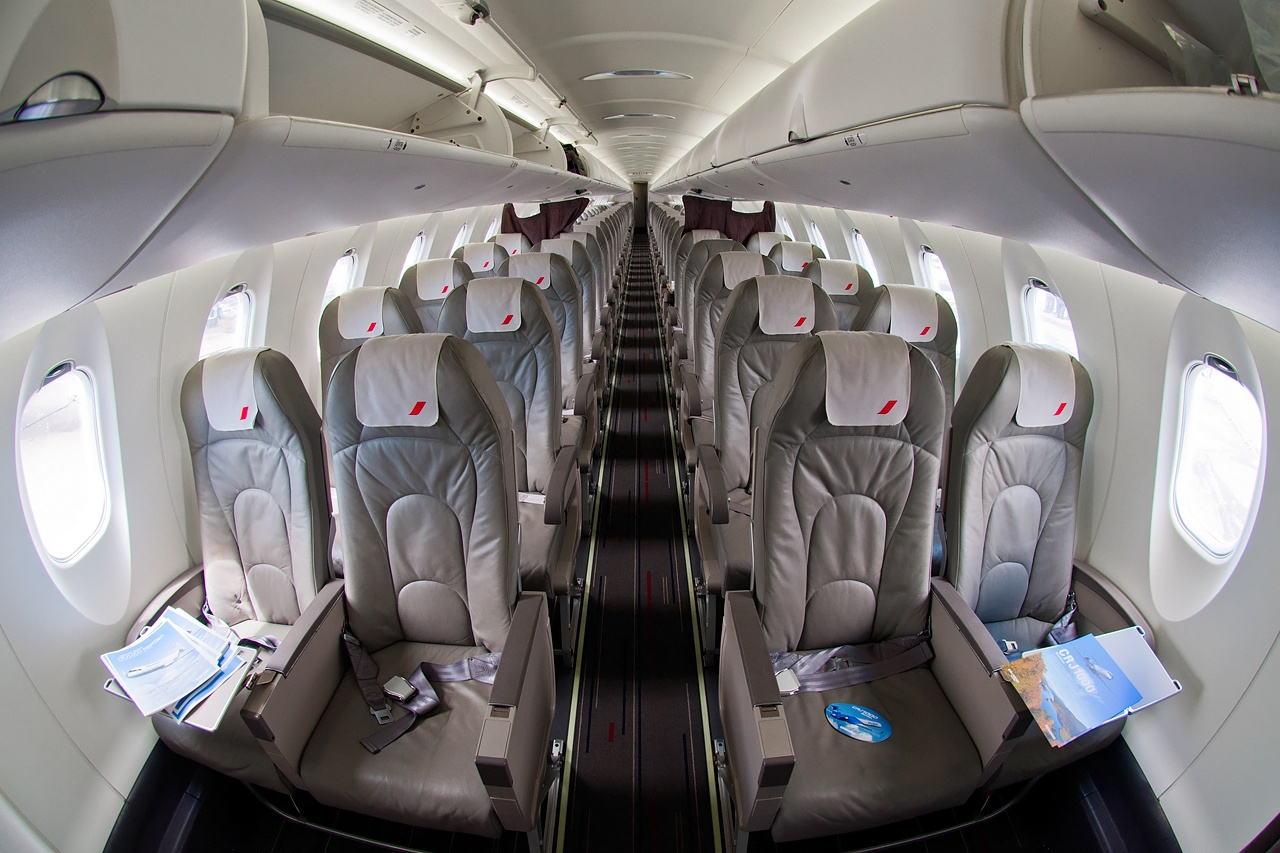
Four-abreast cabin seating of a CRJ1000 NextGen

Seating on regional airliners tends to be narrow and tight, and passengers typically are restricted from bringing on board carry-on items which would fit without difficulty in the overhead bins of larger aircraft. Often carry-on luggage is collected immediately prior to boarding and placed in the cargo hold, where it can be quickly retrieved by the ground staff while the passengers exit. Compared with bigger planes, many frequent fliers find regional jets cabins cramped and uncomfortable, with a lower ceiling, tight seating and single-class cabins forbidding a first-class upgrade.

== In production aircraft ==
Regional airliners
Model	First flight	Net orders	Deliveries	Backlog	MTOW (t)	seats	Range (nmi)
An-148/158/An-178	17/12/2004	54	35	19	41.9–52.4	68–99	1,350–2,160
AVIC MA60/MA600/MA700	25/02/2000	143	97	46	21.8–26.5	60–86	770–1,460
ATR 42-600	04/03/2010	528	503	25	18.6	48	720
ATR 72-600/600F	24/07/2009	1247	1217	30	23	70–78	830
De Havilland Canada Dash 8-400	31/01/1998	1316	1258	58	28.0–29.5	74–90	700–1,110
Comac ARJ21-700/900	28/11/2008	252	137	115	40.5–43.6	78–98	1,200
Embraer E-Jet/E-Jet E2	19/02/2002	2180	1803	396	38.6–61.5	66–146	2,150–2,850
Superjet 100	19/05/2008	386	206	180	49.4	98	2,390
Ilyushin Il-114-300					23.5	64	1,030

== See also ==
- List of regional airliners
- Regional jet
