= AVIC Aircraft =

AVIC Aircraft may refer to following subsidiaries under the Aviation Industry Corporation of China (AVIC):

- AVIC Chengdu Aircraft Corporation
- AVIC Harbin Aircraft Industry Group
- AVIC Hongdu Aviation Industry Corporation
- AVIC Guizhou Aircraft Industry Corporation
- AVIC Shaanxi Aircraft Corporation
- AVIC Shenyang Aircraft Corporation
- AVIC Xi'an Aircraft Industry Group
