= Merpati Nusantara Airlines Flight 6517 =

2013 aviation accident in Indonesia

Accident
- Date: 10 June 2013
- Summary: Crashed on landing due to pilot error
- Site: El Tari Airport, Kupang, Indonesia

Aircraft
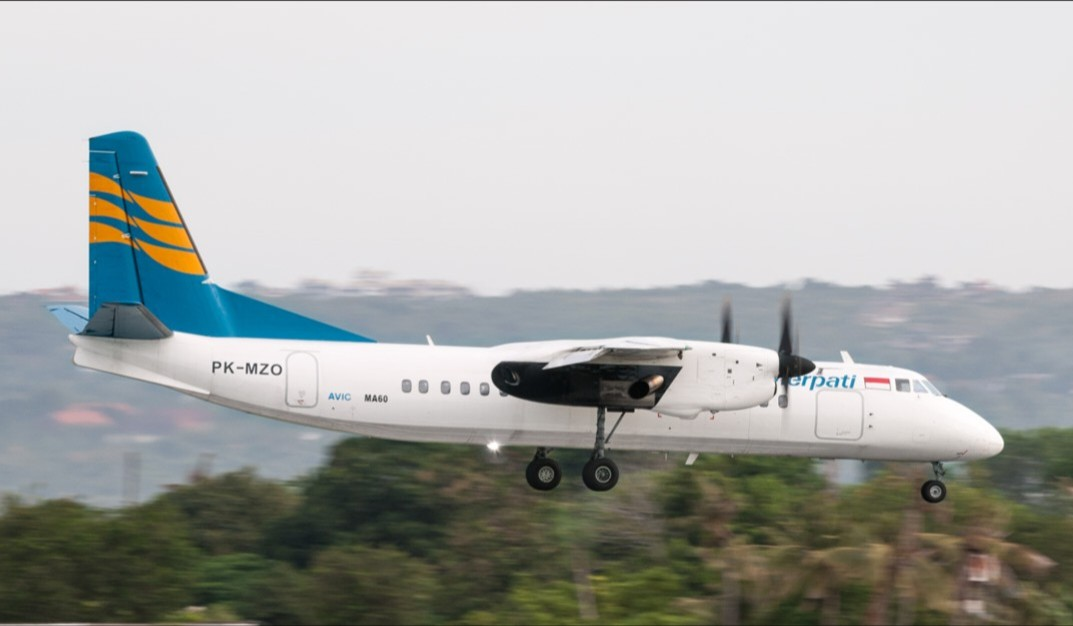
- PK-MZO, the aircraft involved in the accident, seen in 2011
- Aircraft type: Xian MA60
- Operator: Merpati Nusantara Airlines
- IATA flight No.: MZ6517
- ICAO flight No.: MNA6517
- Call sign: MERPATI 6517
- Registration: PK-MZO
- Flight origin: Turelelo Soa Airport, Bajawa, Indonesia
- Destination: El Tari Airport, Kupang, Indonesia
- Occupants: 50
- Passengers: 46
- Crew: 4
- Fatalities: 0
- Injuries: 25
- Survivors: 50

Merpati Nusantara Airlines Flight 6517 was a scheduled domestic passenger flight from Bajawa to Kupang, Indonesia. On 10 June 2013, the Xian MA60 twin turboprop operating the route crashed on the runway while landing at Kupang's El Tari Airport, injuring 25 occupants, five seriously. The aircraft was severely damaged in the impact and subsequently written off.

Investigation by the National Transportation Safety Committee, assisted by Chinese Civil Aviation Administration of China, concluded that the flight crew's mismanagement of the engine controls led to a loss of propeller thrust and lift shortly before touchdown, resulting in a hard landing far in excess of the airframe's structural limits.

== Accident ==
Flight 6517 departed Bajawa Turulelo Soa Airport at 09.00 a.m local time carrying 46 passengers and 4 crews on board with an ETA of 9:40 a.m. The flight was uneventful until its landing. First Officer Au Young Vunpin was the pilot flying and Captain Aditya Pri Joewono was the Pilot Monitoring. At 09:22, the flight crews made first communication with El Tari Control Tower controller (El Tari Tower) and reported their position and maintaining 11,500 ft. The pilot received information that the runway in use was 07 and the weather information. Flight 6517 later descended approved their descent clearance of 5.000 ft. At 09.38 local time, the crew reported the aircraft was passing 10,500 ft and stated that the flight was on Visual Meteorological Condition (VMC). El Tari Airport then obtained visual contact with Flight 6517 and issued a landing clearance. At 09.51 a.m, the crew reported that their position was on final and the El Tari Tower re-issued the landing clearance. Flight 6517 then extended its landing gear.

At 10.15 a.m, Flight 6517 bounced three times and slammed onto the tarmac. It broke into two sections. Both the left wing and the right wing were bent forward (the entire wing structure was separated intact from the fuselage which collapsed under its own weight) and both propellers were destroyed. Eyewitness recalled that there was a massive explosion when the crash occurred. It then skidded for several meters. After the aircraft stopped, the flight attendants assessed the situation and decided to evacuate the passengers through the rear main entrance door.

A total of 25 people were injured in the crash. One pilot and four passengers who seated on row number three, seven and eight suffered serious injury. Several injured passengers suffered shock from the crash and was taken into El Tari's VVIP Lounge. Several people were admitted to the airport's military hospital, the Kupang Military Hospital, located on the west of the airport. Several of the injured were taken to the Prof. Dr. WZ Johannes Public Hospital. Military personnel immediately assisted the survivors and sterilized the crash site.

== Aircraft ==
The aircraft involved in the crash was a Xian MA60 registered in Indonesia as PK-MZO with a serial number of MSN 608. It was powered by two Pratt & Whitney Canada PW127J. It had its first flight in 2010 with a total airframe hours of 4.486 and cycles of 4.133. The aircraft was delivered to Merpati Nusantara Airlines in 2010.

== Passengers and crews ==
Nationality	Passengers	Crew	Total
Indonesia	45	3	48
United States	1	0	1
Malaysia	0	1	1
Total	46	4	50

Flight 6517 was carrying 50 passengers and crews, with all except two on board, one passenger and one flight crew, were Indonesians. One passenger was an American citizen, identified as Aloysius Deene. The co-pilot was a Malaysian. However, various media falsely reported the co-pilot nationality as South Korea. The pilot of the flight was identified as Aditya Pri Joewono and the co-pilot was identified as Au Young Vunpin. Captain Aditya joined the company on 1 November 1994. He had a total flying hours of 12.530 hours, in which 2.050 hours of them were on the Xian MA60. Captain Aditya was qualified as route instructor and has been performed approximately 218 instructing flight hours. First Officer Vunpin was new to the company and had just acquired a total flying hours of 58 hours. Merpati spokesman stated that First Officer Vunpin was still in training, having joined the company for only 3 months.First Officer Vunpin was on training program with approximately 141 hours, including 24 hours as observer. The operator had planned to checked First Officer Vunpin to be a qualified first officer on the next schedule but he requested another multi days schedule to be more confident prior to flight check.

== Aftermath ==
Immediately after the crash, El Tari Airport was closed by the airport operators, as well as the local authorities, meaning that no flights could either depart or arrive at the airfield. The airport was closed for an extended time and would be reopened when the wreckage of the incident aircraft was removed. At least 7 flights were delayed, and several other flights were diverted. Every flight was cancelled that was scheduled between 10p.m. and 6a.m. The wreckage of the incident aircraft was hastily removed from the runway, allowing the airfield to reopen.

Transportation Ministry stated that Merpati Nusantara Airlines would face a "special audit" in response to the crash. Only 8 Xian MA60 operated by Merpati were allowed to fly. As such, the ministry would check the airworthiness of Merpati's Xian MA60 fleet. The Ministry would check on the maintenance and spare parts. Merpati lost approximately Rp. 100 billion due to the crash, causing more economic problems in the airline which forced the airline to suspend operations 8 months later.

== Investigation ==
The Vice Minister of Transportation Ministry Bambang Susanto immediately ordered three main things in response to the crash, which were evacuation process of the survivors, immediate investigation by the National Transportation Safety Committee, and immediate clean-up at El Tari Airport.

Most survivors stated that before the plane touched the runway, the aircraft "swayed and shook" for several times. Shortly afterwards the aircraft bounced and slammed onto the tarmac. Investigators then analysed the FDR and CVR. The FDR was downloaded in Surabaya on 13 June with good quality. Further analysis was conducted in Jakarta. Based on the FDR analysis of the flight's approach, the approach was not on profile as published for runway 07, while the approach angle greater than 2.9°. Investigators then noticed that the left power lever was in the range of BETA MODE while the aircraft altitude was approximately 112 ft and followed by the right power lever at 90 ft until hit the ground. The FDR also recorded a vertical acceleration of +5.99 G followed by -2.76 G and stopped recording 0.297 seconds after touchdown. The CVR was downloaded at NTSC facility on 12 June 2013 and contained 120 minutes of good quality recording. The audio files were examined found to contain the accident flight. The recording showed that First Officer Vunping intended to reduce the power to correct the speed. Then, sounds similar to changing of engine and propeller were heard in the recording. First Officer Vunpin then exclaimed "Oops", possibly realizing his mistake. The aircraft then impacted terrain.

Noticed by the abnormal situation on the thrust lever, investigators then examined it. The power levers should have prevented to move from flight idle to ground idle during flight by the function of Electric Magnetic Lock Systems and Mechanical Power Lever Stop Slot. At the accident aircraft was found that the electric magnetic lock system (Power Lever lock) was on open position. With power lever lock on open position, the solenoid of the electric magnetic lock system disengage and allow the power lever moves to ground idle in flight whenever the mechanical power lever stop slots lifted. Based on simulator test conducted by the NTSC, if the engine entered this condition, the aircraft would lose lift and eventually descended rapidly. The movement of power lever to ground idle will result to the propeller pitch angle changes to low pitch angle which produces significant drag. The NTSC stated that because it happened on 112 ft, it was impossible to not crash.

Interviews from Merpati officials revealed that the first two aircraft had several problems on the Power Lever Lock System, whereas the automatic power lever lock system sometimes failed to open after landing. In May 2008, the board of instructors had agreed to revise the Normal Checklist that the Power Lock system selects to "OPEN" before landing. However, further analysis revealed that there were no faults in the engines.

Investigators then turned on the pilot who flew the plane, First Officer Vunpin. First Officer Vunpin have some experiences of delay on moving the power lever to Ground Idle during landing. On the accident flight, he turned to previous experience and lifted the mechanical power lever stop slots during approach. He realized that he retarded the Power Lever backward at about 70 ft of aircraft altitude and unintentionally entered the Beta Range. Interviews with First Officer Vunpin revealed that he had some experiences of delay on moving the power lever to Ground Idle during landing. This experience became his belief (cognitive). First Officer Vunpin has been planned to do the flight check to be qualified First Officer, and he wanted to prove that he was qualified as a First Officer. Knowing that he had repeated the errors in the past flights, he tried to prove that he had overcome his errors. However, he unintentionally moved the power lever beyond flight idle (behavioral). The aircraft lost lift and subsequently crashed.

== See also ==
- Air Caraïbes Flight 1501, a similar crash in Guadeloupe in which the pilots accidentally changed the aircraft's propeller switch into reverse pitch while still in mid-air
- Airlines PNG Flight 1600, a similar crash in Papua New Guinea involving a Dash 8 in which the pilots accidentally changed the aircraft's propeller switch into reverse pitch while still in mid-air
- Kish Air Flight 7170, a similar crash in United Arab Emirates in which the pilots accidentally changed the aircraft's propeller switch into reverse pitch while still in mid-air
- Luxair Flight 9642, a similar crash in Luxembourg in which the pilots accidentally changed the aircraft's propeller switch into reverse pitch while still in mid-air
