= Joy Air =

Airline of China (2008–2025)

Joy Air 幸福航空

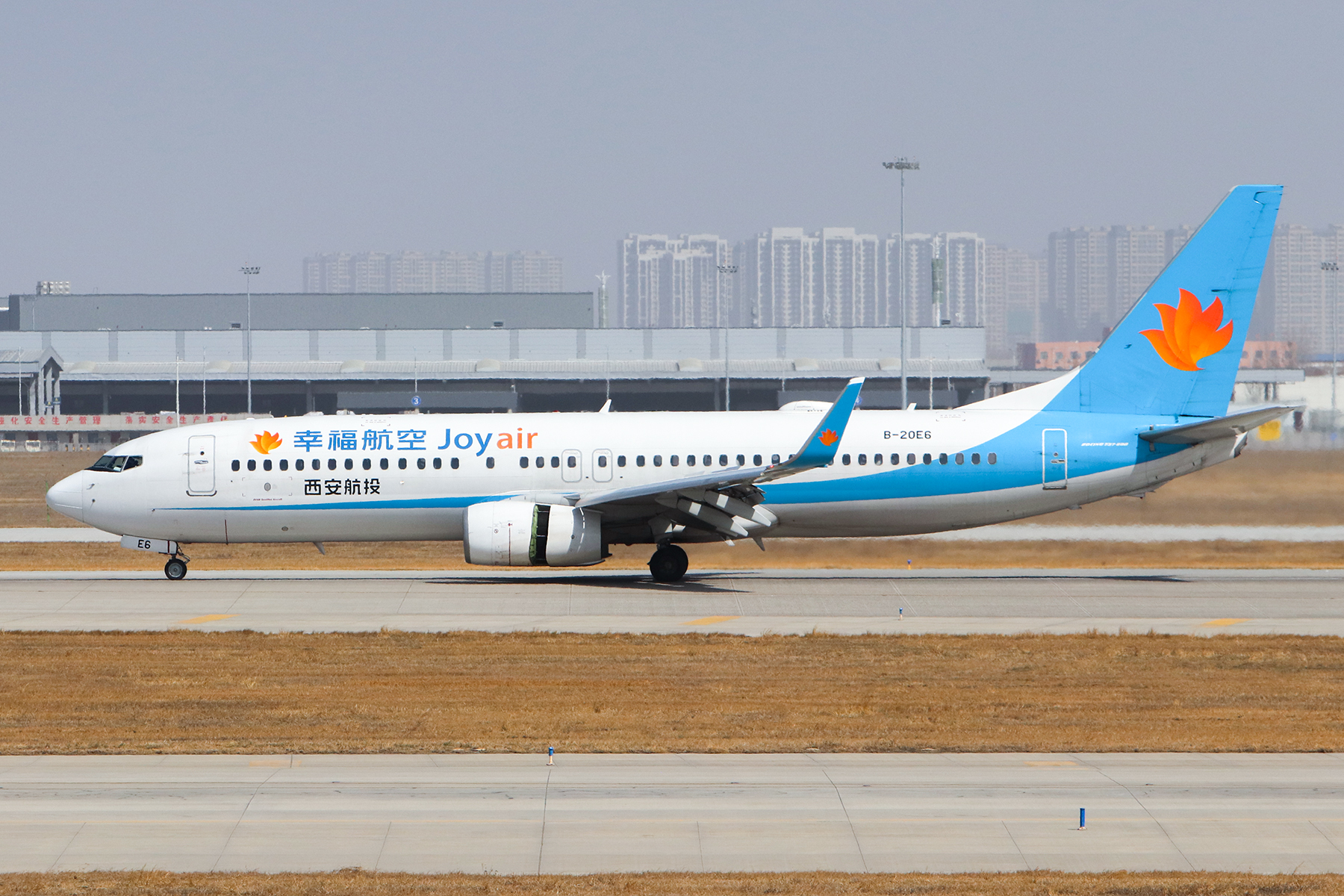
IATA	ICAO	Call sign
JR	JOY	JOY AIR
- Founded: 29 March 2008
- Commenced operations: 1 June 2009
- Ceased operations: 27 April 2025
- Hubs: Xi'an
- Focus cities: Hefei; Karamay; Taiyuan; Yinchuan
- Fleet size: 25
- Destinations: 17
- Parent company: Okay Airways
- Website: www.joy-air.com

Joy Air (Chinese: 幸福航空; pinyin: Xìngfú Hángkōng) was a Chinese airline launched jointly by China Eastern Airlines and AVIC I on 29 March 2008 based at Xi'an. The airline started testing service in June 2009, and commenced passenger service at the end of 2009. On December 14, 2020, Happy Airlines Co., Ltd.'s application to change the main operating base airport was reviewed by the Civil Aviation Administration of North China and Northwest China. The airline's original base at Tianjin Binhai International Airport was changed to Xi'an Xianyang International Airport. On 27 April 2025, the airline shutdown its operations due to operational challenges. The airline was planned to restart its operations.

The airline began flying on 1 June 2009 with a fleet of 3 MA-60 turboprops. This airline focuses on the northwestern part of China. The airline was testing its aircraft until the end of 2009 when it commenced passenger service with 4 MA-60 turboprops. The company is mainly owned by China Eastern Airlines, with the remaining owned by AVIC Group. China Eastern is planning to sell most of its shares in order to generate money for the company. Joy Air is expected to own 50 ACAC ARJ 21 and 50 MA-60 in 8 years.

Joy Air and Okay Airways were announced as launch customers for the Xian MA700 aircraft and are to be involved with the development of the aircraft, which is due to make its maiden flight in 2017.

== Fleet ==
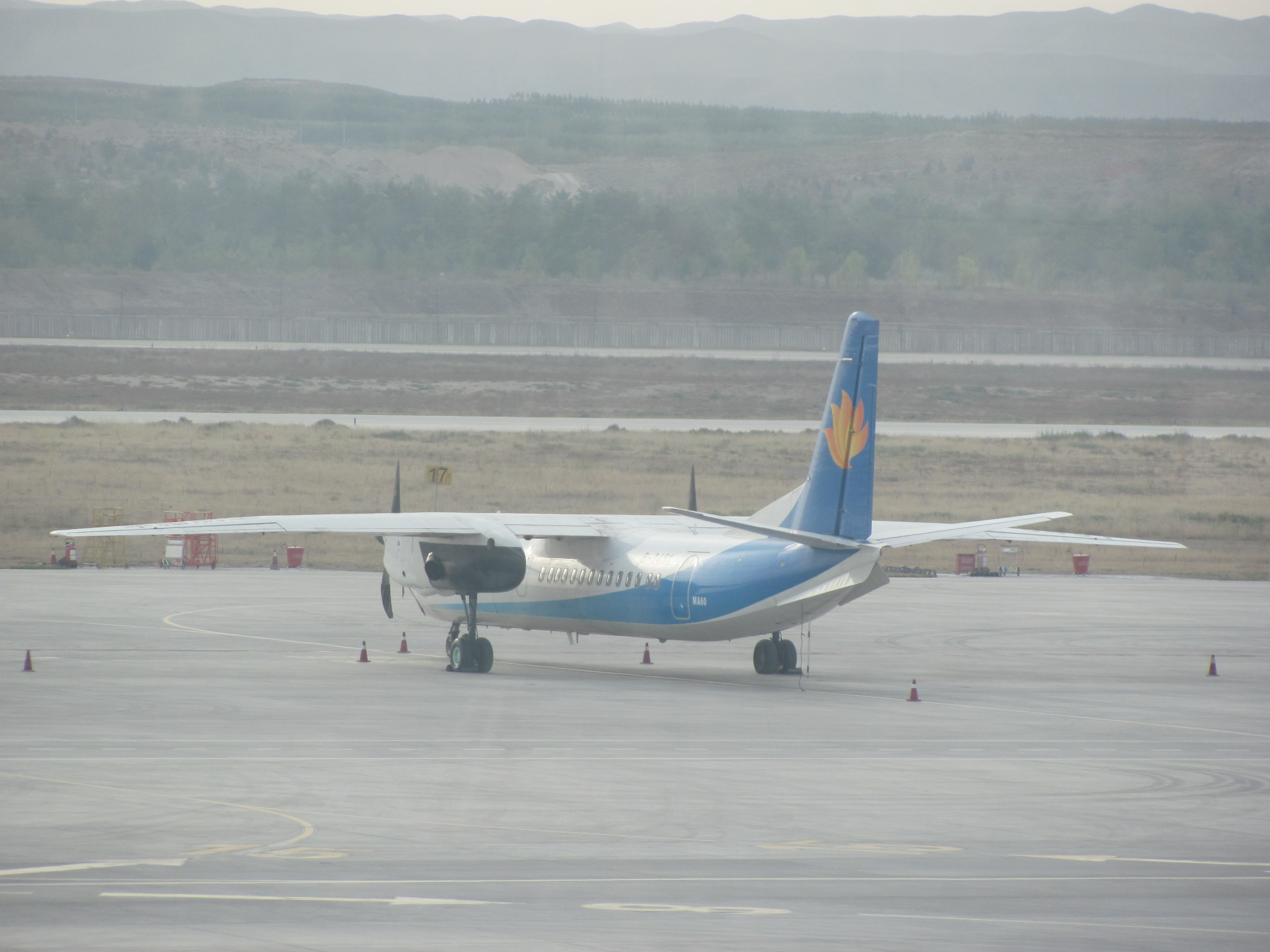
Joy Air MA-60 at Yinchuan Airport

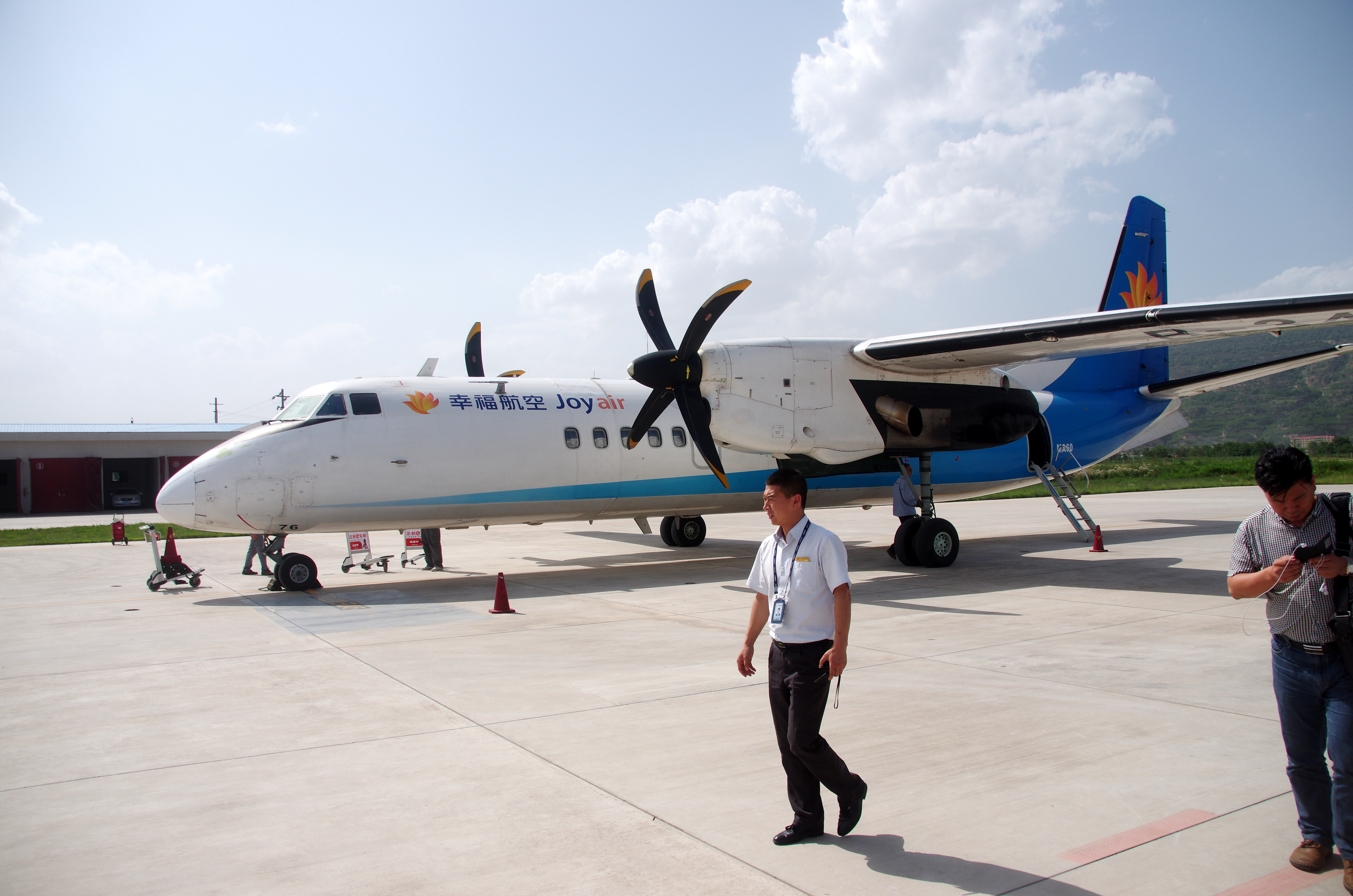
Joy Air MA-60 at Tianshui Maijishan Airport

As of August 2025, Joy Air had the following aircraft:

Joy Air fleet
Aircraft	In service	Orders	Passengers	Notes
Boeing 737-800	3	—	186	
Comac C909	—	50	85	
Comac C919	—	20	156	
Xian MA60	22	21	60	
Xi'an MA700	—	30	86	Launch customer.
Total	25	91		

== Incidents and accidents ==
On 4 February 2014 Joy Air MA60 flight JR1533 from Taiyuan, China, carrying 7 crew members and 37 passengers, had a mechanical failure on the landing gear while landing at Zhengzhou. This caused landing gear to break and the aircraft's nose cone to hit the tarmac. There were no injuries.

On 10 May 2015, Joy Air MA60 flight JR1529 from Yiwu to Fuzhou with 45 passengers and 7 crew landed on Fuzhou runway 3 at about 11:57 but veered off the runway and came to a stop off the runway edge about 500 metres past the runway threshold and about 50 metres off the runway centerline with all gear on soft ground. The engines struck the ground causing the wings to be nearly torn off, and resulted in substantial damage to the fuselage and structure. 7 occupants were injured.
