= Xi'an MA700 =

Regional airliner by Xi'an

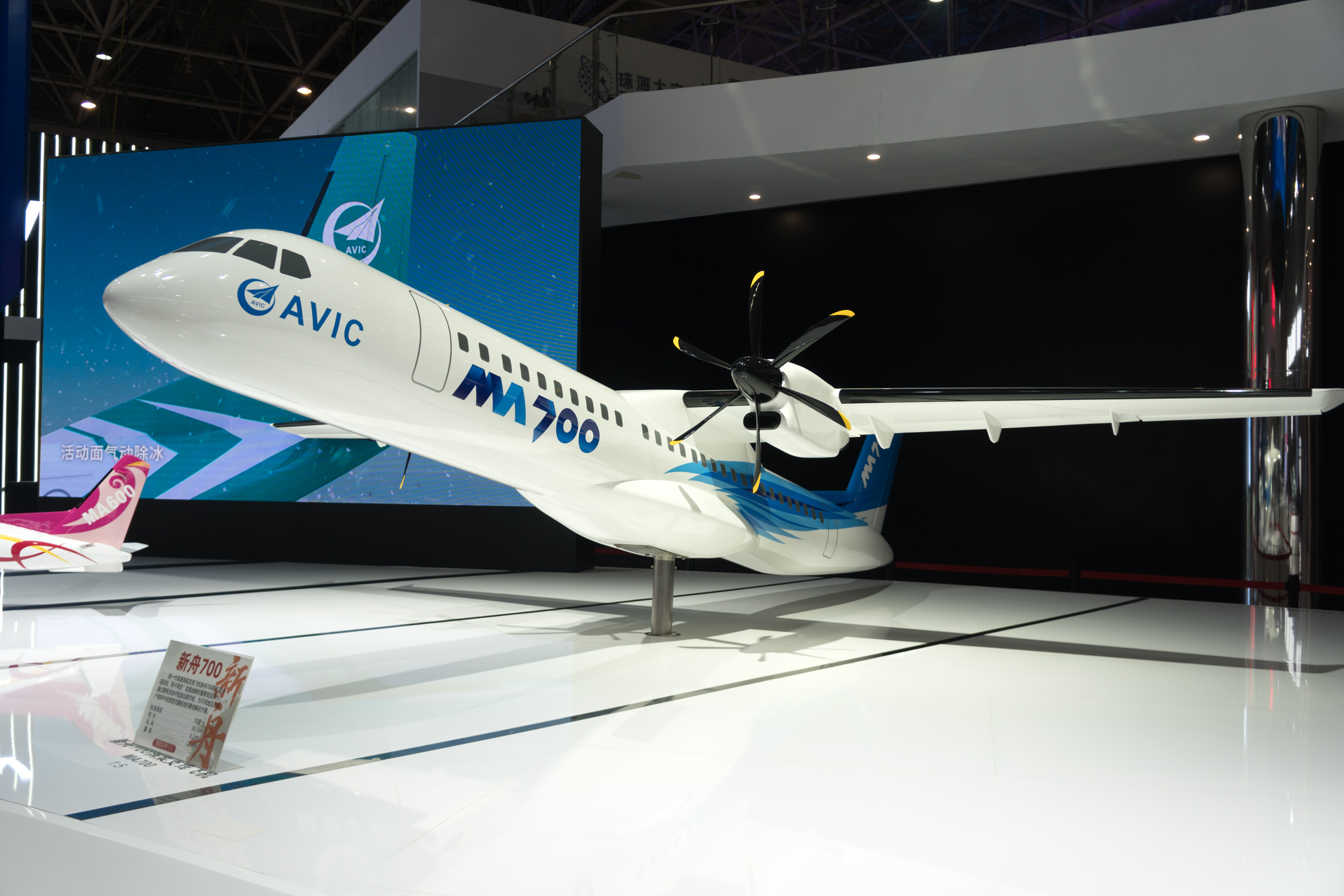
- Xi'an MA700 Mock-up at Zhuhai Aerospace Land

General information
- Type: Turboprop regional airliner
- National origin: China
- Manufacturer: Xi'an Aircraft Industrial Corporation
- Designer: Aviation Industry Corporation of China

History
- Introduction date: planned 2022 (Note: As at 2023, an article in FlightGlobal reveals that MA700 did not appear in Paris air show 2023 and then a comment appears in such article, that "fate would be unknown following Ottawa’s refusal to grant export license for PW150C engine")
- First flight: 23 or 24 September 2021
- Developed from: Xi'an MA600

The Xi'an MA700 (MA for 新舟, "Modern Ark") is a twin-engine, medium-range turboprop airliner currently under development by Xi'an Aircraft Industrial Corporation of the Aviation Industry Corporation of China (AVIC).

== Development ==
When the aircraft was first announced in 2007, it was presented as a 70-seat aircraft. However, when a model of the aircraft was shown at the 2008 Zhuhai Airshow, it was touted as capable of offering about 80 seats in 4-abreast configuration. Preliminary design was reviewed in January 2017, before detailed design.

Okay Airways and Joy Air were announced as launch customers for the aircraft and to be involved with its development, which had been due to make its maiden flight in November 2019. By late 2017 there were 185 orders for the 86-seat aircraft with purchase agreements with 11 customers including Joy Air, Okay Airways and Cambodia Bayon Airlines. The first prototype had been due to be assembled in 2017, with a maiden flight in 2019 and certification scheduled for 2021. AVIC plans to apply for airworthiness certification with the United States' Federal Aviation Administration and the European Aviation Safety Agency so the plane can enter the Western market.

Long-lead items like flap and cargo door structures started to be built from December 2017. In December 2017, Dowty Propellers was selected for a R408 propeller derivative. Manufacturing of its flaps and cargo door had begun in Xi'an and Shenyang, respectively. In January 2018, AVIC said structural and strength tests allowed to release wing flaps and forward fuselage technical specifications. Maiden flight is targeted for November 2019, and Chinese certification by 2021 before introduction. The first was to be rolled out around the middle of 2019 and first delivered in 2022. While detailed design was to be completed by April 2018, the program slipped three years since its launch at the end of 2013, and Avic has not yet built a reputation for dependable products.

Design of major assemblies like the fuselage sections and wingboxes was sent to factories in late May 2018, to be constructed by the end of the year. Structural design was finalized by June 2018 while 25-26 systems critical design reviews were completed. Others should be completed by August and systems should be delivered from October for integrated system testing. Technical manuals will be written in the second half of 2018.

The first MA700 was to be rolled out in June 2019 before a few months of ground tests including taxi runs. The PW150C should get certification by 2019 end. Avic expects the EASA and FAA to validate the CAAC certification, anticipated for 2021 after 24 months of flight testing. Avic sibling Comac needed six years for the ARJ21 and the C919 may need at least four years.

In July, Avic selected Rockwell Collins, Thales, Meggitt and Parker Hannifin as suppliers at the Farnborough Airshow. By then, the CAAC had completed its review of the structure digital model, as the first prototype's fin, doors, undercarriage and nacelles were to begin construction. The engine, avionics, propellers, APU and electrical system should be reviewed before the end of 2018. Major assemblies should be sent for final assembly at Xi'an in the first half of 2019. Avic develops the MA700 mostly from its own resources. By December, the first centre wing box was completed for the static test aircraft towards a mid-2019 roll-out and 2022 service entry.

By June 2019, large fuselage parts were finished while the wings debuted assembly, before main components delivery and final assembly by the end of the year and static testing. By July, the forward fuselage was completed after the main and nose fuselage sections. By then, the first roll-out slipped by three months to September. The nose, forward, and main fuselage sections were joined by 18 July. The fuselage was mated with the wings by the end of September.

Discussions on using domestic Chinese engines for MA700 manifest after Canadian government's refusal to issue export licence for the Pratt & Whitney Canada PW150C powerplant according to an article published in aviation media Flightglobal. The Canadian engine manufacturer has confirmed that the export licence, for which it had applied in 2018, was denied in 2020 which reflects the poor overall relationship between Beijing and Ottawa at that time. Apart from the engine supply issue, comment also exists that additional challenges would be anticipated given the MA700's extensive reliance on western suppliers and these challenges largely stem from the USA's inclusion of AVIC Xian Aircraft in the Military End User (MEU) list that was published in December 2020. Despite this, an aviation news media reported that P&WC shipped four engines to AVIC.

It is reported that the MA700 has completed its first flight on 23 or 24 September 2021. Despite this, the lack of prospects for a regular supply of engine would put the MA700 project on hold, yet Chinese developed engines AEP500 series have been unveiled as early as 2018, and a small-scale trial production has been completed around 2021, although the target of airworthiness certification of the AEP500 powerplant is planned at year 2028.

At the 2023 Paris air show, the MA700 turboprop was missing in the AVIC stand of the show, at which preceding model MA60 turboprop was there instead, thus one commented that "whose (in-development MA700's) fate would be unknown" following Ottawa's refusal to grant export license for PW150C engine so the absence of the model (MA700, in year 2023 show) raises questions about the programme of developing MA700.

In 2025, Aviation Week reported that the MA700 had "broken cover" in taxi-test footage showing the plane now using a domestically-produced powerplant, replacing the former PW150C engine design.

== Design ==
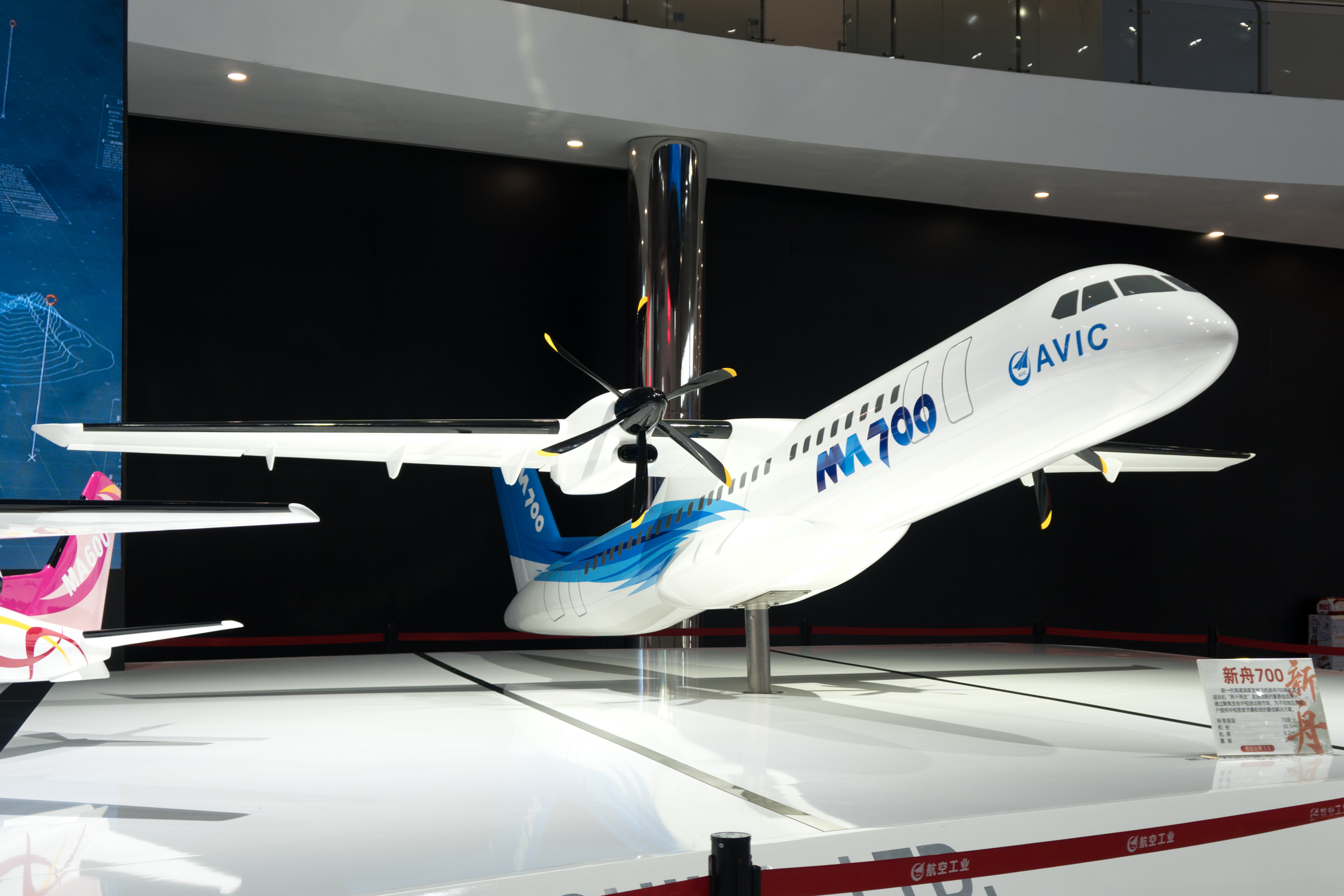
MA700 mockup exhibited at Zhuhai Aerospace Land

The MA700 is conventional configuration, with a straight, tapered wing mounted high on the mid-fuselage, two tractor engines and a T-tail. The tricycle main landing gear are carried on faired pods outside the pressure vessel. The 2008 model was equipped with 6-bladed slightly swept propellers and showed 28 passenger windows per side.

Powered by Pratt & Whitney Canada PW150C turboprops, the fly-by-wire aircraft will seat up to 86 passengers, will have a maximum take-off weight of 26.5 t (58,000 lb) and a range of up to 2,700 km (1,500 nmi). The MA700 is an all-new design, larger than its competitors with 78 seats at 79 cm (31 in) pitch compared to 74 in the Q400 and 68 in the ATR 72, and stretch potential for 90. At launch, the program targeted an empty weight of 14.5 t (32,000 lb), but since gross weight came 1 t (2,200 lb) heavier: range was reduced by 100 km (54 nmi) for 1,500 km (810 nmi) with a full payload, saving several hundred kilograms, and shortening the aircraft by 0.4 m (1.3 ft) also saved weight.

Its 550–580 km/h (300–310 kn) cruise speed is faster than the originally expected 500 km/h (270 kn) and the power installed to achieve fast climbs should let it attain its 637 km/h (344 kn) maximum speed. When it make its first flight, a 50-seat version similar to an ATR 42 should be developed for better high-elevation performance. It would operate from 1,800 m (5,900 ft.) runways in high temperatures or snow, serving 95% of Chinese airports, excluding the highest in Tibet.

== Orders and deliveries ==
As of June 2019, AVIC states 11 operators have ordered 285 aircraft.

Customer	Orders
(China) Joy Air	30
(China) Okay Airways	30
(China) CDB Leasing	30
(China) CMB Leasing	30
(China) Chongqing General Aviation Financing and Leasing	10
(China) Poly Technologies	5
(Nepal) Air Avenues	10
(United Arab Emirates) Emirates EGA Group	10
(Pakistan) Hybrid Aviation	10
(South Africa) Segers Aero	10
Total	185

== Specifications (MA700) ==
Data from AVIC

General characteristics

- Crew: two pilots
- Capacity: 68-86 seats / 11.88 m^{3} Cargo
- Length: 30.5 m (100 ft 1 in)
- Wingspan: 27.9 m (91 ft 6 in)
- Height: 8.2 m (26 ft 11 in)
- Empty weight: 15,800 kg (34,833 lb)
- Max takeoff weight: 27,600 kg (60,848 lb)
- Maximum payload: 8,600 kg (18,960 lb)
- Powerplant: 2 × Pratt & Whitney Canada PW150C turboprop
- Propellers: 6-bladed Dowty Propellers R504

Performance

- Maximum speed: 637 km/h (396 mph, 344 kn) Maximum cruise (MTOW, ISA, 6000 m)
- Cruise speed: 550–580 km/h (340–360 mph, 300–310 kn) Economical cruise
- Range: 1,500 km (930 mi, 810 nmi) Standard payload
- Ferry range: 2,700 km (1,700 mi, 1,500 nmi)
- Service ceiling: 7,620 m (25,000 ft)
- Fuel consumption: 1.69 kg/km (6.0 lb/mi)
- 600 km (320 nmi) sector fuel consumption
- Single engine ceiling: 5,690 m (18,670 ft) (95% MTOW，ISA+10°C)
- Takeoff: 1,400 m (4,600 ft) (MTOW, SL, ISA)
- Landing: 1,200 m (3,900 ft) (MLW, SL, ISA)

== See also ==
- ATR 72
- Bombardier Q-Series
- Ilyushin Il-114
