= Xi'an MA60 =

Regional airliner by Xi'an

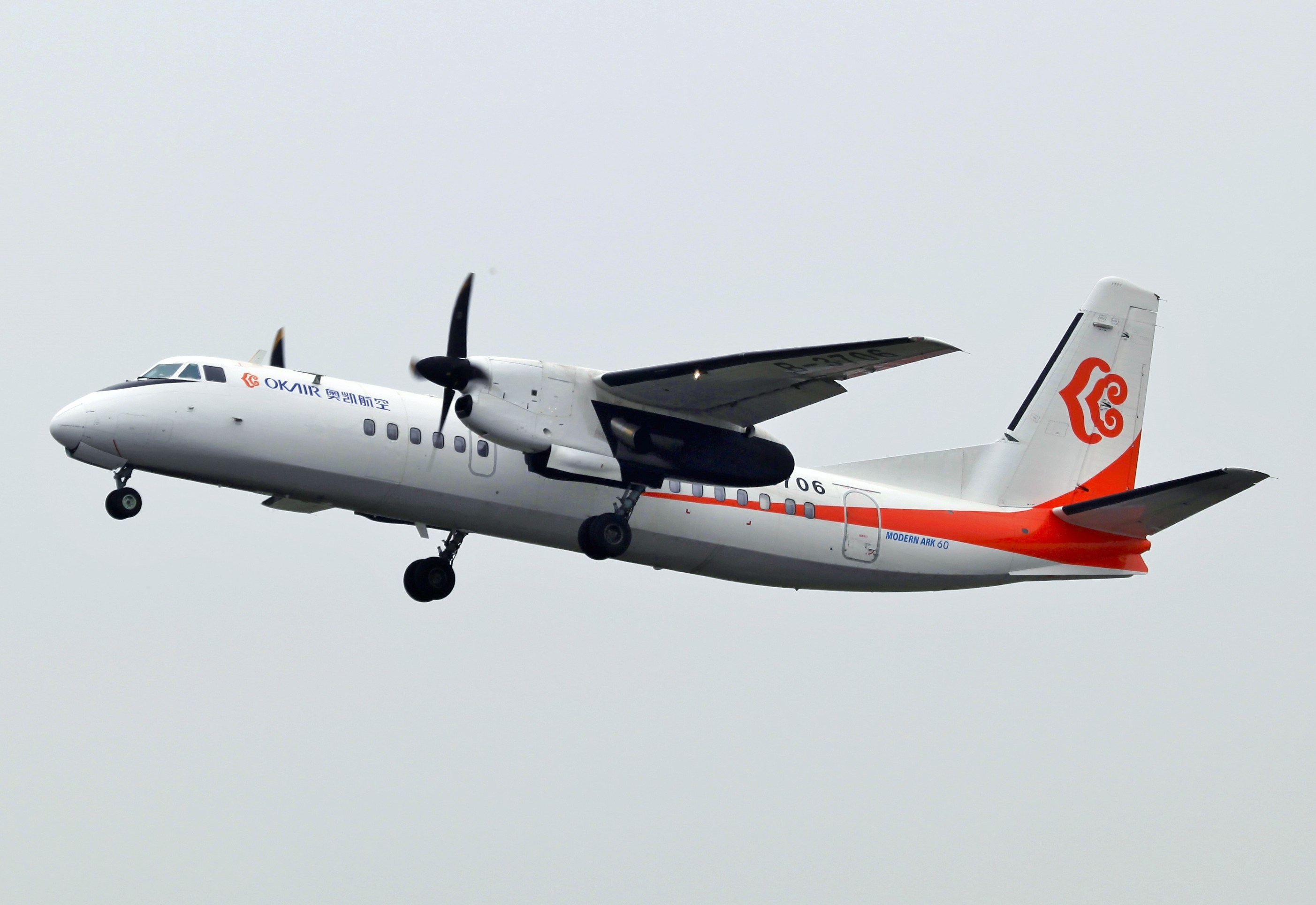
- An Okay Airways Xi'an MA60

General information
- Type: Turboprop regional airliner
- National origin: China
- Manufacturer: Xi'an Aircraft Industrial Corporation
- Status: In service, in production
- Primary users: People's Liberation Army Air Force People's Liberation Army Navy Air Force; China Meteorological Administration; Lao Skyway
- Number built: 110 (March 2013)

History
- Manufactured: 2000–present
- Introduction date: August 2000 with Sichuan Airlines
- First flight: 25 February 2000
- Developed from: Xi'an Y-7
- Developed into: Xi'an MA600

The Xi'an MA60 (新舟60, Xīnzhōu liùshí, "Modern Ark 60") is a turboprop-powered airliner produced by China's Xi'an Aircraft Industrial Corporation under the Aviation Industry Corporation of China (AVIC). The MA60 is a stretched version of the Xi'an Y7-200A, which was produced based on the An-24 to operate in rugged conditions with limited ground support and has short take-off and landing (STOL) capability.

The airplane received its type certificate from the Civil Aviation Administration of China in June 2000. The MA60 has not applied for FAA (US) and EASA (Europe) type certification, and is not certified for use in the European Union or the US. The general designer of MA-60 series is Lü Hai (吕海).

== Variants ==
- Xi'an MA60-100: Reduced weight improved performance.
- Xi'an MA60-MPA Fearless Albatross: Maritime patrol and ASW variant offered for sale at Airshow China 2002.
- Xi'an MA40: Reduced capacity 40-seat variant offered for sale in 2002.
- Xi'an MA60H-500: A military cargo version of the MA-60, with rear cargo ramp.
- Xi'an MA600: A much improved MA60, the prototype of which was completed on 29 June 2008.

== Characteristics ==
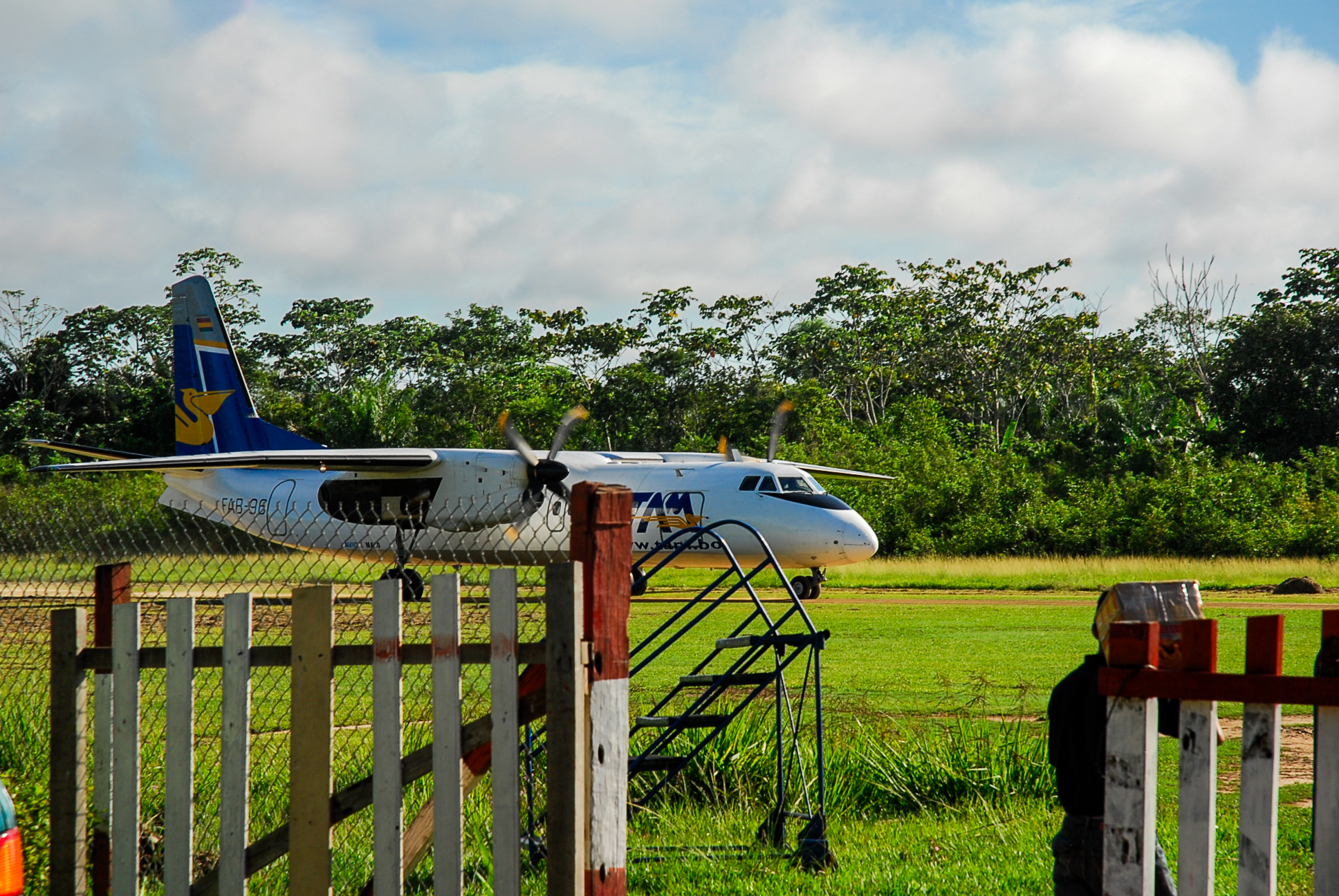
An TAM MA60, operating on a grass runway at Rurrenabaque Airport in Bolivia.

The Xi’an MA60 is a twin-engine turboprop aircraft designed for short regional flights, including passenger and cargo transport, maritime patrol, medical evacuation, and paratrooper operations. It features a high-wing configuration that supports stable low-speed performance and ground clearance.

The aircraft is capable of taking off and landing on unprepared surfaces, including grass and compacted earth runways. The flight deck accommodates a pilot and co-pilot, while the cabin measures 10.8 m in length, 2.7 m in width, and 1.9 m in height, providing seating for up to 60 passengers in a four-seat arrangement. The MA60 is powered by two Pratt & Whitney Canada PW127J turboprop engines rated at 2,051 kW of output power each.

== Operators ==
As of October 2006, XAC has received over 90 MA60 orders. The factory had delivered 23 MA60s by the end of 2006, and expects to deliver an additional 165 by the end of 2016. The aircraft is popular with air charter companies and small feeder airlines, and is operated by private individuals and companies.

=== Civil ===
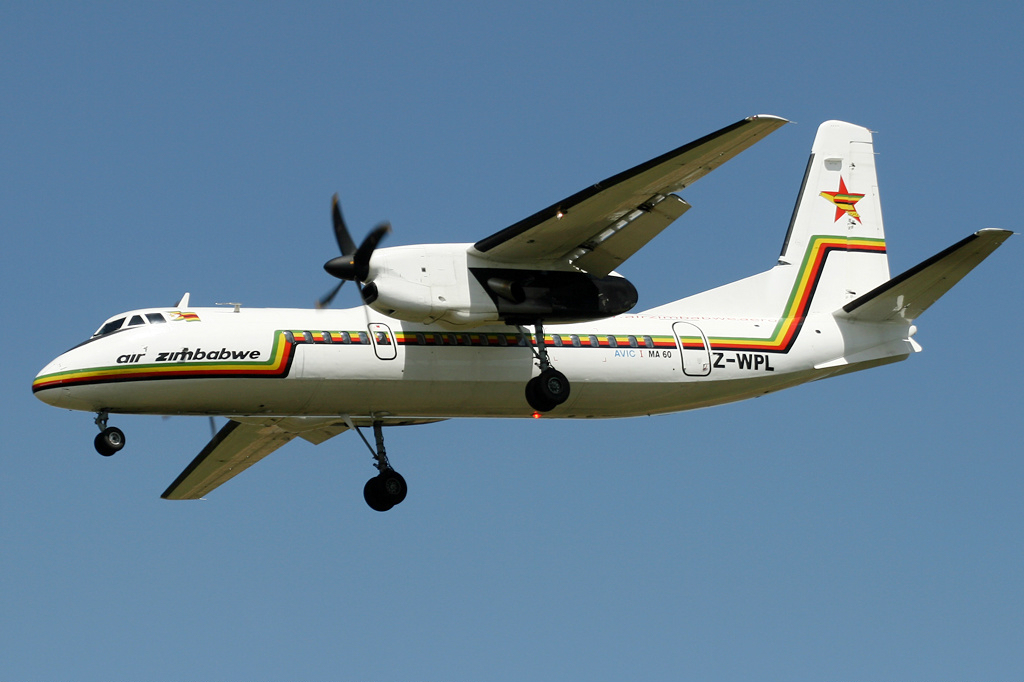
An MA60 flying with Air Zimbabwe

Laos

- Lao Skyway

Zimbabwe

- Air Zimbabwe (stored)

Tajikistan

- Tajik Air

=== Government ===
Angola

- National Air Force of Angola

Cambodia

- Royal Cambodian Air Force

Cameroon

- Cameroon Air Force

China

- Civil Aviation Flight University of China
- China Meteorological Administration

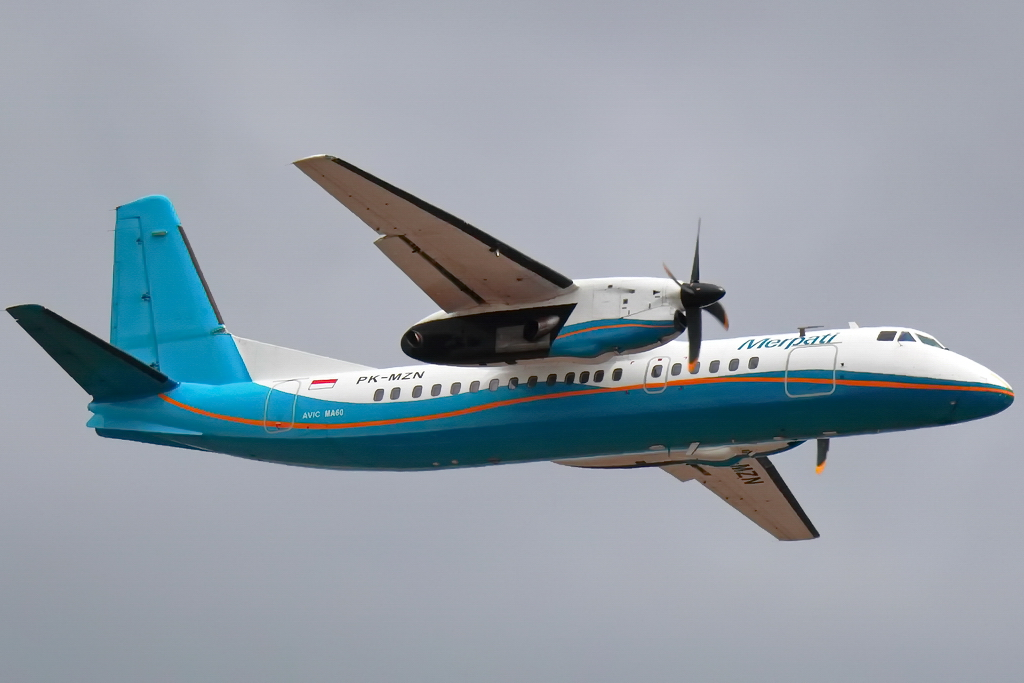
An MA60 from Merpati Nusantara Airlines

- People's Liberation Army Air Force

Djibouti

- Djibouti Air Force

Laos

- Laotian Army Air Force

Sri Lanka

- Sri Lanka Air Force

Zambia

- Zambian Air Force

== Accidents and incidents ==
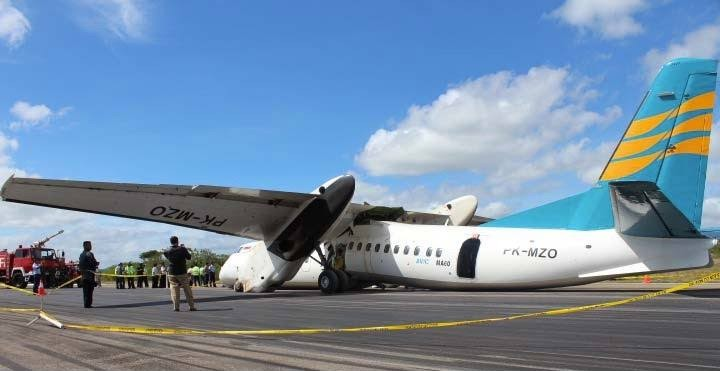
The Xi'an MA60 following the Merpati Nusantara Airlines Flight 6517 accident

As of 13 November 2015, there had been 14 accidents involving the MA60.

- On 11 January 2009, an MA60 operated by Philippine carrier Zest Airways crashed at Caticlan Airport when it landed short of the runway, skidded out of control and crashed into a concrete barrier. The aircraft caught fire and suffered extensive damage to its wing, landing gear, undercarriage and one engine. Several passengers were injured.
- In June 2009, an MA60 operated by Zest overshot the runway while trying to land at Caticlan airport. As a consequence of this accident lengthening of the runway and the flattening of a hill that obstructs one of its approaches was carried out.
- On 7 May 2011, Merpati Nusantara Airlines Flight 8968 (with Indonesian registration PK-MZK) went into the sea only 500 metres from the runway in bad weather with poor visibility on a visual approach to Kaimana Airport, Kaimana, West Papua in Indonesia. It had left Sorong Airport with 19 passengers and 6 crew members on board., according to manifest 21 passenger and 4 crew, All passengers and crew were killed, making this the first reported fatal accident for the Xi'an MA60. On 24 August 2011, Indonesia's Transportation Minister determined human error was to blame for the disaster.
- On 9 January 2012, a TAM flight from Riberalta Airport to Guayaramerín Airport, Bolivia operated by FAB-96 landed with the undercarriage not deployed due to a fault, resulting in substantial damage to the aircraft. There were no injuries amongst the five crew and sixteen passengers.
- On 16 May 2013, a Myanma Airways flight from Heho Airport to Monghsat Airport in Myanmar overran the runway on landing, resulting in two serious injuries and substantial damage to the aircraft. The MA60 allegedly suffered a brake failure.
- On 10 June 2013, Merpati Nusantara Airlines Flight 6517 (with Indonesian registration PK-MZO) from Bajawa to Kupang, with 50 people on board landed hard at Kupang airport in East Nusa Tenggara, Indonesia. Twenty-five people were injured. The plane, which was damaged beyond repair, lay on its belly on the runway with its engines jammed face down into the tarmac and its wings bent forward. Indonesian National Transportation Safety Committee (NTSC) has released a preliminary report on this accident. The preliminary report consisted of factual information collected until the preliminary report was published without analysis and conclusion.
- On 10 June 2013, Myanma Airways flight UB309 from Mawlamyine, Myanmar, carrying four crew members and 60 passengers swerved off the runway upon landing at Kawthaung. The plane came to a stop in bushes about 60 metres to the west of the runway, with smoke coming from the left side propeller housing and the propellers on both wings damaged. There were no injuries. It is possible the captain was too early in switching the nosewheel steering to the 'taxi' mode during the landing roll and lost directional control. A similar incident occurred in December 2011.
- On 4 February 2014, Joy Air flight JR1533 from Taiyuan, China, carrying 7 crew members and 37 passengers, had a mechanical failure of the landing gear while landing at Zhengzhou. This caused the landing gear to break and the aircraft's nose cone to hit the tarmac. There were no injuries.
- On 10 May 2015, Joy Air flight JR1529 from Yiwu to Fuzhou with 45 passengers and 7 crew landed on Fuzhou runway 3 at about 11:57 but veered off the runway and came to a stop off the runway edge about 500 metres past the runway threshold and about 50 metres off the runway centerline with all gear on soft ground. The engines struck the ground causing the wings to be nearly torn off, and resulted in substantial damage to the fuselage and structure. 7 people on board were injured.
- On 13 November 2015, Lao Skyway flight LLL 265 overshot the runway at Vientiane.

== Operational problems ==
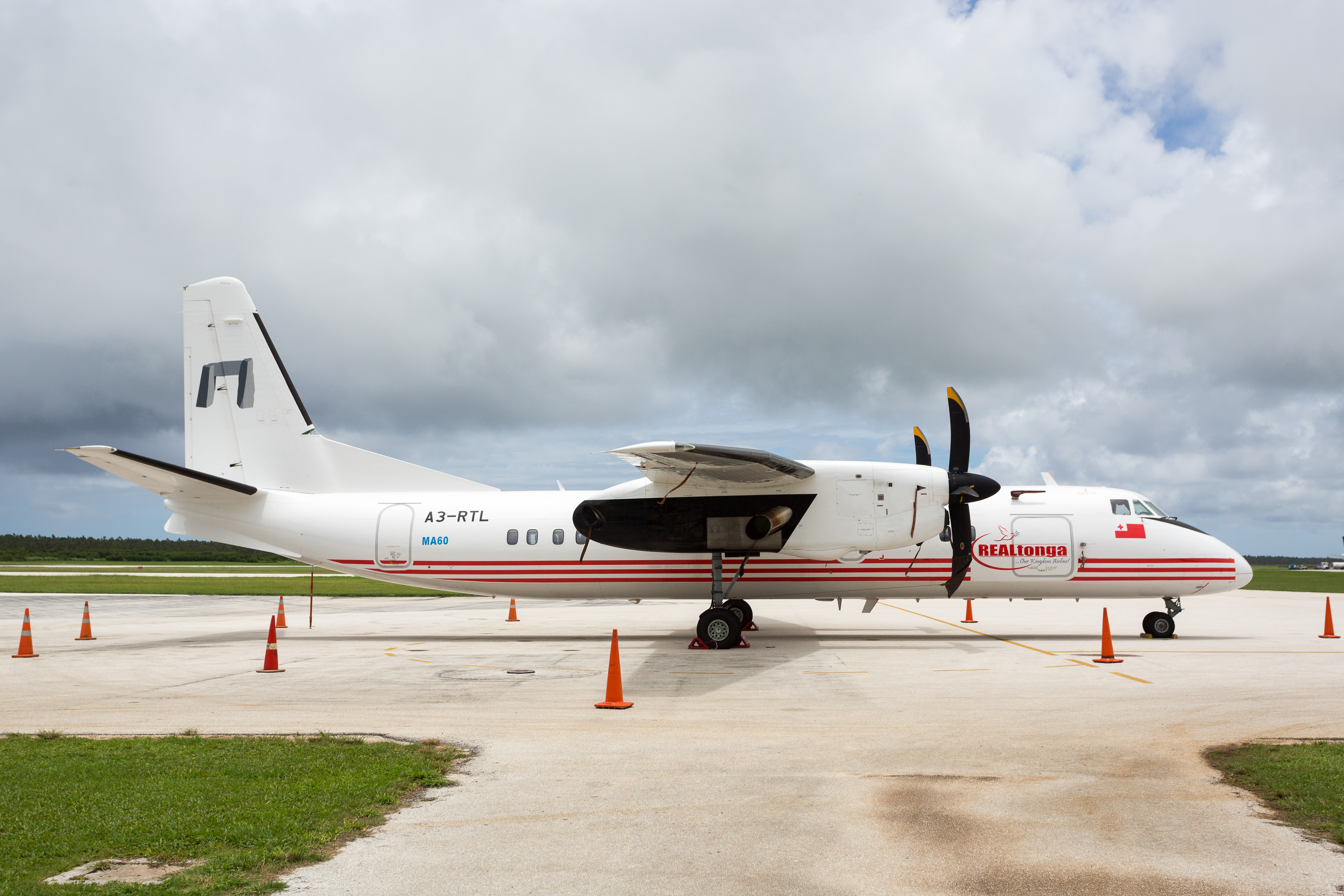
Real Tonga's MA60 in 2014

The New Zealand Government suspended its programme of development aid to Tonga's tourism industry in July 2013 after an MA60 donated by the Chinese Government was delivered to the airline Real Tonga. In August 2013 the New Zealand Government also issued a statement advising tourists to not travel on Real Tonga's MA60 on the grounds that "this aircraft has been involved in a significant number of accidents in the last few years", and the type "is not certified to fly in New Zealand or other comparable jurisdictions". Real Tonga ceased operating the MA60 in early 2015 after the Tongan Government passed legislation adopting New Zealand's civil aviation regulations. A proposal to re-establish Royal Tongan Airlines to operate the MA60 was reported later in the year.

Of the 57 MA60s exported by January 2016, at least 26 were in storage after safety concerns, maintenance problems or performance issues; six others were damaged beyond repair.

On 26 March 2019 the Cameroon Civil Aviation Authority (CCAA) suspended the airworthiness certificate of the MA60 following a tail strike accident. The aircraft was allowed to operate again one day later.

In August 2020, Nepal Airlines grounded its fleet of 2 MA60s due to their sub-standard performance and high operating costs. The aircraft had been acquired in 2012 and as per a Nepal Airlines board member, "The 2012 decision to buy the aircraft was prompted by greed for commissions. The Nepali experts submitted a fabricated report. The Y12E was compared with the Twin Otter, and the MA60 was compared with the ATR 72. Nepal Airlines is paying the price now".

== Specifications (MA60) ==
Data from Jane's All The World's Aircraft 2003–2004

General characteristics

- Crew: 2
- Capacity: 62 passengers
- Length: 24.71 m (81 ft 1 in)
- Wingspan: 29.2 m (95 ft 10 in)
- Height: 8.86 m (29 ft 1 in)
- Wing area: 75 m^{2} (810 sq ft)
- Airfoil: root: TsAGI S-5-18; tip: TsAGI S-3-13
- Empty weight: 13,700 kg (30,203 lb)
- Max takeoff weight: 21,800 kg (48,061 lb)
- Powerplant: 2 × Pratt & Whitney Canada PW127J turbo prop engines, 2,051 kW (2,750 hp) each
- Propellers: 4-bladed Hamilton Sundstrand 247F-3 constant-speed propellers

Performance

- Maximum speed: 514 km/h (319 mph, 278 kn)
- Cruise speed: 430 km/h (270 mph, 230 kn)
- Range: 1,600 km (990 mi, 860 nmi)
- Service ceiling: 7,620 m (25,000 ft)

== See also ==
Related development

- Xi'an Y-7
- Antonov An-24
- Xi'an MA600

Aircraft of comparable role, configuration, and era

- Antonov An-140
- ATR 72
- Bombardier Dash 8
- CN-235
- Fokker 50
- Ilyushin Il-114
- Saab 2000

Related lists

- List of airliners
