= Xi'an MA600 =

Regional airliner by Xi'an

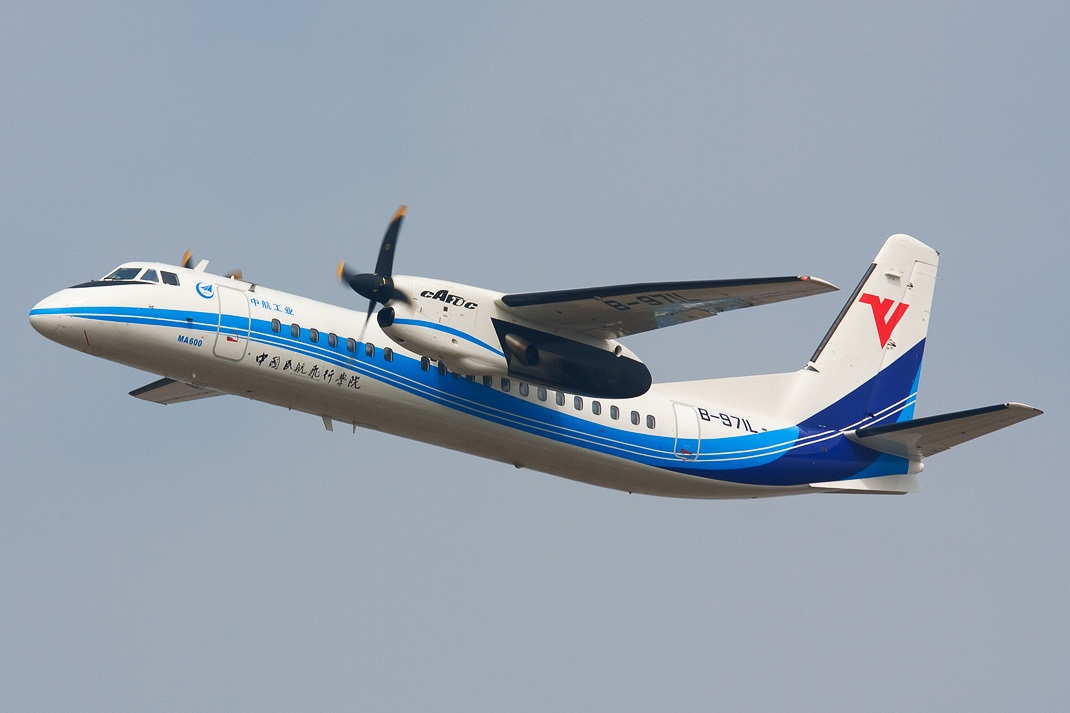
- Xi'an MA600

General information
- Type: Turboprop Regional airliner
- National origin: China
- Manufacturer: Xi'an Aircraft Industrial Corporation
- Designer: Avic
- Status: In service
- Primary users: Civil Aviation Administration of China Laos Government; Malawi Air Force; Lao Skyway
- Number built: 18

History
- Introduction date: 2010
- First flight: 10 October 2008
- Developed from: Xi'an MA60
- Developed into: Xi'an MA700

The Xi'an MA600 (MA for "Modern Ark", 新舟) is an improved version of the Xi'an MA60 manufactured by the Xi'an Aircraft Industrial Corporation under the Aviation Industry Corporation of China (AVIC).

== Development ==
Xi'an Aircraft Industry Corporation rolled out its first MA600 turboprop on 29 June 2008. MA600 made its maiden flight on 10 October 2008. The aircraft is equipped with new avionics, improved passenger cabin and engines with increased thrust when compared to MA60.

Powered by Pratt & Whitney Canada PW127J turboprop engines, it has a 60-passenger capacity.

As of October 2018, over 300 have been ordered.

Xi'an Aircraft Industry Co., manufacturer of the MA600, noted that the successful test flight is "an important milestone" in Chinese domestic aircraft production. MD Meng Xiangkai revealed that the aircraft is expected to obtain its airworthiness certificate and enter service in the second half of 2009, with the first delivery to the Civil Aviation Flight University of China in Sichuan Province. Batch delivery will start in 2010.

The aircraft will be equipped with the Becker-Communications "DVCS6100 Digital Intercom System, Cabin Intercommunication and Passenger Address". The cockpit is equipped with the Rockwell Collins Pro Line 21 avionics suite.

Various operators in Asia and Africa have ordered 310 (March 2018).

== Variants ==
=== MA600 ===
Passenger airliner variant

=== MA600F ===
Freighter variant with cargo door on starboard side. Cargo hold can accommodate five LD3’s or five 88″x54″ pallets.

=== MA700 ===
The MA700 is the development of MA600, which is a stretched version of MA60 with up to 86 seats. the Maiden flight is scheduled for November 2019, and expected deliveries to buyers are scheduled to begin in 2021. The MA700 will adopt advanced technologies such as fly-by-wire control and modular avionics and will replace its predecessors including the MA60 and its variants. MA700 is designed to have an increase of fuel efficiency of 20% and the reduction of operating cost of 10% in comparison to MA600, despite being larger than MA600.

== Operators ==
=== Government operators ===
- Civil Aviation Flight University of China – 1 delivered and 1 on order

=== Civil operators ===
- Lao Skyway (Launch Customer)
- China Air Cargo Co. Ltd - MA600F

=== Military operators ===
- Lao People's Liberation Army Air Force - 2
- Malawi Air Force - received 2 planes in service as of March 2023.

== Specifications (MA600) ==
Data from Modern Ark

General characteristics

- Crew: 2 flight crew
- Capacity: 60 passengers
- Length: 24.71 m (81 ft 1 in)
- Wingspan: 29.2 m (95 ft 10 in)
- Height: 8.858 m (29 ft 1 in)
- Empty weight: 13,730 kg (30,269 lb)
- Max takeoff weight: 21,800 kg (48,061 lb)
- Powerplant: 2 × Pratt & Whitney Canada PW127J turboprop engines, 2,148 kW (2,881 hp) each

Performance

- Maximum speed: 514 km/h (319 mph, 278 kn) TAS
- Cruise speed: 430 km/h (270 mph, 230 kn)
- Range: 1,430 km (890 mi, 770 nmi) with 56 passengers and 198 lb (90kg) per passenger with reserve: 185 km + 45min., ISA
- Service ceiling: 7,622 m (25,007 ft)
- Taking off altitude limitation 3,680 m (12,073 ft) AMSL

== See also ==
Related development

- Antonov An-24/Xi'an Y-7
- Xi'an MA60
- Xi'an MA700

Aircraft of comparable role, configuration, and era

- Antonov An-140
- ATR 72
- Bombardier Dash 8
- CASA/IPTN CN-235
- Ilyushin Il-114
- Saab 2000

Related lists

- List of civil aircraft
