= Xi'an Aircraft Industrial Corporation =

Chinese aerospace manufacturer

Coordinates: 34.643077°N 109.236267°E

- Native name: 西安飞机工业（集团）有限责任公司
- Type: Subsidiary
- Industry: Aerospace
- Founded: 1958; 68 years ago (Xi'an)
- Headquarters: Xi'an, Shaanxi, China
- Area served: Worldwide
- Products: Aircraft
- Number of employees: Approx. 20,000
- Parent: AVIC Xi'an Aircraft Industry Group
- Website: www.xac.com.cn

Xi'an Aircraft Industrial Corporation
- Simplified Chinese: 西安飞机工业（集团）有限责任公司
- Traditional Chinese: 西安飛機工業（集團）有限責任公司
- Literal meaning: Xi'an Aircraft Industry (Group) Company Limited
Transcriptions
Standard Mandarin
- Hanyu Pinyin: Xī'ān Fēijī Gōngyè (Jítuán) Yǒuxiàn Zérèn Gōngsī

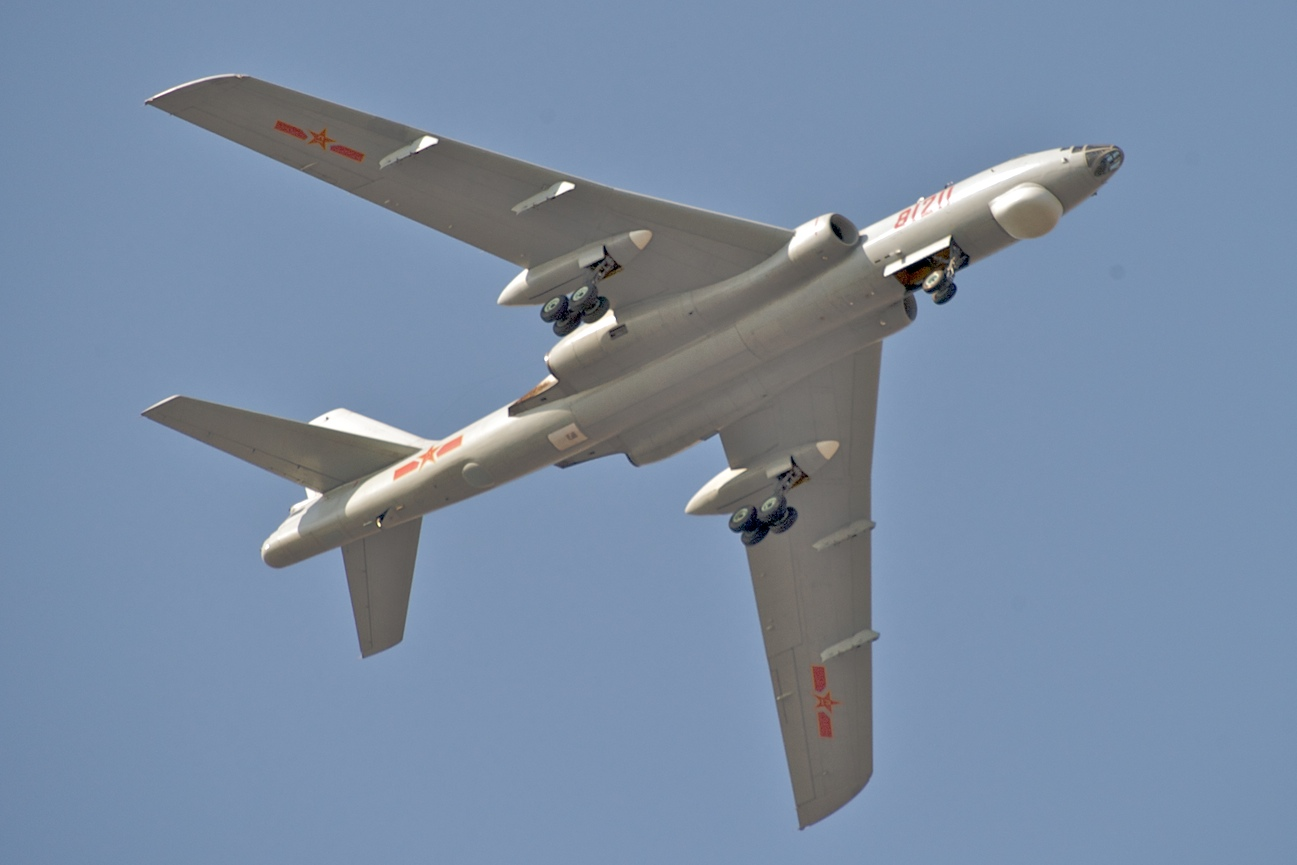
Xi'an H-6

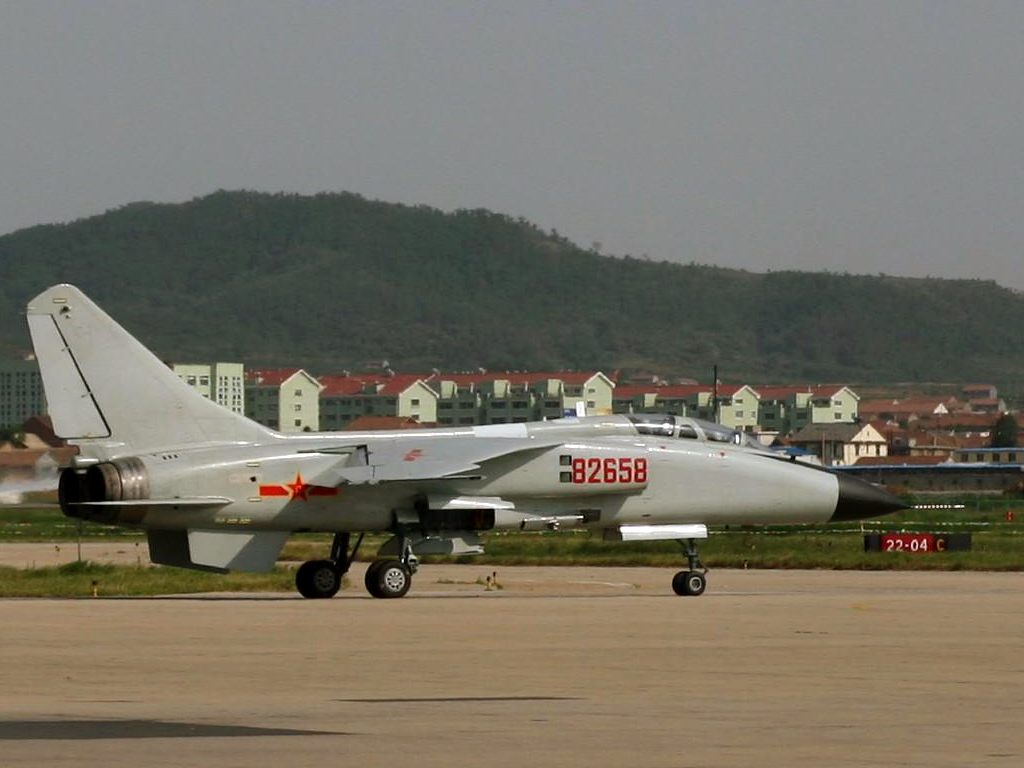
Xi'an JH-7 Flying Leopard

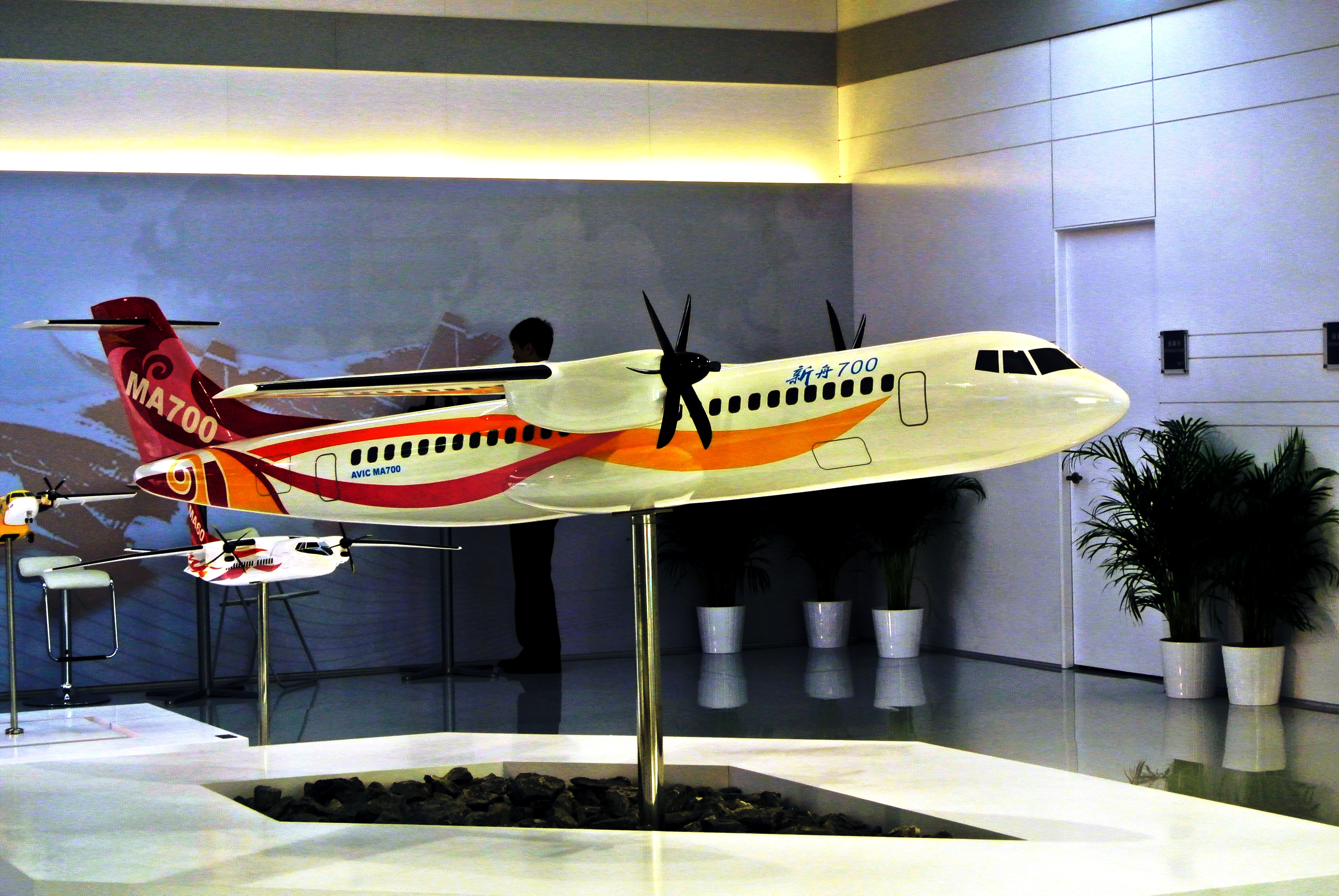
Model of Xi'an MA700 at the 2013 Paris Airshow

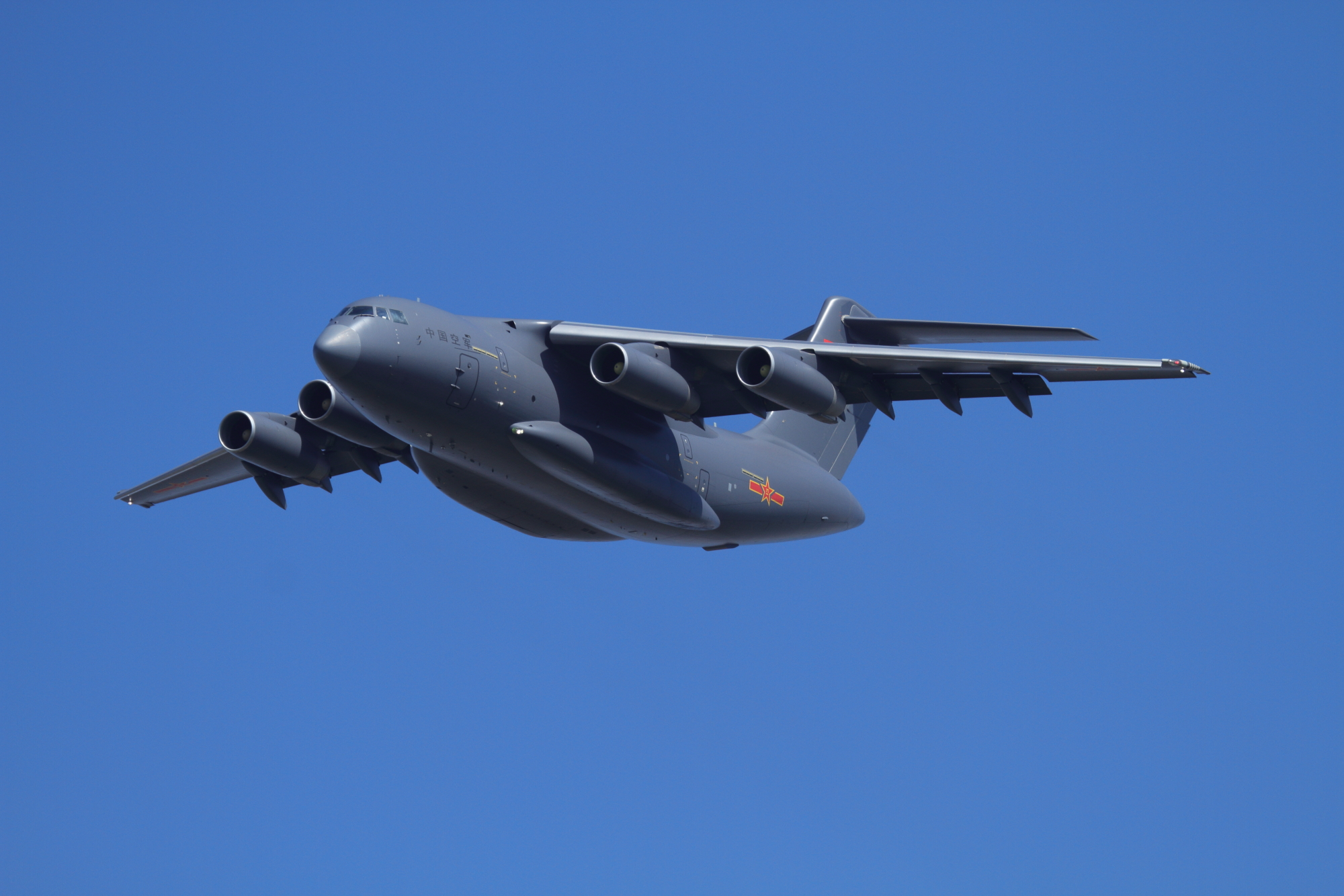
Xi'an Y-20

Xi'an Aircraft Industrial Corporation is a Chinese aircraft manufacturer and developer of large and medium-sized airplanes. It is based in Yanliang, Xi'an, Shaanxi. In 2020, under a reform, the company became a wholly owned subsidiary of the publicly listed company, AVIC Xi'an Aircraft Industry Group (SZSE: 000768), for stock exchange purposes.

The company's key clients include the People's Liberation Army Naval Air Force and People's Liberation Army Air Force. It is responsible for the production of China's biggest internally manufactured military aircraft, the Xi'an Y-20.

== Products ==
=== Turboprops ===
- Xi'an MA60 turbo-prop airliner
- Xi'an MA600 turbo-prop airliner
- Xi'an MA700 turbo-prop airliner (in development)

=== Bombers and fighter-bombers ===
- Xi'an H-6 twin engine bomber - Chinese-upgraded variant of the Tupolev Tu-16 Badger
- Xi'an H-8 heavy strategic bomber (cancelled)
- Xi'an JH-7 Flying Leopard twin engine fighter-bomber.
- Xi'an H-20 heavy strategic stealth bomber; under development

=== Trainers ===
- Y-7H trainer based on Y-7-100

=== Parts ===
- ACAC ARJ21 Xiangfeng -wings and fuselage
- Boeing 737 - vertical fins, horizontal stabilizers, forward access doors
- Boeing 737NG - vertical fins (30+ year partnership)
- Boeing 747 - trailing edge ribs, aluminum and titanium forgings
- Boeing 747-8 - 747-8 inboard flaps, the single largest piece of aircraft structure that Boeing purchases from China.
- Boeing 787

=== Transport ===
- Yun-7 (Y-7) twin-engine turboprop transport
- Yun-14 (Y-14) twin-engine turboprop transport
- Xi'an Y-20 four-engine turbofan transport
- Xi'an KJ-600 AE&C - using Y-7 based Xi'an JZY-01 as testbed

== Partnerships ==
- Safran Landing Systems

== See also ==
- Xi'an Aero-Engine Corporation
- ACAC consortium
- Aviation Industry Corporation of China
- Changhe Aircraft Industries Corporation
- Chengdu Aircraft Industry Group
- Guizhou Aircraft Industry Co.
- Harbin Aircraft Industry Group
- Hongdu Aviation Industry Corporation
- Shanghai Aviation Industrial Company
- Shaanxi Aircraft Company
- Shenyang Aircraft Corporation
