= AVIC Xi'an Aircraft Industry Group =

Chinese state aerostructure manufacturer

AVIC Xi'an Aircraft Industry Group Company Ltd.
- Native name: 中航西安飞机工业集团股份有限公司
- Type: Subsidiary
- Traded as: SZSE: 000768
- Industry: Aviation, Defense
- Founded: June 26, 1997; 29 years ago
- Headquarters: Xi'an, Shaanxi, China
- Products: Aircraft
- Parent: Aviation Industry Corporation of China
- Website: www.xac.com.cn

AVIC Xi'an Aircraft Industry Group
- Simplified Chinese: 中航西安飞机工业集团股份有限公司
- Traditional Chinese: 中航西安飛機工業集團股份有限公司
Transcriptions
Standard Mandarin
- Hanyu Pinyin: Zhōngháng xī'ān fēijī gōngyè jítuán gǔfèn yǒuxiàn gōngsī

AVIC Xi'an Aircraft Industry Group Company Ltd. (officially abbreviated as AVIC XAC) is a publicly listed state-owned enterprise in Xi'an, Shaanxi, China, which manufactures and markets structural parts and components for aircraft and automobiles. It was founded and listed on the Shenzhen Stock Exchange in 1997.

In 2020, under a reform, the company was placed directly under the Aviation Industry Corporation of China and acquired Xi'an Aircraft Industrial Corporation, which became its wholly owned subsidiary for stock exchange purposes.
