= DAK (disambiguation) =

DAK is an abbreviation for the Afrika Korps (German: Deutsches Afrikakorps), a famed German World War II unit.

DAK, Dak or dak may also refer to:

== Places ==
- Dak, Kerman, Kerman Province, Iran
- Dak, Sistan and Baluchestan, Sistan and Baluchestan Province, Iran
- Dakhla Oasis Airport (IATA airport code: DAK), Egypt
- A shortname for one of the Dakotas

== People ==
- Indian astronomer and soothsayer Dak
- nickname of Dakota North (speedway rider) (born 1991)
- nickname of Dak Prescott (born 1993), American football player
- Dak Wichangoen (born 1986), Danish chef
- Kuzgbour Dak (fl. from 2012) South Sudanese footballer

== Business ==
- DAK Industries, a US discount electronics retailer
- Double Action Kellerman, a trigger-pull variant used by some SIG Sauer pistols
- Dak, a cargo vehicle by Tomos

== Other uses ==
- DAK (gene) (dihydroxyacetone kinase), a human gene
- Douglas Dakota, a Second World War British RAF cargo plane, abbreviated as "Dak"
- Fung Dou Dak, one of the legendary Five Elders in Chinese folklore
- Dakota language, a Native American language (ISO 639-2 and -3 code: dak)
- Dak edition, in India an early edition of a newspaper
- D.A.K., a 1982 board wargame

== See also ==
- Dak Bungalow (disambiguation)
- Dhak (disambiguation)
- Daka (disambiguation)
- Daks (disambiguation)
- DAQ (disambiguation)
- DAC (disambiguation)
- Dack (disambiguation)
