= MSIAC =

MSIAC may refer to:

- Modeling and Simulation Information Analysis Center, of the U.S. Department of Defense
- Munitions Safety Information Analysis Center, of NATO
