= DACS =

DACS may refer to:

- Data & Analysis Center for Software, United States Department of Defense information analysis center
- De La Rue Automatic Cash System, early ATM
- Describing Archives: A Content Standard, standard for describing collections
- Design and Artists Copyright Society, UK copyright collecting society for visual art
- Digital access and cross-connect system, telecommunications equipment in the United States
- Digital Access Carrier System, telecommunications equipment in the United Kingdom
- Distributed Access Control System, single sign-on and role-based access control system
- Dax, Landes, a town in Nouvelle-Aquitaine, France, known in Occitan as Dacs

== See also ==
- DAC (disambiguation)
- Daks (disambiguation)
- Dack (disambiguation)
