= Daks =

Daks or variation, may refer to:

== Events ==
- Daks Day, or Groundhog Day
- Daks Tournament, a golf tournament in England, UK

== Companies, business, organizations ==
- DAKS, a British fashion house
- DAKS Simpson, a department store in Piccadilly, Westminster, London, England, UK
- Dakota Short Line (DAKS), see List of reporting marks: D

== Other uses ==
- daks, or sweatpants
- Daks Davidson (born 1998), an Australian AFLW player of Australian-rules football

== See also ==
- DAK (disambiguation)
- DACS (disambiguation)
- Dack (disambiguation)
