= Context News =

- Headquarters: London, United Kingdom
- Key people: Yasir Khan (Editor-in-Chief)
- Website: www.context.news

Context News, formerly known as Thomson Reuters Foundation News and AlertNet, was a worldwide free news service that that provided in-depth reporting and multimedia content. It contextualised how critical issues and events affected ordinary people, society and the environment. It operated under the Thomson Reuters Foundation, which is the charitable arm of Thomson Reuters.

At its peak, the global editorial team consisted of more than 45 journalists and 150 freelancers, who covered under-reported stories that revolved around climate change, inclusive economies, and technology’s impact on society.

== History ==
Context's earliest incarnation was as AlertNet, which launched in 1997. Then, it was a humanitarian website which acted as a central, neutral resource for aid organisations.

AlertNet relaunched as Thomson Reuters Foundation News, and covered stories that revolved around aid, development, women's rights, human trafficking, property rights, and climate change.

Thomson Reuters Foundation News was then relaunched as Context News in September 2022.

Context ceased publishing in February 2026, following a decline of philanthropic funding.

== Awards ==
=== 2010 ===
The documentary "Surviving the Tsunami: Stories of Hope", a Thomson Reuters Foundation multimedia documentary created for the fifth anniversary of the Indian Ocean tsunami, was nominated for an Emmy award and won a prize at the Best of Photojournalism Awards. The documentary was also a finalist in the 2010 Dart Awards for Excellence in Coverage of Trauma and named Best Web Special Feature by Editor & Publisher.

AlertNet was named a Millennium Product by the British government, an award for outstanding application of innovative technology.

=== 2011 ===
AlertNet was awarded an EPPY Award for the "Best News Website" category.

AlertNet received a gold trophy for "Best News Site" at the Lovie Awards.

In March 2011, the Foundation won the "Best Use of New Media" award for its Emergency Information Service (EIS) at the Third Annual Social Innovation Awards hosted by Justmeans.

=== 2012 ===
The Climate editorial team was selected as an Official Honouree of the 16th Annual Webby Awards in the Green category.

=== 2015 ===
The Foundation won the Asian Environmental Journalism Award for Excellence in Environmental Reporting by a Media Organisation, as well as a United Nations Correspondents Association UN Foundation prize.

=== 2023 ===
==== Editorial awards ====
Context won a Bronze Lovie and People's Lovie Winner in Social: News & Politics award for the platform Openly: LGBTQ+ News on TikTok.

It also won a Bronze Lovie and People's Lovie Winner in Social: News & Politics Awarding body/organisation.

==== Video awards ====
The video “Extreme heat pushed workers to the limits in Qatar’s World Cup building boom” won the Global Media Competition on Labour Migration, ran by the International Labour Organisation. It also won “Best Documentary Film” at the Paris Independent Film Festival.

The video series “Lab-Made: Inside the lab-grown industry” won a Gold Telly, Video Journalism, Online award from the Telly Awards.

=== 2024 ===
==== Editorial awards ====
Context won a Bronze and People’s Lovie - Website & Mobile Site Craft - Best Writing – Editorial for the article “Soaring abuse in UK care jobs shatters migrants’ dreams”.

Context’s Openly platform was a Season 28 Webby Awards Honoree in General Social-News & Politics for Social in the Webby Awards.

==== Video awards ====
Context’s Openly platform won a Short Form Video - News & Politics award from the Lovie Awards.

=== 2025 ===
==== Video awards ====
The video “Fast fashion giant Inditex wants to be sustainable. But is it?” won a Gold Telly, General, Investigative & Open-Source Reporting from the Telly Awards.

The video series “Gig Workers Rising” won a Bronze Telly, Video Journalism, Online from the Telly Awards.

== See also ==
- Index of journalism articles
