= Glycerone kinase =

Type of enzyme

Identifiers
- EC no.: 2.7.1.29
- CAS no.: 9027-47-8

Databases
- BRENDA: enzyme data
- ExPASy: NiceZyme view
- KEGG: enzyme entry
- MetaCyc: metabolic pathway
- Rhea: reactions
- PDB structures: RCSB PDB PDBe PDBsum
- Gene Ontology: AmiGO / QuickGO
Search
- PMC: articles
- PubMed: articles
- NCBI: proteins

A glycerone kinase (EC 2.7.1.29) is an enzyme that catalyzes the chemical reaction

ATP +
dihydroxyacetone
ADP +
dihydroxyacetone phosphate

In humans and multiple other mammals, this enzyme activity is found in the multifunctional enzyme Triokinase/FMN cyclase. This enzyme is found in the liver, and converts dihydroxyacetone (glycerone) to dihydroxyacetone phosphate by transferring a phosphate group from the cofactor, adenosine triphosphate (ATP), which is converted to adenosine diphosphate (ADP).

This enzyme is a transferase, specifically one transferring phosphorus-containing groups (phosphotransferases) with an alcohol group as acceptor. The systematic name of this enzyme class is ATP:glycerone phosphotransferase. Other names in common use include dihydroxyacetone kinase, acetol kinase, and acetol kinase (phosphorylating).

== Structural studies ==
As of late 2007, 6 structures have been solved for this class of enzymes, with PDB accession codes PDB: 1OI2, PDB: 1OI3, PDB: 1UN8, PDB: 1UN9, PDB: 1UOD, and PDB: 1UOE.
