= House at 1141 North Chester Avenue =

Historic house in California, United States

- U.S. National Register of Historic Places
- U.S. Historic district
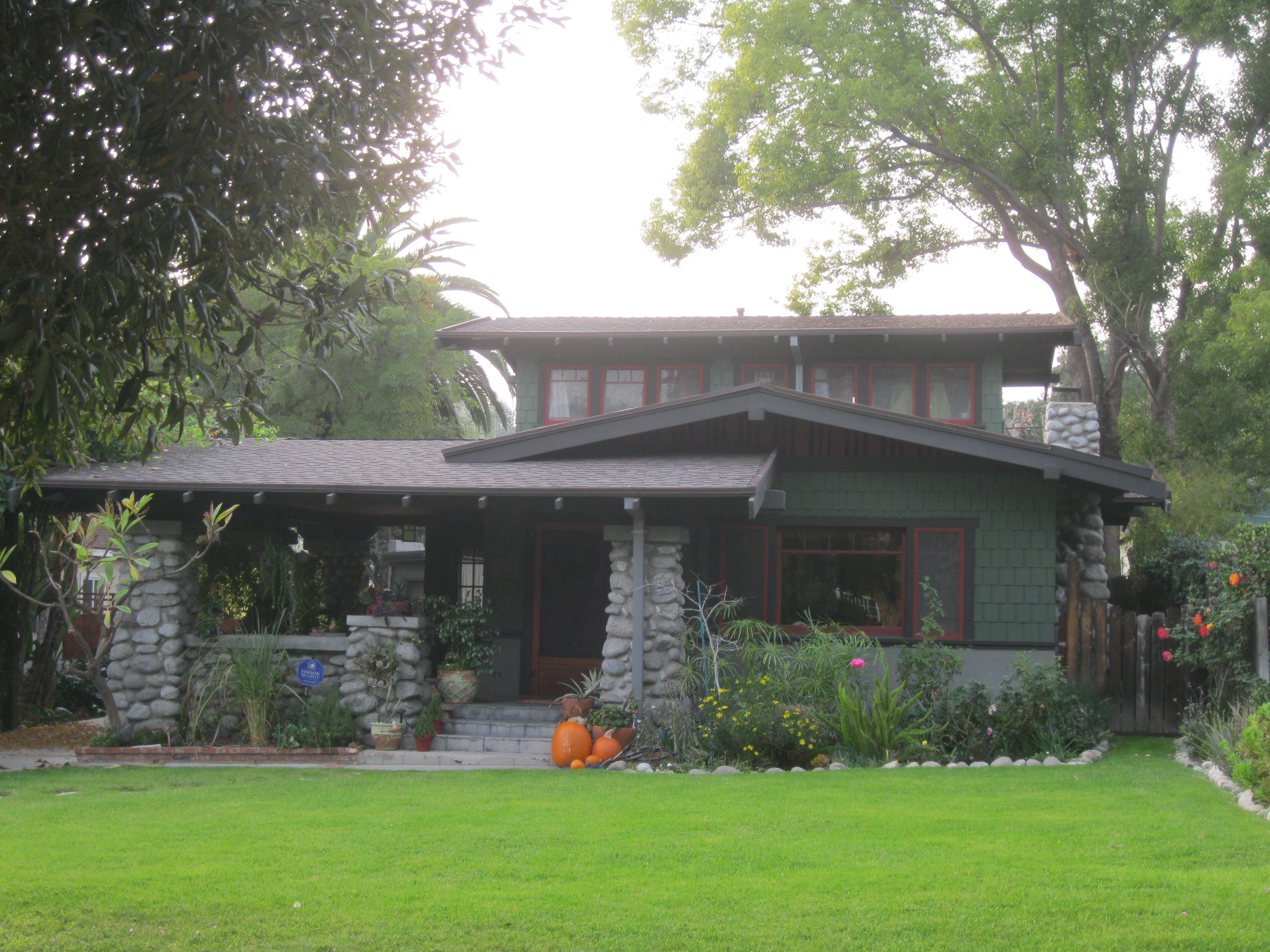

- Location within the Los Angeles metropolitan area Location within California Location within the United States
- Location: 1141 N. Chester Ave., Pasadena, California
- Coordinates: 34°9′57″N 118°7′28″W
- Area: less than one acre
- Built: 1914
- Architect: Jergenson, John A.
- Architectural style: Bungalow
- MPS: Residential Architecture of Pasadena: Influence of the Arts and Crafts Movement MPS
- NRHP reference No.: 04000326
- Added to NRHP: August 20, 2004

The House at 1141 North Chester Avenue is a historic house located at 1141 North Chester Avenue in the Bungalow Heaven district of Pasadena, California. John A. Jergenson designed and built the airplane bungalow for himself and his wife in 1914. The house is wood frame with a stone wall foundation; stone is also used in the four wide piers supporting the porch. The small, central upper story is the characteristic feature of the airplane bungalow design, which takes its name from the half-story's resemblance to an airplane cockpit. The gable roofs on both stories feature wide, overhanging eaves and exposed rafter tails.

The house was added to the National Register of Historic Places on June 14, 2014.
