= DAQ =

DAQ or variation, may refer to:

- Data acquisition, the sampling of real-world signals to generate data that can be manipulated by a computer
- Delivered Audio Quality, a measure of audio quality over a transmission medium
- Madiya language (ISO 639 language code: daq)
- Changping railway station (Guangdong) (station code DAQ), in Changping, Dongguang, Guangdong, China
- "DAQ", the code for Dominion Arsenal; see List of military headstamps
- DJ DaQ, disc jockey on Show Me the Money (South Korean TV series) seasons 4, 5, 6

== See also ==
- DAC (disambiguation)
- DAK (disambiguation)
- Dack (disambiguation)
