= DAC =

DAC may refer to:

== Businesses and organisations ==
- DacEasy, originally Dac Software, Inc.
- Danish Architecture Centre, an international cultural attraction
- Defense Ammunition Center (United States), of the United States Department of Defense
- Democratic Action Congress, a political party in Trinidad and Tobago
- Designated activity company, a type of company in Ireland
- Development Assistance Committee of the Organisation for Economic Co-operation and Development
- Direct Action Committee, a British peace campaign 1957–1961
- Distributed autonomous corporation, an organization managed by a decentralized computer program
- Domain Awareness Center, an anti-crime initiative in Oakland, California, U.S.

== People ==
=== Surname ===
- Fin DAC, Irish street artist (pseudonym)
- Jean Dac (Hans von Aachen, 1552–1615), German painter
- Pierre Dac (1893–1975), French humorist

=== Initials ===
- David Allan Coe (born 1939), American country musician and singer
- Darializa Avila Chevalier, American politician and activist

== Sports and games ==
- Dakota Athletic Conference, in North Dakota and South Dakota, U.S.
- Duneland Athletic Conference, in Indiana, U.S.
- Daskalakis Athletic Center, an athletic and recreational facility in Philadelphia, Pennsylvania, U.S.
- Detroit Athletic Club, in Detroit, Michigan, U.S.
- FC DAC 1904 Dunajská Streda, a Slovak football team
- Dota 2 Asia Championships 2015 or DAC 2015, a Dota 2 tournament
- Dota Auto Chess, a mod within Dota 2 that was the first prominent autobattler

== Science and technology ==
- Direct air capture, to extract carbon dioxide directly from air
- Digital-to-analog converter, a system that converts a digital signal into an analog signal
- DAC, a 16mm Data Acquisition Camera used on Skylab

=== Mechanics ===
- Double-acting Cylinder, a type of pneumatic cylinder
- Diamond anvil cell, a high-pressure device used in geology and engineering

=== Human biology / medicine ===
- Standard-dose cytarabine plus daunorubicin (DAC), a form of 7+3 (chemotherapy)
- D-acetylcarnitine

=== Software / Information Technology ===
- Discretionary access control, in computer security
- Direct Attach Copper, a 10 Gigabit Ethernet connector
- Microsoft Data Access Components, or Windows DAC, a framework of interrelated Microsoft technologies

== Transportation ==
=== Road ===
- DAC (automobile), a 1922–1923 American car by the Detroit Air-Cooled Car Company
- DAC (vehicle manufacturer), a Romanian truck manufacturer
- Rocar DAC, a series of Romanian buses and trolleybuses

=== Rail ===
- Digital Automatic Coupling, a railway coupling
- Dahinsara Junction railway station, Gujarat, India, station code DAC

=== Air ===
- DAC Air, defunct Romanian airline
- Daily Air, a Taiwanese airline, ICAO airline code DAC
- Direction de l'Aviation Civile, a government agency of Luxembourg
- Dutch Aeroplane Company, manufacturer of the DAC RangeR
- Hazrat Shahjalal International Airport, Dhaka, Bangladesh, IATA airport code DAC

== Other uses ==
- Dac, or Mon Cala, a Star Wars planet
- Deferred acquisition costs, in insurance
- Deputy assistant commissioner (Metropolitan Police), in London, England
- Design Automation Conference, an annual event
- Directive on Administrative Co-operation in the field of Taxation (2011/16), an EU directive
- Districtus Austriae Controllatus, a classification for Austrian wine
- Dambi, ISO 639-3 language code dac, a dialect of Mumeng language
- Star Trek DAC, a video game

== See also ==
- DACS (disambiguation)
- DAQ (disambiguation)
- DAK (disambiguation)
- Dack (disambiguation)
