= Bungalow (disambiguation) =

A bungalow is a small house or cottage that is either single-story or has a second story built into a sloping roof.

Bungalow or The Bungalow may also refer to:

== Film and TV ==
- Bungalow (2002 film), a 2002 German film
- Bungalow (2022 film), a 2022 Canadian film
- "The Bungalow", an episode in the 4th season of the TV series Dynasty, 1981

== Places ==
- Bungalow, Queensland, a suburb of Cairns
- The Bungalow, an institution for "half-caste" Aboriginal children and some adults between 1914 and 1960 in Alice Springs, Northern Territory, Australia
- The Bungalow, Isle of Man, a vantage point on the Snaefell Mountain Course, Isle of Man
  - Bungalow railway station

== See also ==
- Dak Bungalow (disambiguation)
- Bungalow 2, a 2007 novel by Danielle Steel
- Bungalow 8, a former nightclub chain
- Bungalow 13, a 1948 American crime drama film
- Bungalow 702, a heritage-listed house on Christmas Island, Australia
- Bungalow court, a style of multi-family housing developed in Pasadena, California, in the 1910s
- Bungalow Heaven, Pasadena, California, a neighbourhood
- The Bungalow on the Beach, a 17th-century house built by the Governor of Danish India, now a hotel, in Tharangambadi, Tamil Nadu, India.
- The Bungalow Mystery (1930), a novel in the Nancy Drew series
- Bungalow (restaurant), a restaurant in New York City
