= DTTX =

DTTX may refer to:

- Sfax – Thyna International Airport
- A reporting mark of the TTX Company
- DTTX a rapper
