= Dak Bungalow (disambiguation) =

Dak Bungalow or Bangalow (Hindi: Dakbangla) may refer to any of the many dak bungalows erected during the 19th century by the British Raj.

It may refer more specifically to:

- Dak Bungalow Road, thoroughfares in several Indian, Bangladeshi, and Pakistani cities
- Dak Bungalow Crossing, Patna, neighbourhood in Patna, Bihar, India
  - Dak Bungalow, a stop on the Patna Metro
- Ari Bangla, a landmark in Aritar, Sikkim, India
- Quaid-e-Azam tourist lodge, Barsala, Pakistan

== See also ==
- DAK (disambiguation)
- Bungalow (disambiguation)
- Daftarkhana, also known as Old Dak Bungalow, a landmark in Fatehpur Sikri near Agra in India
