= Dak Bungalow Crossing, Patna =

Coordinates: 25°36′36″N 85°08′16″E

Dak Bungalow Crossing
- Neighbourhood in Patna
- Nicknames: Dak Bungalow Chowraha; Dak Bungalow Roundabout
- Interactive map of Dak Bungalow Crossing
- State: Bihar
- City: Patna
- District: Patna
- Boundaries: Bailey Road; Fraser Road; Dak Bungalow Road
- Subway services: Patna Metro (Upcoming)
- Historical features: Dak Bungalow Patna (Demolished)

Dak Bungalow Crossing is a major commercial intersection, entertainment center and neighborhood in the central section of Patna. It is located at the junction of Bailey Road and Fraser Road. It is one of the busiest pedestrian and automobile areas in the city of Patna. Lok Nayak Jay Prakash Commercial Complex is located on the south west corner of the cross road - which was the erstwhile location of historic Dak Bungalow of Patna. South east corner has historic departmental stores of Patna such as Roshan Brothers, J.G.Carr & Sons and Khanna Stores. Multiple showrooms and shops are lined up on all sides of the crossroad.

== History ==
Dak Bungalow Crossing is named after a British era historic Dak Bungalow of Patna which stood on the south west corner of intersection. The one-story tiled Dak Bungalow complex building was a government building in British India during Company Rule and the British Raj. The iconic building had hosted personalities like Jim Corbett, E M Forster among others. It was used by travelers and government officials traveling on that route.

In the 1990s the Dak Bungalow was demolished and a commercial complex - Lok Nayak Jay Prakash Commercial Complex - was built in its place. The complex has number of government offices, banks and shops.

== General Information ==
Dak Bungalow crossing is one of the most busiest crossing in the city of Patna with a number of showrooms and shops on all sides. Some of the major Shopping outlets in the area include Patna Central, showrooms of clothing and electronic brands like Reebok, Allen Solly, Samsung and LG among others. The area also has number of Bank branches such as Axis Bank, Punjab & Sindh Bank, Dena Bank, Syndicate Bank, State Bank of India, Central Bank of India and scores of ATMs. The area also has a number of government and public sector offices such as NTPC, Indian Oil Corporation and Income Tax.

== Transport and Connectivity ==
Dak Bungalow Chowk Bus Stop is the main bus stop in the area and connects it to other parts of the city. Auto rickshaws and Paddle rickshaws can also be hailed from the area to Railway Station, Airport and other residential and commercial areas of Patna. Patna Junction is around 1 km south from the crossing.

== Police Stations ==
Kotwali Thana of Patna Police serve this neighbourhood.

== Durga Puja Celebrations ==
Dak Bungalow Crossing is famous for Durga Puja celebrations and theme based pandals. It is one of the most famous pandals of Patna during Durga Puja and thousands of devotees visit it.

== IT Tower ==
A proposed IT Tower is scheduled to come up near the crossing. The building will accommodate employees and companies from the Information Technology Industry.
