= Index of journalism articles =

Articles related to the field of journalism include:

== 0–9 ==
- 24-hour news cycle
- 2003 invasion of Iraq media coverage

== A ==
- Advocacy journalism
- Afghanistanism
- AP Stylebook
- Assignment editor

== B ==
- Beat reporting
- Breaking news

== C ==
- Chart
- Chicago circulation wars
- Citizen journalism
- Columnist
- Copy editing
- Creative nonfiction

== D ==
- Dak edition
- Decline of newspapers
- Deep Throat
- Desktop publishing

== E ==
- Editing
- Editor
- Editorial
- Editorial board
- Editorial independence
- Editorial page
- Embedded journalist
- Eyewitness News

== F ==
- First Amendment to the United States Constitution
- Fourth Estate
- Freedom of the press
- Free newspaper

== G ==
- Gag order
- Gotcha journalism
- Graphic design

== H ==
- Headline
- Headlinese
- Hedcut
- History of American newspapers
- Hostile media effect
- House style

== I ==
- Information graphic
- Inverted pyramid (journalism)
- Investigative journalism
- Interpretive journalism

== J ==
- Journalese
- Journalism
- Journalism ethics and standards
- Journalism scandals
- Journalism school
- Journalist

== L ==
- Letter to the editor
- List of daily news podcasts
- List of newspapers
- Literary journalism
- Local news

== M ==
- Magazine
- Managing editor
- Mass media
- Masthead
- Media balance
- Media bias
- Muckraker

== N ==
- Nameplate
- New Journalism
- News
- News agency
- News design
- News media
- News release
- News source
- News style
- News values
- Newseum
- Newspaper
- Newspaper circulation
- Newsprint

== O ==
- Obituary
- Objectivity
- Online newspaper
- Op-ed

== P ==
- Pie chart
- Photojournalism
- Print syndication
- Printing
- Proofreading
- Publisher
- Pulitzer Prize

== R ==
- Remembrance Day of Journalists Killed in the Line of Duty
- Reporter
- Profession

== S ==
- Science journalism
- Sob sister (journalism)
- Sportswriting
- Star-Ledger
- Style guide

== T ==
- Tabloid journalism
- Teletype
- Television news
- Typography

== Y ==
- Yellow journalism
