= Munitions Safety Information Analysis Center =

Project of the North Atlantic Treaty Organization (NATO)

NATO Munitions Safety Information Analysis Center Centre d'information et d'analyse sur la sécurité des munitions de l'OTAN
- Formation: 1991
- Type: NATO project
- Headquarters: Brussels, Belgium
- Members: 16 states: Australia; Belgium; Canada; Denmark; Finland; France; Germany; Italy; Netherlands; Norway; Poland; Spain; Sweden; Switzerland; United Kingdom; United States
- Official language: English; French
- MSIAC Steering Committee Chairman: Daniel Pudlak
- MSIAC Project Manager: Christopher Hollands
- Website: https://www.msiac.nato.int

Munitions Safety Information Analysis Center, also referred to as MSIAC, is a NATO project funded directly by its member nations, not all of which are NATO members. There are currently 16 member nations: Australia, Belgium, Canada, Denmark, Finland, France, Germany, Italy, Netherlands, Norway, Spain, Sweden, United Kingdom, United States, Poland, and Switzerland.

== Services ==
The NATO Munitions Safety Information Analysis Center (MSIAC) (Centre d'information et d'analyse sur la sécurité des munitions de l'OTAN (CIASM) in French) provides technical consultancy services in the area of munitions safety to its member nations.

MSIAC's mission is to help its member nations to

"Eliminate safety risks from unintended reactions of munitions and energetic materials throughout their lifecycle”.

To enable this, one Technical Specialist Officer (TSO) is appointed per area of expertise:

- Energetic materials – high explosives, gun propellants, rocket propellants and pyrotechnics; providing advice and expertise on synthesis, formulation and characterization;
- Warhead Technology – warhead concept, design, manufacturing, testing, and related technologies;
- Propulsion Technology – design and through-life safety of munition propulsion systems;
- Munitions Systems – assessment of safety and suitability for service (S3), testing and risk management for munition systems;
- Munitions Transport and Storage Safety – safety principles and regulations for transport and storage, hazard classification and risk analysis;
- Materials Technology – interactions of structure/composition, processing, properties, and performance of materials as applied to munition systems and their components;
- Electromagnetic Environment Effects (E3) on Munitions - providing advice and expertise on the effects of the electromagnetic environment on munition safety.

Within these areas, MSIAC performs the following activities:

- Answering technical questions submitted by member nation personnel
- Development of software tools supporting munition safety activities throughout the munition lifecycle
- Conducting visits to member nations to discuss their munition safety concerns
- Participation in international munition safety conferences
- Hosting technical meetings and workshops which bring the munition safety community together to discuss topics of mutual interest
- Sponsorship of training courses on various munition safety-related topics
- In-depth research into critical munition safety related topics, and publication of open- and limited-distribution reports
- Curation of an extensive collection of munition safety related publications and standards, many of which are directly accessible to their members

== History ==
=== Pilot-NATO Insensitive Munition Information Center (Pilot-NIMIC) ===
On May 26, 1988, NATO nations—France, the Netherlands, Norway, the United Kingdom, and the United States—signed a Memorandum of Understanding to establish Pilot-NIMIC (NATO Insensitive Munitions Information Center). The organization was created to support national and international programs in the development of insensitive munitions (IM).

The idea for NIMIC originated at the NATO AC/310 Workshop on Insensitive Munitions Information Exchange in 1986. It was strongly championed by AC/310 Chairman IGA M. Thévenin and Principal U.S. Member Dr. R. Derr. The initiative was driven by NATO Group AC/310 (Safety and Suitability for Service of Munitions and Explosives) to assist munitions developers across NATO countries.

The PILOT-NIMIC office was established at Applied Physics Laboratory (APL) of Johns Hopkins University in Laurel, Maryland, USA. The initial team consisted of a project manager and five technical specialists, a structure that remains largely unchanged in its modern counterpart, MSIAC. Shortly after its founding, Canada joined the project in late 1989.

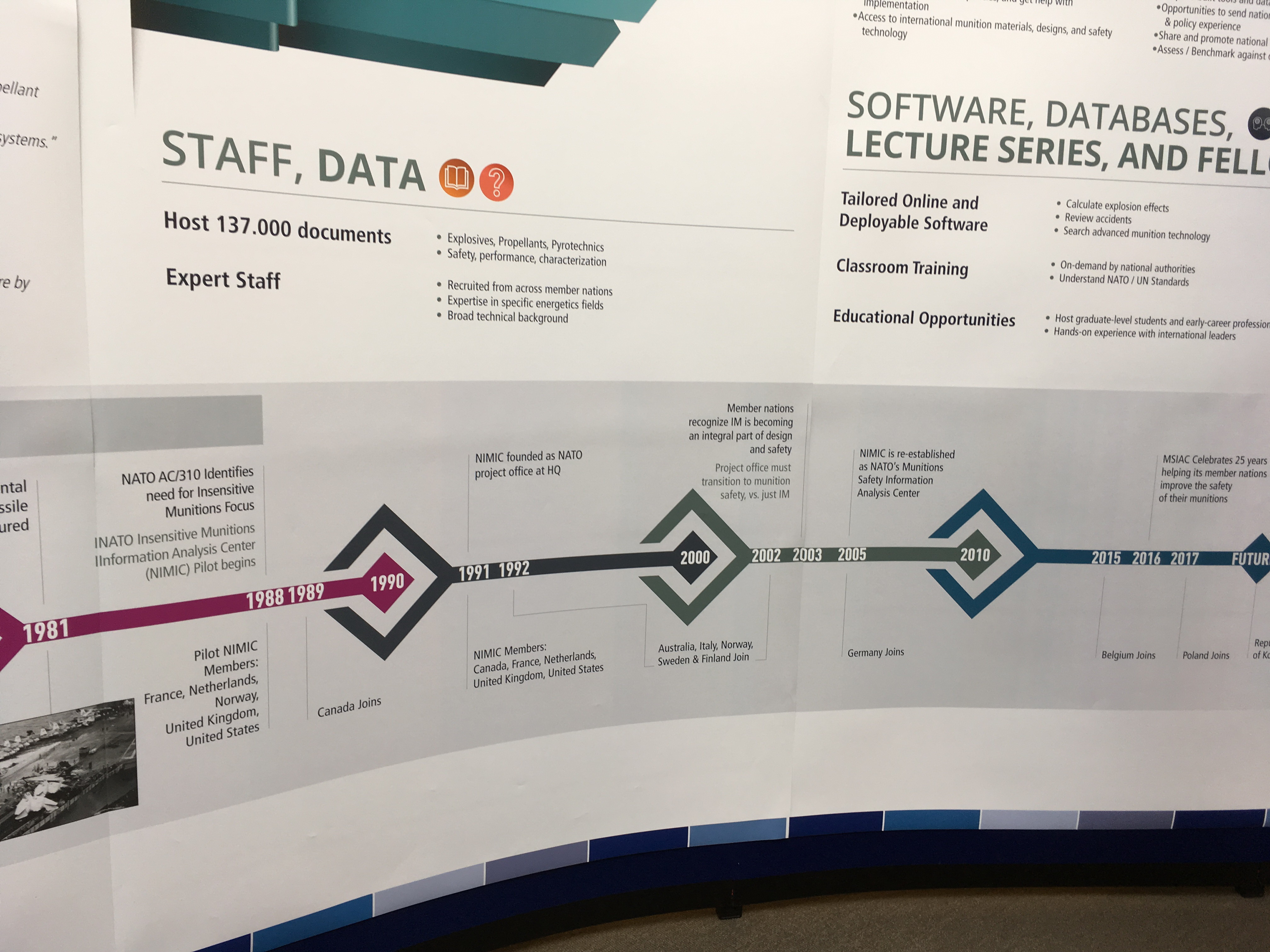
History of MSIAC

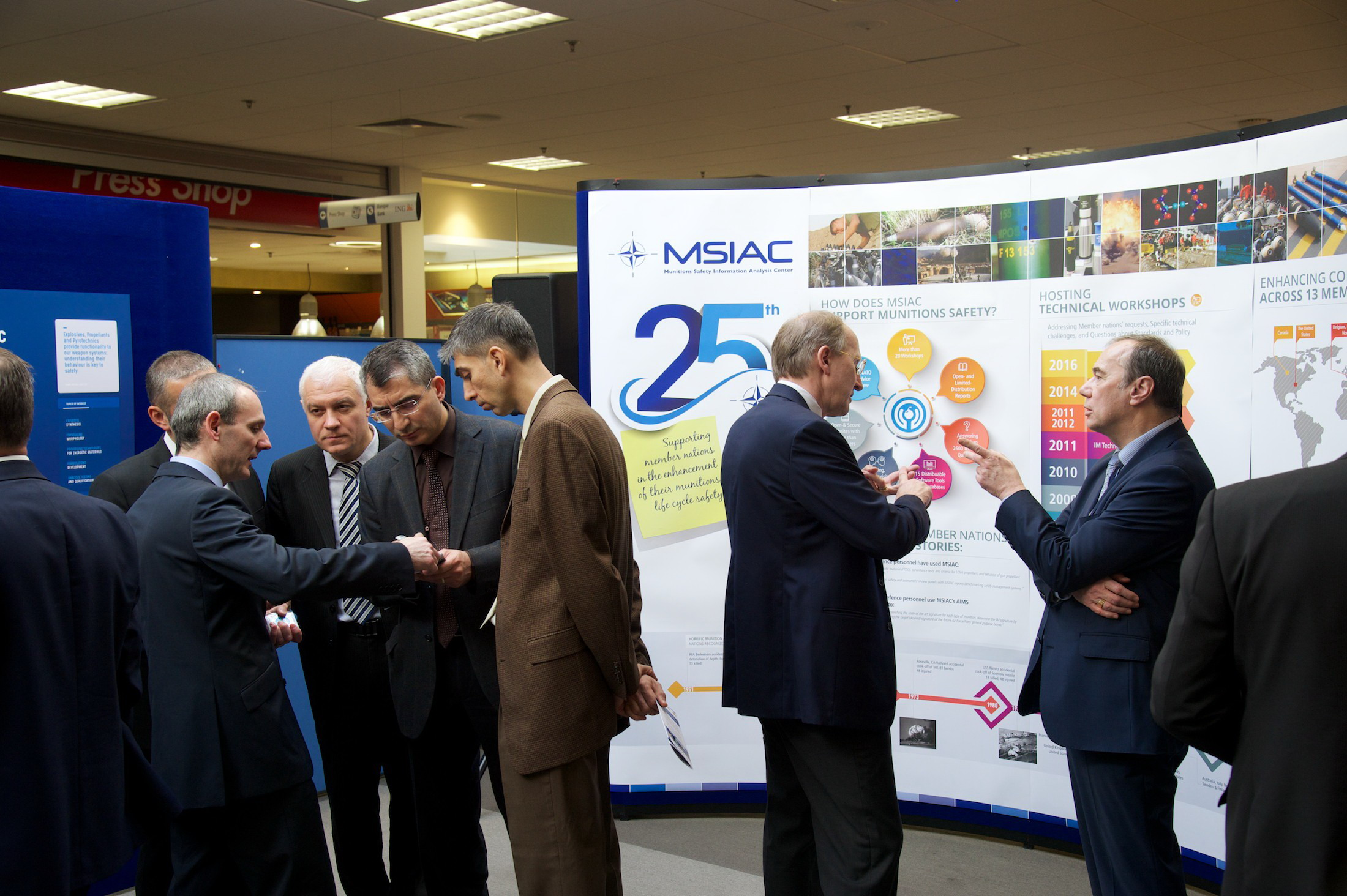
MSIAC and АС/326 (CASG) experts on Celebrating 25 Years of MSIAC (15 december, 2016)

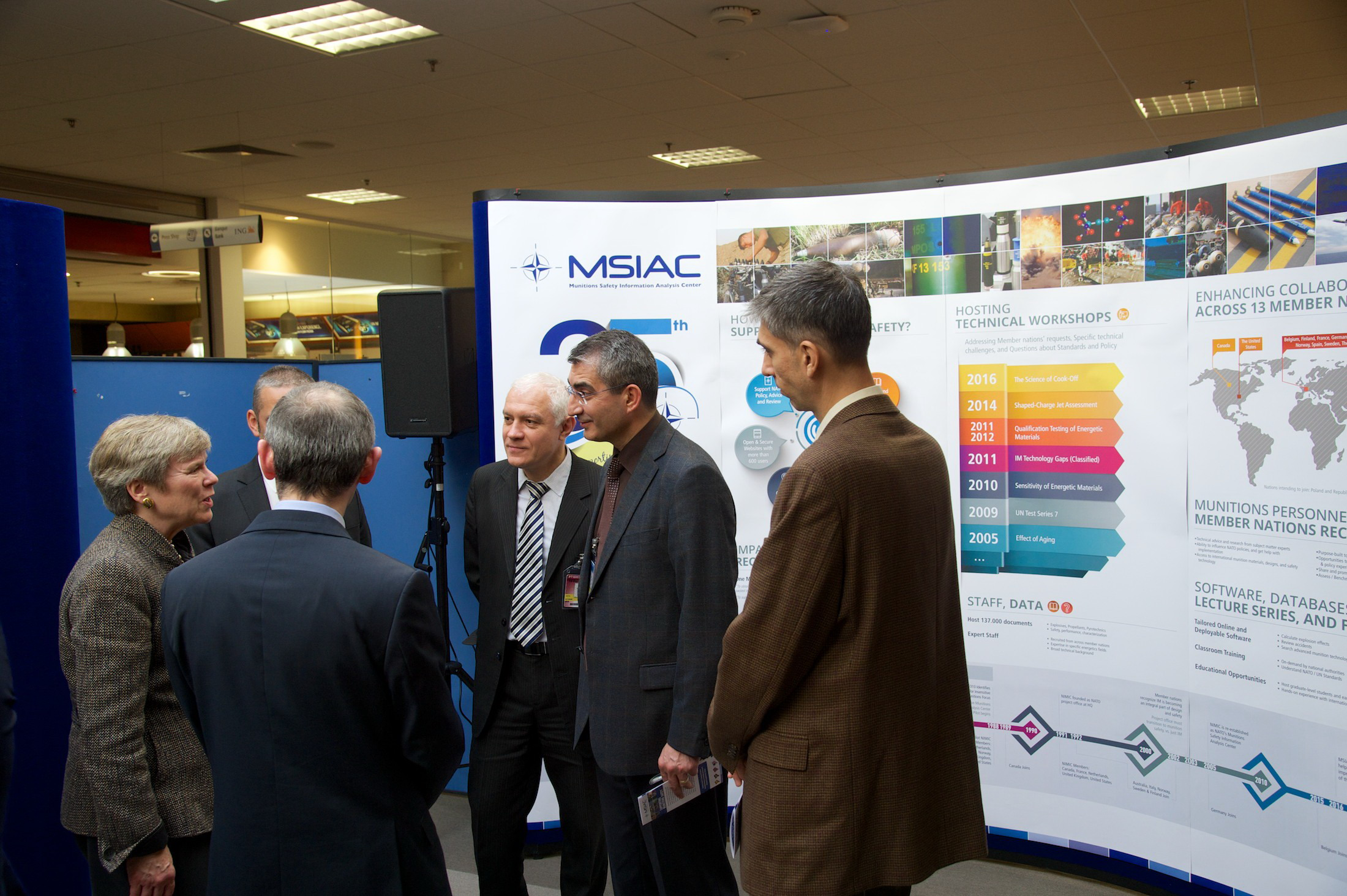
Celebrating 25 Years of MSIAC (15 december, 2016)

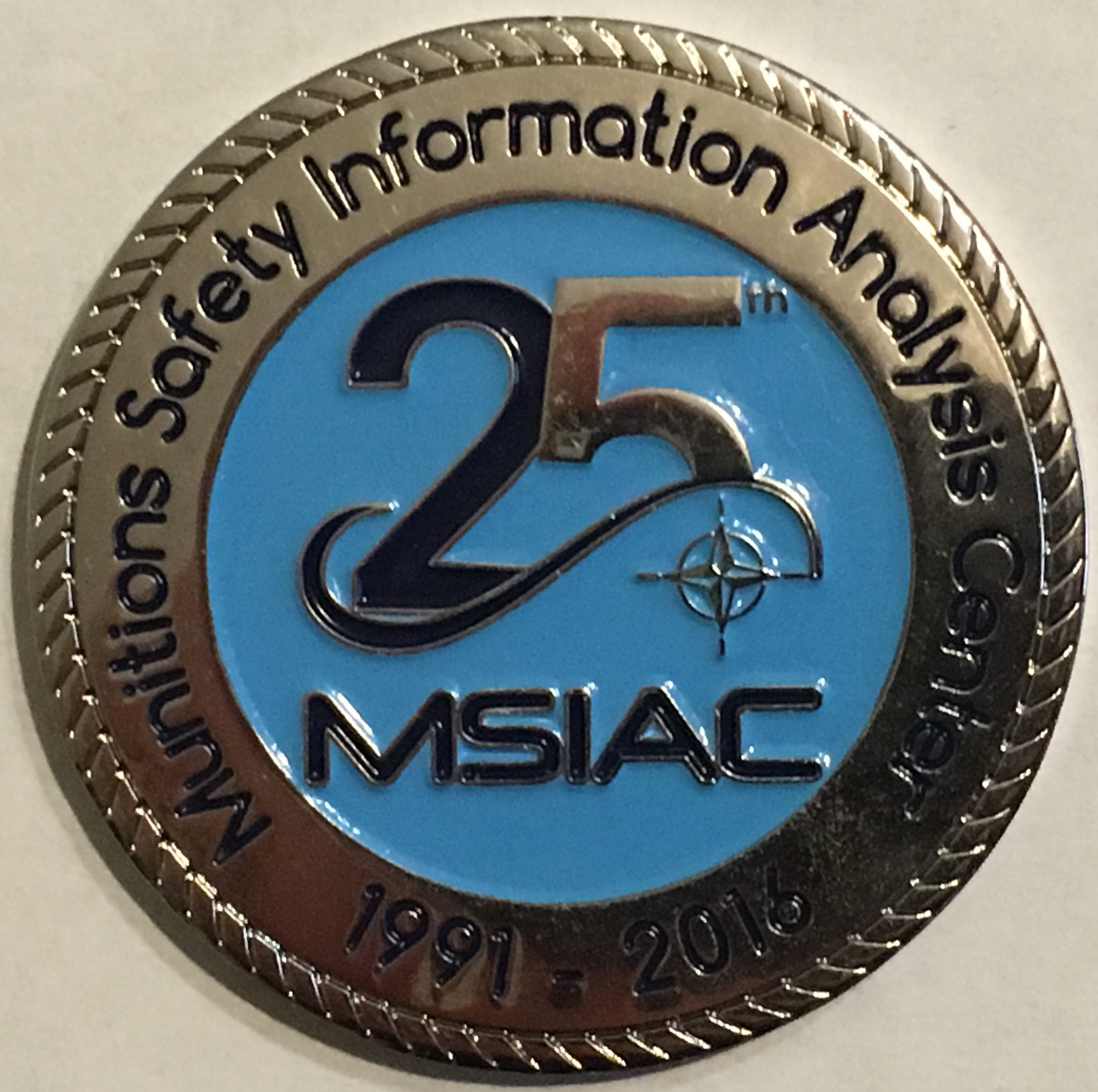
Medal to 25th Celebrate of MSIAC (avers)

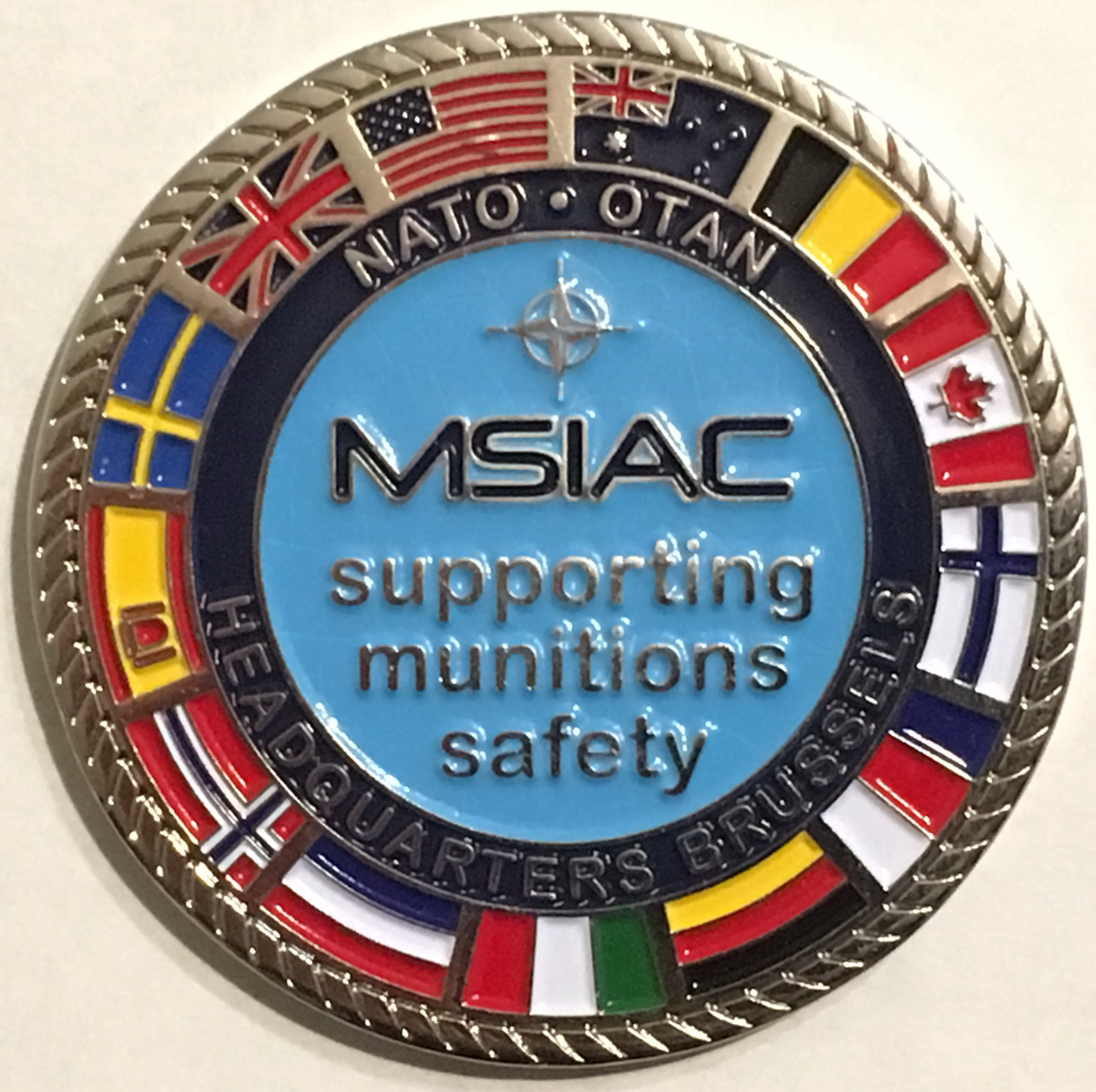
Medal to 25th Celebrate of MSIAC (reverse)

=== NIMIC Move to Brussels and Growth ===
After two successful years of operation, the project moved to NATO Headquarters in Brussels and was officially renamed NIMIC on May 1, 1991. Membership gradually expanded, with Spain and Australia joining in 1994, followed by Portugal and Italy in 1995. However, Portugal withdrew from NIMIC in 1998. Denmark joined in 1999 but left in 2004. Sweden and Finland became members in 2002.

=== Merger of AC/258 and AC/310 and Transition to MSIAC ===
In May 2003, the Conference of National Armament Directors (CNAD) Ammunition Safety Group (AC/326 or CASG) was established through the merger of two former NATO groups: AC/258, which focused on the safety aspects of transporting and storing military ammunition and explosives, and AC/310, which oversaw the safety and suitability for service of munitions and explosives.

With this broader emphasis on munitions safety, it was decided to expand NIMIC’s scope to align with the new framework. This led to the transition toward the Munitions Safety Information Analysis Center (MSIAC), beginning with the Pilot MSIAC phase in the spring of 2003. The transition was successfully completed by late 2004, and MSIAC became officially operational on December 15, 2004.

=== Further growth as MSIAC ===
Germany joined the project in 2005, followed by Belgium in 2015. Poland became a member in 2017, Switzerland joined in 2022, and Denmark rejoined in 2025. As MSIAC continues to grow, it remains committed to enhancing munitions safety and supporting its expanding network of member nations.

== Organization ==
The MSIAC Project Office is composed of a Steering Committee, National Focal Point Officers (NFPO), and the Munitions Safety Information Analysis Center (MSIAC). The Steering Committee includes one voting representative from each member nation and an elected chair. It is responsible for implementing the Memorandum of Understanding (MOU) that established MSIAC and for shaping its policy. The MSIAC Project Manager oversees the day-to-day execution of this policy.

== List of officials ==
Chairs of the NIMIC & MSIAC Steering Committee
#	Name	Country	Duration
1	Dr. Ron Derr	United States	1991–1998
2	Anthony Melita	United States	1998–2005
3	CPT Jacqui King RAN	Australia	2005–2008
4	Dr. Jerry Ward	United States	2009-2011
5	GPCPT Wade Evans OBE	Australia	2011–2014
6	LtCol Tony Heron	Canada	2014–2016
7	Dr Brian Fuchs	United States	2016–2024
8	Daniel Pudlak	United States	2024–

PNIMIC, NIMIC, & MSIAC Project Manager
#	Name	Country	Duration
1	Henry F. Hege	United States	1989
2	George M. Starken	United States	1989
3	Edward Daugherty	United States	1990–1991
4	GEN Marc Défourneaux	France	1992–1995
5	GEN Michel Thévenin	France	1995–1998
6	Dr. Peter Lee	United Kingdom	1998–2002
7	BGN Patrick Touzé	France	2002–2010
8	Roger L. Swanson	United States	2010–2013
9	Dr. Michael W. Sharp	United Kingdom	2013–2019
10	Charles Denham	United States	2019–2024
11	Christopher Hollands	United Kingdom	2024–
