= DAC (automobile) =

Former US automobile manufacturer

Detroit Air Cooled Car
- Industry: Automotive
- Founded: 1922
- Founder: W.J. Doughty
- Defunct: Late 1923
- Fate: Ceased Operations
- Headquarters: Detroit, MI 1922-Wayne, MI 1923
- Products: Air Cooled Automobiles
- Production output: Total Production Around 100 Cars

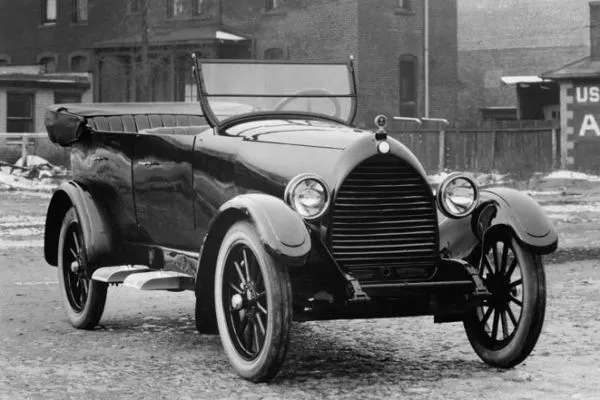
1922 D.A.C. Phaeton

The D.A.C. was an automobile manufactured in Detroit, Michigan and later Wayne, Michigan by the Detroit Air-Cooled Car Company from 1922 to 1923.

== History ==
The Detroit Air Cooled Car (shortened to D.A.C) debuted at the Detroit Auto show in early 1922. The firm was led by W.J. Doughty, a man who had been an automotive dealer for 18 years; and G.R.Tremolda, the man who designed the car, and had spent time designing vehicles in Europe before being with D.A.C.

The company would be headquartered at 3745 Cass Avenue in Detroit Michigan. In an effort to grow the company's dealer base, it was reported that "orders from dealers for thousands of cars [are] already on hand." In August 1922 it was being reported that production was close to starting. Initial plans were for producing 10,000 cars a year. Approximately 25 cars were built in the Detroit factory on Cass Avenue.

By late 1922 plans had shifted and the former Harron Motor Company factory in Wayne Michigan had been bought. Production plans had been pushed back and the company now expected to start production in December of that year. Once production began the company hoped to build 50 cars a day. And the company boasted dealers and distributors in over 40 cities.

In early 1923 an additional 10 acres of land would be purchased in Wayne Michigan for another factory. The main offices were moved from Detroit to Wayne around this time as well. In July of the same year the company would issue $1,200,000 worth of stock to fund expansion. But given the fact that the company would be out of business within the year, this issue was likely for survival. The company would not make it to 1924, and around 100 cars were made.

== Detroit Air Cooled Car ==
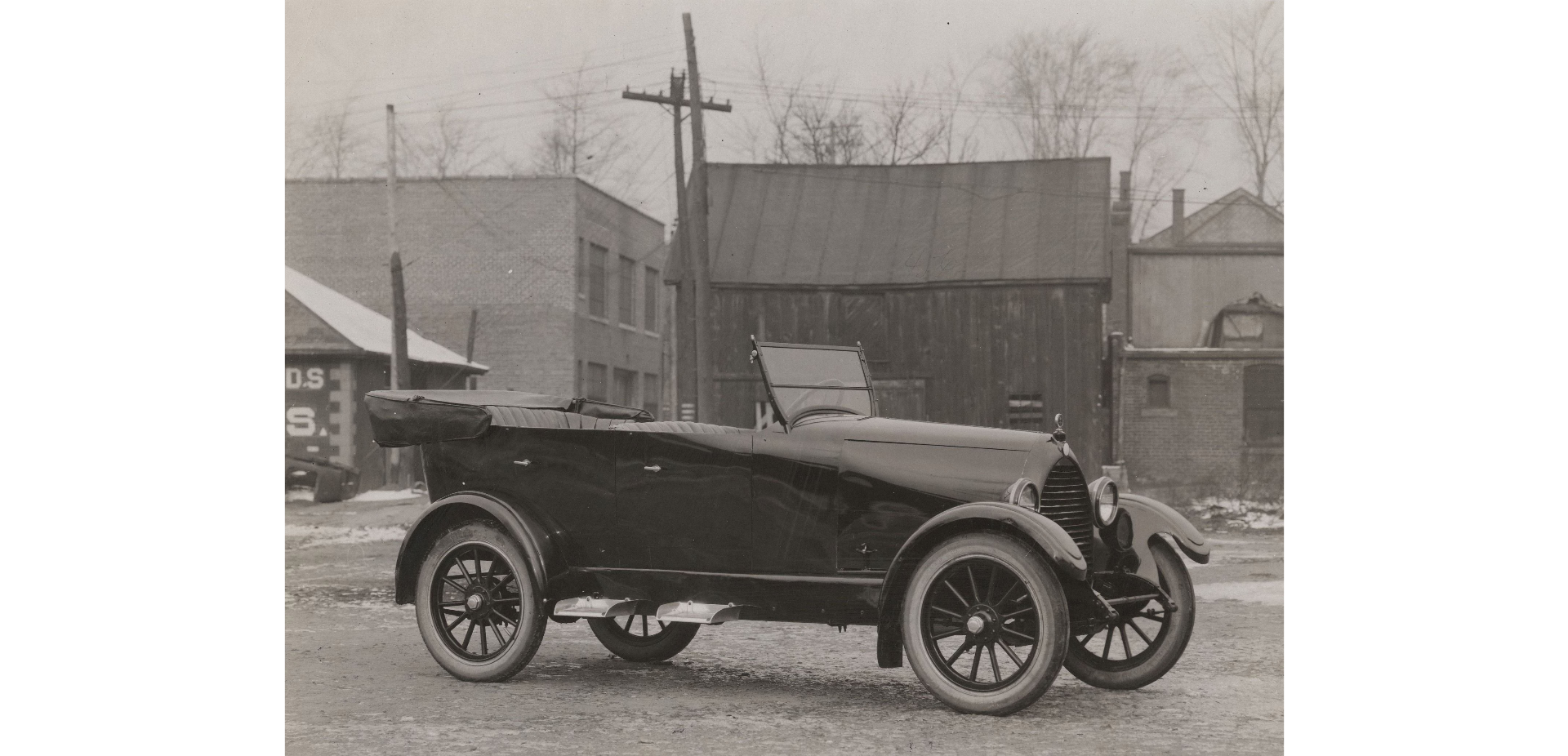
1922 Detroit Air Cooled Car

The car that the company produced (known simply as the Detroit Air-Cooled Car) was a fairly average looking car on a 115-inch wheelbase. The first model advertised was an open touring car. The motor was a very unusual air cooled overhead valve V6 motor (being produced decades before Lancia's first V6 in 1950) and made 32 horsepower at 2700 RPM. It was reported that the car could achieve 30 miles to the gallon. The motor was kept cool by over 20 cooling fins per cylinder and a fan along with chutes to direct air.

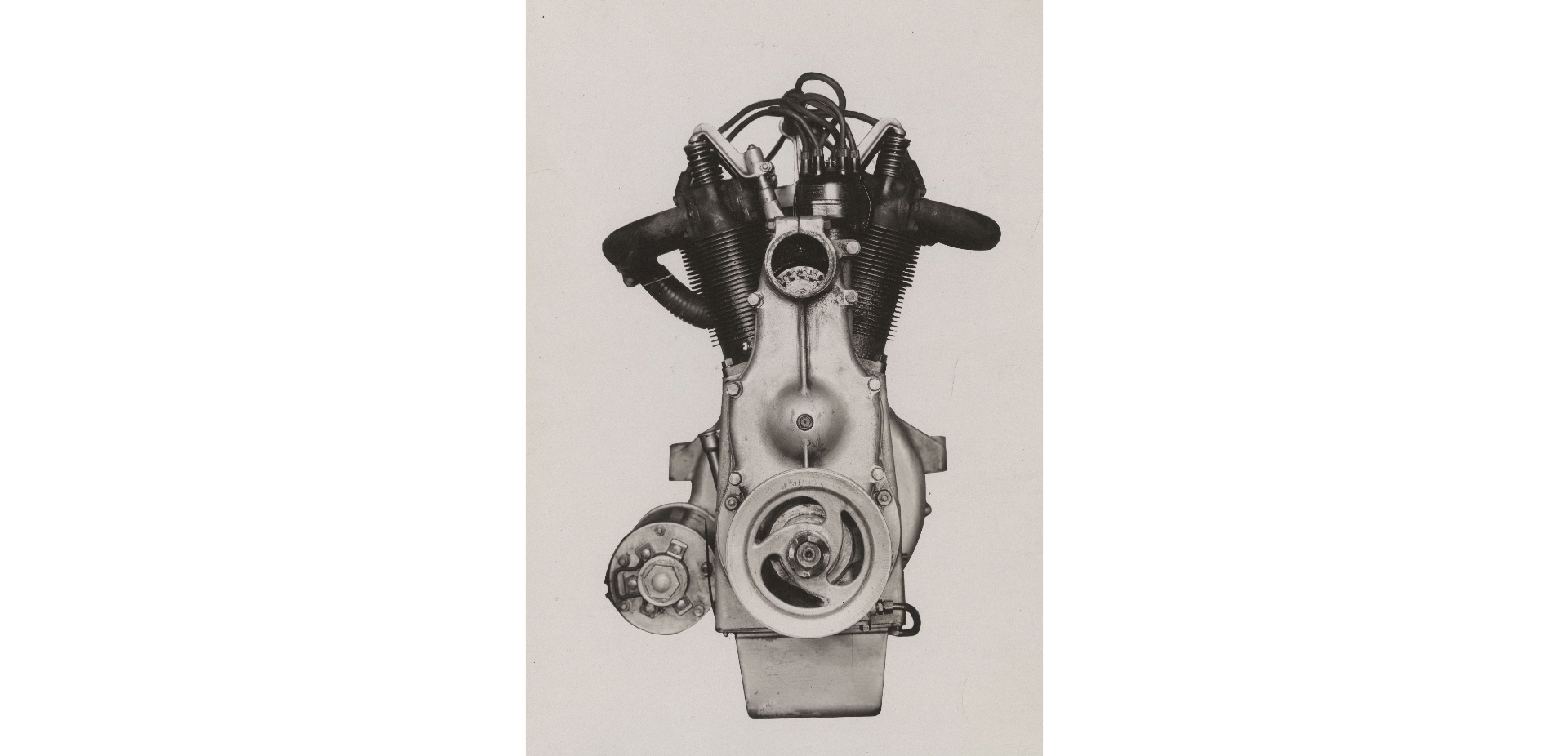
Detroit Air Cooled Car Engine 1922

The transmission was a three speed selective gear type. Fuel capacity was 12 pounds. Normal braking was through a transmission brake, and an emergency brake on the rear wheels was also offered. An unusual feature was that the throttle and horn were on the same mechanism presumably on the steering wheel, a turn of the wheel would throttle up and a press down would honk the horn. Prices ranged from $1250 for the touring car, to $1700 for the coupe and $1750 for the sedan.

== See also ==
- List of defunct automobile manufacturers
