= Delivered Audio Quality =

Delivered Audio Quality, abbreviated as DAQ, is a measure of audio quality over a transmission medium. This metric is often used to quantify the quality of audio heard over a radio system. DAQ levels are defined by the following scale.

- DAQ 1: Unusable. Speech present but not understandable.
- DAQ 2: Speech understandable with considerable effort. Requires frequent repetition due to noise or distortion.
- DAQ 3: Speech understandable with slight effort. Requires occasional repetition due to noise or distortion.
- DAQ 3.4: Speech understandable without repetition. Some noise or distortion present.
- DAQ 4: Speech easily understandable. Little noise or distortion.
- DAQ 5: Perfect. No distortion or noise discernible.

== Sources ==
- TIA (Telecommunications Industry Association) TSB-88-A
- http://www.its.bldrdoc.gov/pub/ntia-rpt/99-358/99-358.pdf
