= Bungalow Heaven, Pasadena, California =

Neighborhood in Pasadena, California

Coordinates: 34.16341°N 118.12686°W

- Bungalow Heaven Historic District
- U.S. National Register of Historic Places
- U.S. Historic district
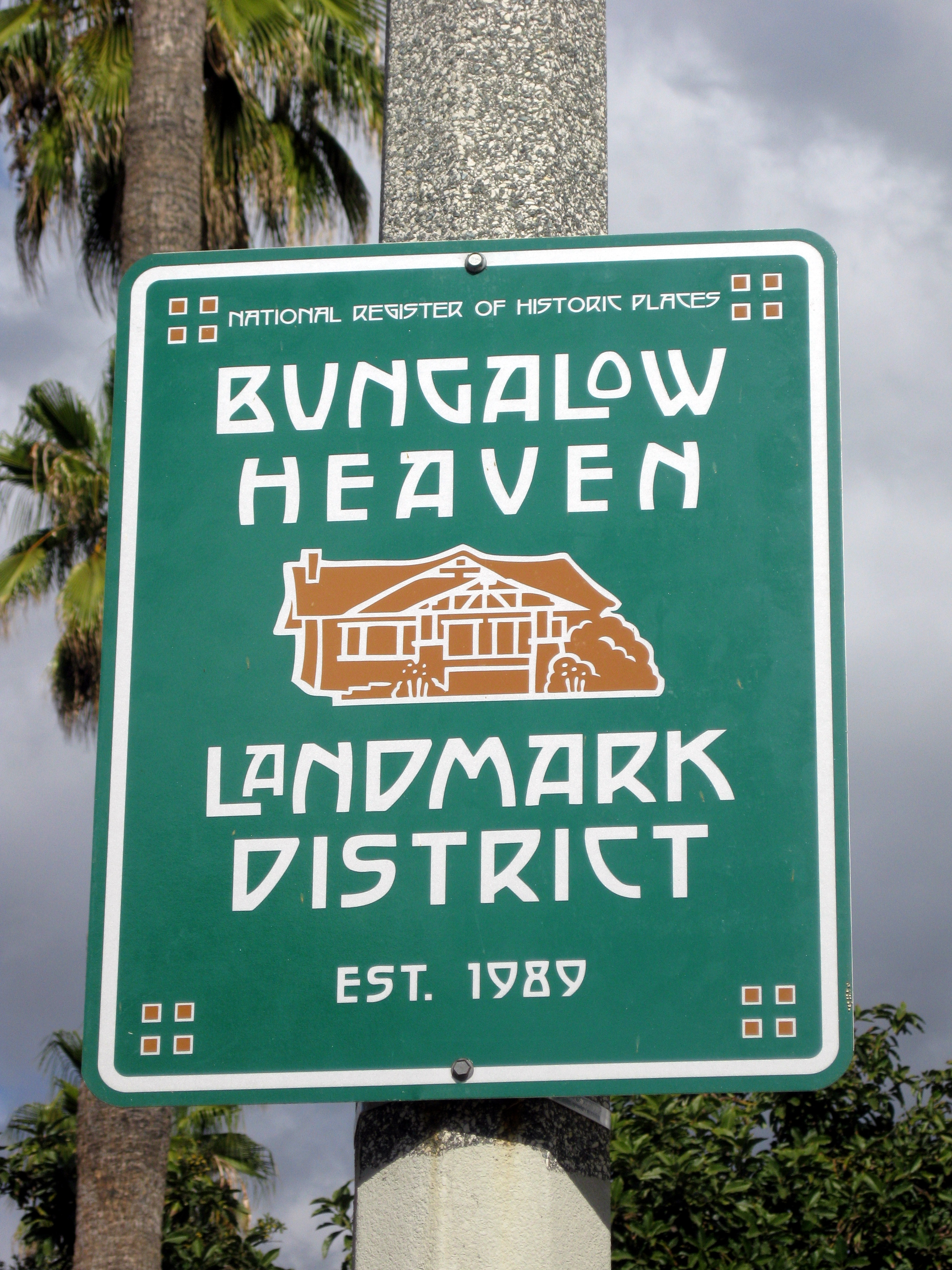
- Bungalow Heaven Landmark District

- Location within the Los Angeles metropolitan area Location within California Location within the United States
- Location: Roughly bounded by N. Mentor Ave., E. Orange Grove Blvd., E. Washington Blvd., N. Michigan & N. Chester Aves., Pasadena, California
- Area: 125 acres (51 ha)
- Built: 1904
- Architectural style: Late-19th and 20th-century revivals, bungalow/craftsman
- MPS: Residential Architecture of Pasadena: Influence of the Arts and Crafts Movement MPS
- NRHP reference No.: 08000260
- Added to NRHP: April 10, 2008

Bungalow Heaven is a neighborhood in Pasadena, California, named for the more than 800 small craftsman homes built there from 1900 to 1930, most of which still stand. Much of the area became a landmark district in 1989 and annual historic home tours have been conducted in Bungalow Heaven every year since then.

== Landmarks ==
The rough borders of the landmark district are Washington Boulevard to the north, Orange Grove Boulevard to the south, Mentor Avenue to the west, and N. Chester Avenue to the east. The entire neighborhood is typically extended to Lake Avenue to the west and Hill Avenue to the east.

All commercial development lies just outside the landmark area, on Lake Avenue and Washington Boulevard. McDonald Park is at the center of the neighborhood.

== Education ==
Bungalow Heaven is served by Longfellow and Jefferson Elementary Schools, Eliot Middle School, and Pasadena High School.

== Transportation ==
Bungalow Heaven is served by Metro Local lines 256 and 662, as well as Pasadena Transit routes 20, 31, and 32.

== See also ==
- Bungalow court, a style of multi-family housing developed in Pasadena in the 1910s
