= Triokinase/FMN cyclase =

Protein-coding gene in the species Homo sapiens

TKFC

Identifiers
- Aliases: TKFC, NET45, DAK, triokinase and FMN cyclase, TKFCD
- External IDs: OMIM: 615844; MGI: 2385084; GeneCards: TKFC
Enzyme activity
EC #	BRENDA	ExPASy	KEGG	MetaCyc
2.7.1.28	↗	↗	↗	↗
2.7.1.29	↗	↗	↗	↗
4.6.1.15	↗	↗	↗	↗

Gene location (Human)
Chr.	Chromosome 11 (human)
Band	11q12.2	Start	61,333,220 bp
Band	11q12.2	End	61,353,295 bp

Gene location (Mouse)
Chr.	Chromosome 19 (mouse)
Band	19|19 A	Start	10,565,155 bp
Band	19|19 A	End	10,583,018 bp
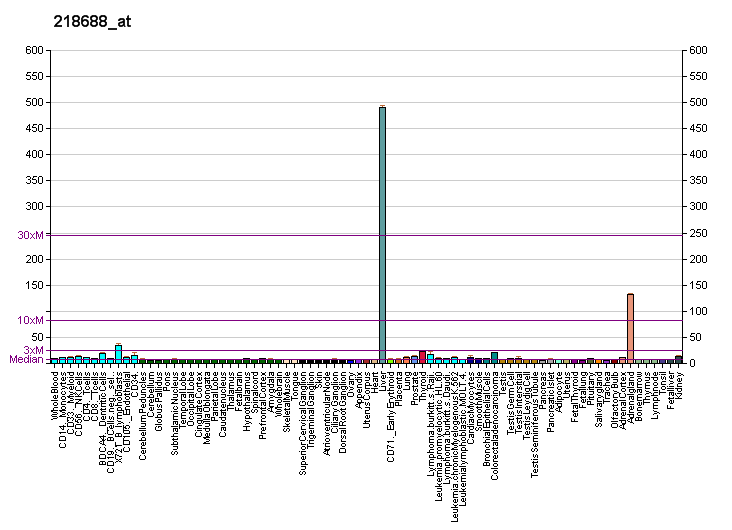
RNA expression pattern
Bgee	Human / Mouse (ortholog); Top expressed in: right adrenal cortex; left adrenal cortex; right lobe of liver; right uterine tube; right testis; left testis; body of pancreas; duodenum; right lobe of thyroid gland; mucosa of transverse colon / Top expressed in: spermatocyte; right kidney; yolk sac; proximal tubule; duodenum; jejunum; spermatid; seminiferous tubule; human kidney; liver; More reference expression data
BioGPS	More reference expression data
Gene ontology
Molecular function	transferase activity; nucleotide binding; metal ion binding; kinase activity; protein binding; glycerone kinase activity; catalytic activity; lyase activity; triokinase activity; FAD-AMP lyase (cyclizing) activity; ATP binding
Cellular component	cytosol; extracellular exosome; nucleus
Biological process	negative regulation of MDA-5 signaling pathway; regulation of innate immune response; phosphorylation; fructose catabolic process to hydroxyacetone phosphate and glyceraldehyde-3-phosphate; carbohydrate phosphorylation; cellular carbohydrate metabolic process; metabolism; innate immune response; glycerol metabolic process; glycerol catabolic process
Sources:Amigo / QuickGO
Orthologs
Databases	NCBI: entry; OMA: entry
Species	Human	Mouse
Entrez	26007	225913
Ensembl	ENSG00000149476	ENSMUSG00000034371
UniProt	Q3LXA3	Q8VC30
RefSeq (mRNA)	NM_015533; NM_001351976; NM_001351977; NM_001351978; NM_001351979 NM_001351980	NM_145496
RefSeq (protein)	NP_056348; NP_001338905; NP_001338906; NP_001338907; NP_001338908 NP_001338909	NP_663471
Location (UCSC)	Chr 11: 61.33 – 61.35 Mb	Chr 19: 10.57 – 10.58 Mb
PubMed search
- Wikidata
View/Edit Human	View/Edit Mouse

Triokinase/FMN cyclase is an enzyme that in humans is encoded by the TKFC gene (previously DAK). Triokinase/FMN cyclase represses the cellular antiviral response triggered by the RNA-sensor IFIH1.

== Function ==
This gene is a member of the family of dihydroxyacetone kinases, which have a protein structure distinct from other kinases. The product of this gene phosphorylates dihydroxyacetone, and also catalyzes the formation of riboflavin 4',5'-phosphate (aka cyclic FMN) from FAD. Several alternatively spliced transcript variants have been identified, but the full-length nature of only one has been determined.
