= Dak edition =

Dak edition, in India, is the edition of a newspaper published earlier than other editions in order to be distributed to mofussil areas (i.e. places outside of major metropolitan areas). Shashi Tharoor provides his description of 1960s Dak edition as "yesterday's news with today's date on it. Aggarwal states that it is the responsibility of the news editor to schedule the printing of the dak edition which he describes as meant for distant places as different from "city edition", which intended for the city in which it is printed. Naqvi states that there are many editions of a paper such as dak edition, city edition and late city edition. A dispatch appearing in Allen's Indian Mail (1851) uses the term describing it as very different from the morning edition.

== Etymology ==
Dak spelt dawk in Hobson-Jobson is an Anglo-Indian word, described as having been derived from Hindustani and Marathi dak meaning post. Handbook Of Advertising Media And Public Relations advises that press conferences should be scheduled early so that content would be available for the dak edition.
