= Dack =

Dack or variation, may refer to:

== People ==
=== Surname ===
- Bradley Dack (born 1993), English footballer
- Craig Dack, Australian motorcycle champion
- Gail Monroe Dack (1901–1976), U.S. bacteriologist
- Harry Dack (1877–1954), UK politician
- Jimmy Dack (born 1972), English footballer, coach and manager
- Vu Duc Minh Dack (born 1982), French karateka martial artist
- Walter MacMorris Dack (1852–1912), Canadian newspaper publisher

=== Given name ===
- Dack Rambo (1941–1994), U.S. actor

== Other uses ==
- A character from Gunsmoke
- Charlton and Dack, a municipality in Timiskaming, Ontario, Canada, formed in part from Dack Township
- to dack, to pants; see pantsing

== See also ==
- Dacks, or sweatpants
- DAQ (disambiguation)
- DAC (disambiguation)
- DAK (disambiguation)
