= List of reporting marks: D =

Note: Marks ending in U are for container owners; marks ending in X are not common carriers; marks ending in Z are for trailers without flanged wheels. All other marks are of common-carrier railroads.

== D ==
- DA - Dominion Atlantic Railway; Canadian Pacific Railway
- DACX - Darling and Company; VIP Tank Services
- DAFU - Dafra Lines, SA
- DAFX - United States Department of Defense (Troop Support and Aviation Material Readiness)
- DAFZ - Dafra Lines, SA
- DAIR - D&I Railroad
- DAKR - Dakota Rail
- DAKS - Dakota Short Line
- DAKX - DAK Americas, LLC
- DALT - Dallas Terminal Railway
- DALZ - D and A Leasing, Inc.
- DANX - Dana Railcare
- DAPX - Dairyland Power Cooperative
- DARU - Dart Container Line, Inc.
- DARZ - Dart Intermodal, Inc.
- DATU - Dart Container Line, Inc.
- DATX - DATX Associates
- DAVX - W. R. Grace and Company (Conn. Davison Chemical Division)
- DAWX - D.A. Walmsley and Company
- DAX - Diamond Shamrock Chemicals Company; Occidental Chemical Corporation
- DBCX - Badische Corporation; BASF Corporation
- DBGX - Dowdle Butane Gas Company
- DBSU - Donbar Steamship Company, Inc.
- DBUX - Canterra Energy, Ltd.; CIT Group/Capital Finance, Inc.
- DBWX - DB Western, Inc.
- DC - Delray Connecting Railroad
- DCAX - Tarmac Florida, Inc.
- DCBX - DeGussa Engineered Carbons, LLP
- DCCU - Dow Corning Corporation
- DCCX - McDonnell Douglas Corporation
- DCFX - PLM International, Inc.
- DCI - Des Moines and Central Iowa
- DCIX - Danella Construction Corporation
- DCLR - Delaware Coast Line Railroad
- DCLU - Dutch Container Leasing, B.V.
- DCLX - Procor Ltd.; Dow Chemical Canada, Inc.
- DCMX - Davidson Construction Materials, Inc.
- DCON - Detroit Connecting Railroad Company
- DCOU - Dow Corning Corporation
- DCPX - Dart Container Corporation of Pennsylvania
- DCR - Delmarva Central Railroad
- DCRR - Dubois County Railroad
- DCSU - Delta Conteneur Service
- DCTX - PLM International
- DD - Dover and Delaware River Railroad
- DDDX - Frontier Cooperative Company
- DDEX - Dupont Dow Elastomers, LLC
- DDNX - Didion, Inc.
- DEAX - Deacero, S.A. de C.V.
- DEBX - Ceres AG Products
- DEEX - Detroit Edison
- DEGX - Mississippi Power Company
- DEMX - Demeter, Inc.
- DEPX - Dependable Properties, Inc.
- DETX - Detroit Edison Company
- DFTX - DTE Transportation Services, Ltd.
- DGBY - Digby Truck Lines
- DGCX - Dakota Gasification Company
- DGHX - North American Chemical Company
- DGIX - D and G Enterprises, LLC
- DGNO - Dallas, Garland and Northeastern Railroad
- DGVR - Durbin and Greenbrier Valley Railroad
- DH - Delaware and Hudson Railway
- DHNY - Delaware and Hudson Railway
- DHPX - Degussa Corporation
- DHRU - Den Hartogh NV
- DICX - Pure Carbonic Company
- DIIU - Dart Intermodal, Inc.
- DIR - Duluth and Iron Range Railway
- DJBX - Gandy Dancer, Inc. (Donald J. Bertel)
- DJJX - The David J. Joseph Co.
- DJLX - The David J. Joseph Co.; CIT Group/Capital Finance, Inc.
- DJMX - Daniel John Marnell
- DJNX - The David J. Joseph Co.
- DJPX - The David J. Joseph Co.
- DJRX - The David J. Joseph Co.
- DJTX - The David J. Joseph Co.
- DKPX - Duke Power Company (scale test cars)
- DKS - Doniphan, Kensett and Searcy Railway; Union Pacific Railroad
- DKUX - Exxon Mobil Corporation
- DL - Delaware Lackawanna
- DLC - Drummond Lighterage
- DLCR - Delaware Coast Line Railroad
- DLCX - Diesel Locomotive Company
- DLFX - Diversified Lease Funding, Inc.
- DLGX - Lewis Grain Company
- DLKU - Deltank, Ltd.
- DLMX - Daylight Locomotives and Machine Works, Inc.
- DLNW - Denver, Laramie and North Western Railroad; Great Western Railway of Colorado
- DLPX - DeGussa Canada, Ltd.
- DLRX - GE Railcar Services Corporation
- DLSX - Diesel Supply Company, Inc.
- DLTX - Dale L. Thornborough
- DLVX - Thiokol Corporation
- DLW - Delaware, Lackawanna and Western Railroad; Erie Lackawanna Railway; Norfolk Southern
- DLWR - Depew, Lancaster and Western Railroad
- DLWX - D.L. and W., Inc.
- DM - Detroit and Mackinac Railway
- DME - Dakota, Minnesota and Eastern Railroad
- DMHX - Davenport Mammoet, LLC
- DMIR - Duluth, Missabe and Iron Range Railway
- DMIX - ADM Transportation
- DMLX - GE Railcar Services Corporation
- DMLZ - DML Containers
- DMM - Dansville and Mount Morris Railroad
- DMN - Duluth, Missabe and Northern Railway
- DMU - Des Moines Union Railway
- DMVW - Dakota, Missouri Valley and Western Railroad
- DNAX - Dana Railcare
- DNE - Duluth and Northeastern Railroad
- DOCX - Du Pont Canada, Inc.
- DODU - United States Department of Defense
- DODX - United States Department of Defense (Military Traffic Management Command)
- DODZ - United States Department of Defense
- DOEX - Doe Run Resources Corporation
- DOLX - Dolese Brothers Company
- DONX - Donnelly Commodities Company
- DOTX - United States Department of Transportation; Federal Railroad Administration
- DOWU - Dow Chemical Company
- DOWX - Dow Chemical Company
- DPCX - Blue Circle, Inc.
- DPDZ - Delaware and Hudson Railway
- DPGX - Tractech Systems
- DPIX - Dufour Petroleum, Inc.
- DPLX - Davenport Cement Company
- DQE - De Queen and Eastern Railroad
- DR - Dardanelle and Russellville Railroad
- DRAX - DRAYCUTT Corporation
- DRCX - Martin Marietta Corporation
- DRDX - The Duredo Company
- DREX - ProTrade Steel Company
- DRG - Denver and Rio Grande Railroad
- DRGW - Denver and Rio Grande Western Railroad; Southern Pacific Railroad; Union Pacific Railroad
- DRGX - Denver and Royal Gorge Railway
- DRHY - Durham Transport
- DRI - Davenport, Rock Island and North Western Railway
- DRIR - Denver Rock Island Railroad
- DRMX - Danbury Railway Museum
- DRR - Delaware and Raritan River Railroad
- DRR - Disneyland Railroad
- DRRV - Dover and Rockaway River Railroad
- DRSX - D.O.T. Rail Services, Inc.
- DRTU - Dart Intermodal, Inc.
- DRTZ - Dart Intermodal, Inc.
- DSBU - Ameribrom, Inc.
- DSCX - DIFCO, Inc.
- DSDX - Pullman Leasing Company
- DSEX - East Carbon Development Company
- DSIX - Dowell Schlumberger, Inc.
- DSLX - DeGussa Corporation
- DSLZ - Intermodal Services, Inc.
- DSRC - Dakota Southern Railway
- DSRR - Delta Southern Railroad
- DSRX - Downeast Scenic Railroad (and its parent organization, Downeast Rail Heritage Preservation Trust, Inc.)
- DSSA - Duluth, South Shore and Atlantic Railway
- DSSX - Detroit Salt Company, LLC
- DT - Decatur Junction Railway
- DTCX - DTE Transportation Services, Inc.
- DTEX - Dresser Transportation Equipment (Division of Dresser Industries)
- DTI - Detroit, Toledo and Ironton Railroad; Grand Trunk Western Railroad; Canadian National Railway
- DTIZ - Grand Trunk Western Railroad; Canadian National Railway
- DTLX - Delta Tank Line Company
- DTRR - Danbury Terminal Railroad; Housatonic Railroad
- DTS - Detroit and Toledo Shore Line Railroad; Grand Trunk Western Railroad; Canadian National Railway
- DTTX - TTX Corporation
- DTZZ - Direct Transit, Inc.
- DUCX - DuPont Canada, Inc.
- DUFX - Duffy and Sons, Inc.
- DUKX - Dupps Company
- DUPX - DuPont
- DUT - Denver Union Terminal Railway
- DUTC - Dallas Union Terminal
- DV - Delaware Valley Railway
- DVLX - Duval Corporation; Freeport-McRo-Ran Sulphur Company
- DVR - Devco Railway; Cape Breton Development Corporation (Coal Division); Sydney Coal Railway (its successor)
- DVRU - Dover, Ltd.
- DVS - Delta Valley and Southern Railway
- DVSZ - Delta Valley and Southern Railway
- DVTX - SULCOM, Inc.
- DW - Detroit and Western
- DWAU - Degussa Antwerpen, NV
- DWC - Duluth, Winnipeg and Pacific Railway; Canadian National Railway
- DWCX - David Witherspoon, Inc.
- DWML - Due West Motor Line
- DWP - Duluth, Winnipeg and Pacific Railway; Canadian National Railway
- DYLX - Ronald L. Boothman Remainder Trust; Transportation Equipment
- DYNX - Dyno Nobel, Inc.
- DYRX - Dynamic Rail Preservation Inc.
