= Defense Technical Information Center =

US Department of Defense repository for research and engineering information

- DTIC

Department overview
- Formed: June 1945
- Preceding agencies: Air Documents Research Center (ADRC); Air Documents Division (ADD); Central Air Documents Office (CADO)
- Headquarters: Fort Belvoir, Virginia
- Department executive: Dr. Silvana Rubino-Hallman, Acting Administrator of the Defense Technical Information Center
- Parent Department: United States Department of Defense
- Website: discover.dtic.mil

The Defense Technical Information Center (DTIC, /ˈdiːtɪk/) is the United States Department of Defense (DoD) repository for research and engineering information. DTIC's services are available to DoD personnel, federal government employees, federal contractors, and selected academic institutions. The general public can access unclassified information approved for public release through the DTIC website.

== History ==
DTIC traces its origins to the Air Documents Research Center (ADRC), formed in June 1945 as a joint effort of the US Air Force, US Navy, and the United Kingdom's Royal Air Force. Based in London, the ADRC was established to build a single collection of captured German aeronautical research. Its initial task was to sort the documents into three groups: those that would assist the war in the Pacific theater, those of immediate intelligence interest to American or British forces, and those of interest for future research.

After the war ended in 1945, the ADRC moved to Wright Field in Dayton, Ohio, and was renamed the Air Documents Division (ADD). In 1948, the secretaries of the Navy and Air Force redesignated ADD as the Central Air Documents Office (CADO), transferring to it the collection of captured documents and broadening its mission to include collecting, processing, and disseminating technical information.

In 1951, the organization was renamed the Armed Services Technical Information Agency (ASTIA) to "provide an integrated program of scientific and technical services for the Department of Defense and its contractors". A branch office was opened in the Library of Congress in Washington as part of this reorganization. One of ASTIA's principal projects was developing library catalog systems to organize its growing holdings, which led to the adoption of the Uniterm indexing system in the early 1950s.

In 1963, the organization was again restructured and became the Defense Documentation Center for Science and Technical Information (DDC), placed under the Defense Supply Agency (DSA). The DDC relocated to Cameron Station, Alexandria, Virginia. It was renamed the Defense Technical Information Center in 1969. In 1995, DTIC moved to the Andrew T. McNamara Headquarters Complex at Fort Belvoir, Virginia, as part of the reformed Defense Logistics Agency.

In August 2025, the Under Secretary of Defense for Research and Engineering, Emil Michael, directed a reduction of DTIC's civilian staff from 154 to 40. A memorandum titled "Rationalization and Transformation of the Defense Technical Information Center" stated that DTIC's organizational model and information platform were not suited to current needs, including the integration of artificial intelligence and alignment with other defense data systems. The restructuring was projected to save more than $25 million per year.

In late July or early August 2026 DTIC public search was taken offline and the search bar removed from their website, with a message posted stating "DTIC Public Search is offline while we enhance the capability. It will be back online soon." Furthermore in late august or early September 2026 DTIC public access was removed, with attempting to load any of the files they had hosted producing an error stating "We'll be back shortly! We are currently performing scheduled maintenance to improve our services. We apologize for any inconvenience. Thank you for your patience." As of early November 2026 both of these remain offline with no public timeline for their restoration.

== Products and services ==
=== DTIC public website ===
DTIC's public website, discover.dtic.mil, provides access to unclassified information approved for public release.

=== R&E Gateway ===
The R&E Gateway is the DoD's online portal for research, development, testing, and evaluation (RDT&E) information. It holds over 4.7 million science and technology records, including scientific and technical reports, project summaries, DoD-funded journal articles, budget exhibits, grant awards, and international agreements.

=== DTIC Online Classified ===
DTIC Online Classified, accessible through the Secure Internet Protocol Routing Network (SIPRNet), provides access to DTIC's full collection of technical reports, covering unclassified unlimited, unclassified limited, and classified (up to SECRET) materials. Registered users can also access other SIPRNet-hosted sites, including DoDTechipedia Classified.

=== Information Analysis Centers ===
The DoD Information Analysis Centers (DoDIAC) provide research and analysis services drawing on government, industry, and academic expertise. Three Basic Centers of Operation (BCOs) deliver these services: Cyber-Security and Information Systems, Defense Systems, and Homeland Defense and Security. Each BCO draws on a network of subject-matter experts, including engineers, scientists, retired senior military officers, academic researchers, and industry specialists, to address scientific and technical questions for DoD clients.

== See also ==
- Cyber Security and Information Systems Information Analysis Center (CSISIAC)
- National Technical Information Service
- Office of Scientific and Technical Information
