= Laufey discography =

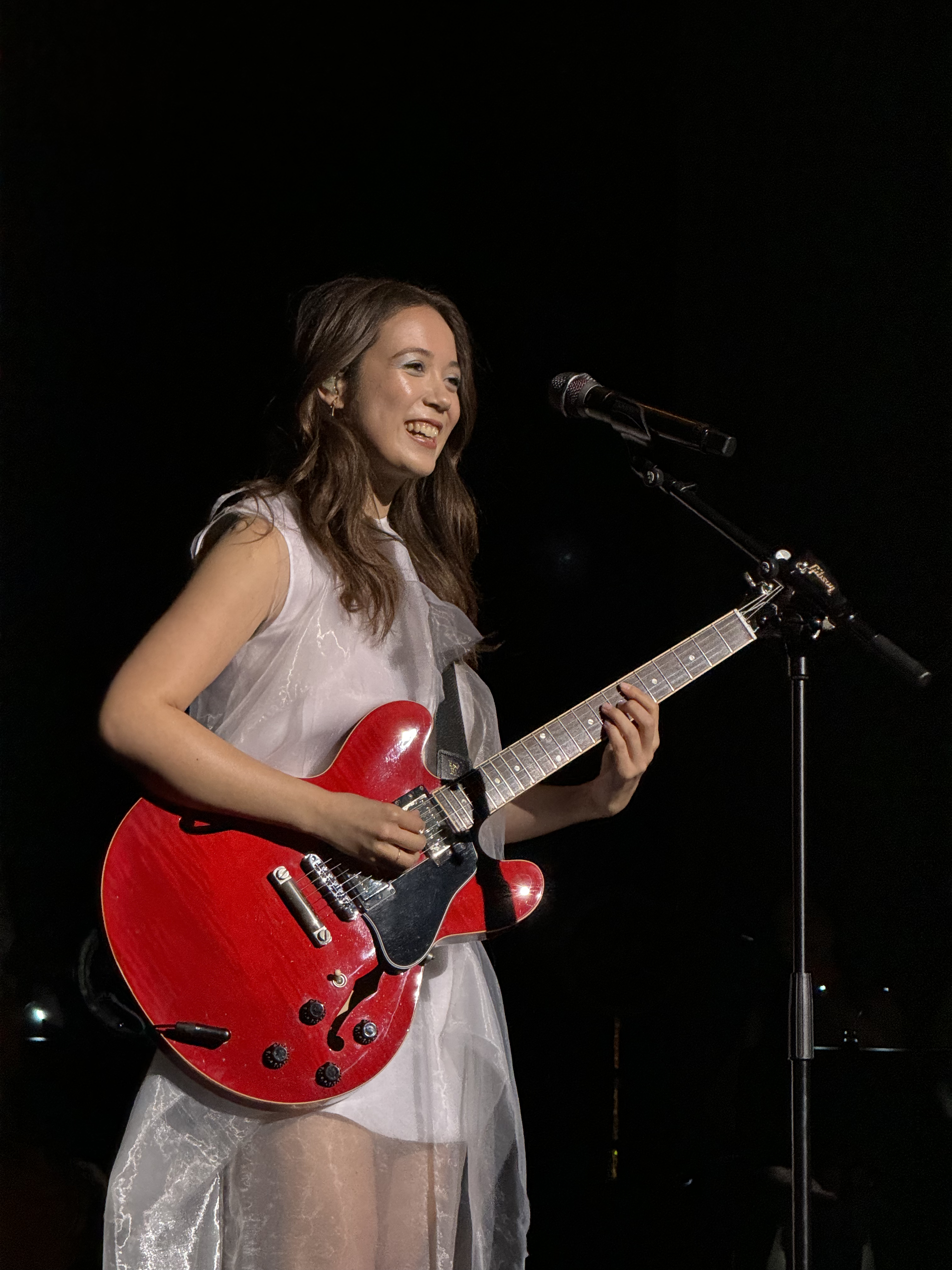
- Laufey performing in 2024
- Studio albums: 3
- Live albums: 3
- Reissue albums: 2
- Extended plays: 7
- Singles: 23
- Promotional singles: 15
- Music videos: 18

The discography of Icelandic singer-songwriter Laufey consists of three studio albums, three live albums, two reissue albums, seven extended plays, 23 singles, 15 promotional singles, and a number of other appearances. With her debut EP, Typical of Me (2021), and her debut album, Everything I Know About Love (2022), Laufey reached the top ten on the US Jazz Albums and UK Jazz & Blues Albums charts. The latter also reached the top ten in her native country. The following year, she released her first live album, A Night at the Symphony with the Iceland Symphony Orchestra, which was a top-five success in Iceland and on the US Classical Albums chart.

Laufey achieved a career breakthrough with her second studio album, Bewitched (2023), which reached the top twenty in seven countries, topped several jazz album charts around the world, and featured the moderately successful single "From the Start". The album's reissue, Bewitched: The Goddess Edition, was released the following year and debuted at number one in Iceland, becoming Laufey's first number-one album in her native country. Also in 2024, she released her second live album accompanied by the corresponding concert film, A Night at the Symphony: Hollywood Bowl with the Los Angeles Philharmonic, earning her fifth top-ten entry there.

Between 2023 and 2025, her recording of "Winter Wonderland" became the highest-charting version of the song in the Core Anglosphere countries, excluding the United States, and marked her first entry on the Billboard Global 200. This single is included on A Big Bold Beautiful Journey and on the digital reissues of her Christmas EP, A Very Laufey Holiday: The Santa Baby Edition and A Very Laufey Holiday: The Santa Claus Is Comin' To Town Edition, which featured the title tracks and "Christmas Magic", the original theme from the film Red One and Laufey's first entry on the Billboard Hot 100. The aforementioned EP reached the top fifty on the Canadian Albums chart and appeared on all American charts for which it was eligible.

Three years after her debut album, Laufey released A Matter of Time (2025), which became her second number-one album in Iceland and marked her first top-five debut in seven foreign countries. All four singles from this third studio album, as well as two other songs from it, reached the top forty in her native country. The lead single, "Silver Lining", also appeared on the year-end chart. Additionally, "Lover Girl" entered the North American charts and earned Laufey her seventh RIAA-certified single. In 2026, she released a reissue of the album and her third live album. The latter was recorded at Madison Square Garden during the A Matter of Time Tour and debuted on the Australian and British charts.

== Albums ==
=== Studio albums ===
List of studio albums, with selected details, chart positions, units and certifications
Title	Details	Peak chart positions										Units	Certifications
Title	Details	ICE	AUS	CAN	GER	IRE	NLD	NZ	POR	UK	US	Units	Certifications
Everything I Know About Love	Released: 26 August 2022 (Note: Re-released digitally on 14 October 2022, with three bonus tracks.); Label: AWAL; Formats: Streaming, DL, LP, CD	6	—	—	— (Note: Everything I Know About Love did not enter the Deutsche Top 100 Albums chart and its component charts, but it peaked at number 12 on the Deutsche Top 20 Jazz Albums chart.)	—	—	—	—	— (Note: Everything I Know About Love did not enter the UK Albums Chart and its component charts, but it peaked at number 5 on the UK Jazz & Blues Albums Chart.)	— (Note: Everything I Know About Love did not enter the Billboard 200, but it peaked at number 50 on the Top Album Sales chart and at number 3 on the Jazz Albums chart.)	ICE: 1,917	RIAA: Gold; RMNZ: Gold
Bewitched	Released: 8 September 2023; Label: AWAL; Formats: Streaming, DL, LP, CD, CT	2	6	38	45	67	15	13	60	13	18	ICE: 3,009; UK: 64,018; US: 950,000	FHF: Gold; BPI: Gold; RIAA: Platinum; RMNZ: Platinum
A Matter of Time	Released: 22 August 2025 (Note: Re-released digitally on 24 August 2025, with the hidden track from the physical editions.); Label: AWAL; Formats: Streaming, DL, LP+7", CD, CT, BS	1	2	7	11	13	2	3	7	3	4	ICE: 1,170; UK: 72,540; US: 99,000	BPI: Silver
"—" denotes a recording that did not chart or was not released in that territory.

=== Live albums ===
List of live albums, with selected details and chart positions
Title	Details	Peak chart positions									
Title	Details	ICE	AUS	NLD	POR	SCO	UK	US	US Class.	US Indie	US Jazz
A Night at the Symphony (with the Iceland Symphony Orchestra)	Released: 2 March 2023 (Note: Released digitally along with performance videos of each track available on YouTube. Released physically as part of Record Store Day on 20 April 2024, with a total of 4,200 copies pressed.); Label: AWAL; Formats: Streaming, DL, 2×LP	4	— (Note: A Night at the Symphony did not enter the ARIA Top 50 Albums chart, but it peaked at number 4 on the ARIA Top 20 Vinyl Albums chart.)	—	—	31	— (Note: A Night at the Symphony did not enter the UK Albums Chart, but it peaked at number 27 on the UK Vinyl Albums Chart.)	—	2	—	8
A Night at the Symphony: Hollywood Bowl (with the Los Angeles Philharmonic)	Released: 6 December 2024 (Note: Released digitally on the day of the film's premiere in cinemas and IMAX, its tracklist corresponds to set two of the concert. Released physically as part of Record Store Day on 12 April 2025, with a total of 15,000 copies pressed.); Label: AWAL; Formats: Streaming, DL, 2×LP, BD	6	— (Note: A Night at the Symphony: Hollywood Bowl did not enter the ARIA Top 50 Albums chart, but it peaked at number 4 on the ARIA Top 10 Vinyl Albums chart.)	89	147	13	— (Note: A Night at the Symphony: Hollywood Bowl did not enter the UK Albums Chart, but it peaked at number 13 on the UK Vinyl Albums Chart.)	169	1	25	1
A Matter of Time: Live at Madison Square Garden	Released: 18 April 2026 (Note: Released physically as part of Record Store Day on 18 April 2026, with a total of 17,000 copies pressed.); Label: AWAL; Format: 2×LP	*	13	32	—	6	94	— (Note: A Matter of Time: Live at Madison Square Garden did not enter the Billboard 200, but it peaked at number 12 on the Top Album Sales chart.)	—	— (Note: A Matter of Time: Live at Madison Square Garden did not enter the Independent Albums chart, but it peaked at number 6 on the Indie Store Album Sales chart.)	4
"—" denotes a recording that did not chart or was not released in that territory. "*" denotes that the chart is discontinued.

=== Reissue albums ===
List of reissue albums, with selected details, chart positions, units and certifications
Title	Details	Peak chart positions					Units	Certifications
Title	Details	ICE	AUS	NLD	NZ	POR	Units	Certifications
Bewitched: The Goddess Edition	Released: 26 April 2024; Label: AWAL; Formats: Streaming, DL, 2×LP, CD, CT, BS	1	— (Note: Bewitched and Bewitched: The Goddess Edition were combined on the ARIA Top 50 Albums chart.)	15	13	60	ICE: 634	RMNZ: Gold
A Matter of Time: The Final Hour	Released: 10 April 2026; Label: AWAL; Formats: Streaming, DL, 2×LP, CD, CT, BS	*	2	15	— (Note: A Matter of Time and A Matter of Time: The Final Hour were combined on the Aotearoa Top 40 Albums chart.)	119		
"—" denotes a recording that did not chart or was not released in that territory. "*" denotes that the chart is discontinued.

== Extended plays ==
=== Studio extended plays ===
List of studio extended plays, with selected details and chart positions
Title	Details	Peak chart positions									
Title	Details	ICE	AUS	CAN	SCO	UK	UK Indie	UK Jazz	US	US Indie	US Jazz
Typical of Me	Released: 30 April 2021; Label: AWAL (Note: Originally self-published by Laufey and later re-released through AWAL.); Formats: Streaming, DL, 12"	12	—	—	86	—	42	7	— (Note: Typical of Me did not enter the Billboard 200, but it peaked at number 72 on the Top Album Sales chart.)	—	2
A Very Laufey Holiday! (Note: Subtitled The Santa Baby Edition when digitally reissued on 1 November 2024. Subtitled The Winter Wonderland Edition and The Christmas Waltz Edition on the 7-inch vinyls that originally comprised the expandable box set released on 6 December 2024. Subtitled The Santa Claus Is Comin' To Town Edition when digitally reissued on 5 November 2025 and on the additional 7-inch vinyl released on 5 December 2025.)	Released: 11 November 2022 (Note: Originally released as a two-track EP containing "The Christmas Waltz" and "Love to Keep Me Warm", it was re-released: 3 November 2023 to add "Christmas Dreaming"; 20 December 2023 to add "Winter Wonderland"; 1 November 2024 to add "Santa Baby"; 7 November 2024 to add "Christmas Magic" exclusively on Amazon Music; 5 November 2025 to add "Santa Claus Is Comin' to Town" and "Christmas Magic" non-exclusively.); Label: AWAL; Formats: Streaming, DL, 7" box set	23	95	47	—	96	—	—	57	3	5
Christmas with You (with Norah Jones) (Note: Released through Jones' record label, the EP consists of "Have Yourself a Merry Little Christmas" and "Better Than Snow".)	Released: 10 November 2023; Label: Capitol, Blue Note; Formats: Streaming, DL, 7"	—	—	—	—	—	—	—	—	—	—
"—" denotes a recording that did not chart or was not released in that territory.

=== Live extended plays ===
List of live extended plays, with selected details and chart positions
Title	Details	Peak chart positions
Title	Details	FRA Jazz
The Reykjavík Sessions (Note: A six-track EP containing live versions of all the singles from Everything I Know About Love, plus a live version of "Let You Break My Heart Again".)	Released: 22 September 2022; Label: AWAL; Formats: Streaming, DL	35
Amazon Music Songline (Note: A seven-track EP recorded live exclusively for Amazon Music. The accompanying concert film is available on YouTube.)	Released: 26 September 2025; Label: AWAL; Formats: Streaming, DL	—
"—" denotes a recording that did not chart or was not released in that territory.

=== Remix extended plays ===
List of remix extended plays, with selected details (Note: Except on Apple Music, the remix extended plays are listed on music streaming services under the name of the mascot character Mei Mei the Bunny.)
Title	Details
Laufey Lofi Collection (Note: A four-track EP containing lo-fi versions of "From the Start", "Falling Behind", "I Wish You Love" and "Valentine".)	Released: 9 August 2024; Label: AWAL; Formats: Streaming, DL
A Very Mei Mei Holiday! (Note: A two-track EP containing sped-up versions of "Santa Baby" and "Winter Wonderland".)	Released: 27 November 2024; Label: AWAL; Formats: Streaming, DL

== Singles ==
=== As lead artist ===
List of singles as lead artist, with release year, selected chart positions, certifications, and associated album
Title	Year	Peak chart positions										Certifications	Album
Title	Year	ICE	AUS	CAN	IRE	NLD	NZ	SWI	UK	US	WW	Certifications	Album
"Best Friend"	2021	—	—	—	—	—	—	—	—	—	—		Typical of Me
"Magnolia"	2021	—	—	—	—	—	—	—	—	—	—		Typical of Me
"Let You Break My Heart Again" (with the Philharmonia Orchestra)	2021	—	—	—	—	—	—	—	—	—	—	ARIA: Gold; RIAA: Platinum; RMNZ: Gold	Non-album single
"Love to Keep Me Warm" (with Dodie)	2021	—	—	—	—	—	—	—	—	—	—		A Very Laufey Holiday!
"Valentine" (Note: The track was not included on the first pressings of the Everything I Know About Love LP. Its heart-shaped vinyl releases feature either a live version recorded at the Harpa Concert Hall in Reykjavík or the later single "Lover Girl" as the B-side.)	2022	—	—	—	—	—	—	—	— (Note: "Valentine" did not enter the UK Singles Chart, but it peaked at number 3 on the UK Singles Sales Chart.)	—	—	ARIA: Gold; RIAA: Platinum; RMNZ: Gold	Everything I Know About Love
"Everything I Know About Love"	2022	40	—	—	—	—	—	—	—	—	—		Everything I Know About Love
"Fragile"	2022	—	—	—	—	—	—	—	—	—	—		Everything I Know About Love
"The Christmas Waltz" (Note: The track was released on 7-inch vinyl in 2024, with the earlier standalone single "Love to Keep Me Warm" as the B-side.)	2022	—	—	—	—	—	—	—	— (Note: "The Christmas Waltz" did not enter the UK Singles Chart, but it peaked at number 72 on the UK Singles Sales Chart.)	—	—		A Very Laufey Holiday!
"From the Start" (Note: The track was released on 7-inch vinyl exclusively at Urban Outfitters in 2024, with its live from home version as the B-side.)	2023	19	—	83	—	—	— (Note: "From the Start" did not enter the Aotearoa Top 40 Singles chart, but it peaked at number 8 on the Aotearoa Hot 40 Singles chart.)	—	92	— (Note: "From the Start" did not enter the Billboard Hot 100, but it peaked at number 1 on the Bubbling Under Hot 100 chart.)	—	ARIA: Platinum; BPI: Gold; MC: Platinum; RIAA: 3× Platinum; RMNZ: Platinum	Bewitched
"Bewitched"	2023	—	—	—	—	—	—	—	—	—	—		Bewitched
"A Night to Remember" (with Beabadoobee)	2023	—	—	—	—	—	— (Note: "A Night to Remember" did not enter the Aotearoa Top 40 Singles chart, but it peaked at number 3 on the Aotearoa Hot 40 Singles chart.)	—	84	— (Note: "A Night to Remember" did not enter the Billboard Hot 100, but it peaked at number 17 on the Bubbling Under Hot 100 chart and at number 25 on the Hot Rock & Alternative Songs chart.)	—		Non-album single
"Winter Wonderland" (Note: The track was initially released as a standalone single for the 2023 edition of Spotify Singles Holiday and was later included on A Big Bold Beautiful Journey (2025). Its 7-inch vinyl released in 2024 features "Christmas Dreaming" as the B-side.)	2023	—	28	55	7	47	26	59	18	— (Note: "Winter Wonderland" did not enter the Billboard Hot 100, but it peaked at number 2 on the Bubbling Under Hot 100 chart.)	70	BPI: Silver; RIAA: Gold	A Very Laufey Holiday!
"Goddess"	2024	26	—	—	—	—	— (Note: "Goddess" did not enter the Aotearoa Top 40 Singles chart, but it peaked at number 12 on the Aotearoa Hot 40 Singles chart.)	—	—	—	—		Bewitched: The Goddess Edition
"Santa Baby"	2024	—	65	62	37	— (Note: "Santa Baby" did not enter the Dutch Single Top 100 chart, but it peaked at number 21 on the Dutch Single Tip 30 chart.)	— (Note: "Santa Baby" did not enter the Aotearoa Top 40 Singles chart, but it peaked at number 4 on the Aotearoa Hot 40 Singles chart.)	—	35	89	128		A Very Laufey Holiday!
"Christmas Magic" (Note: The track was initially released for Red One as an Amazon Music Original in digital formats and on an exclusive single-sided 7-inch vinyl.)	2024	—	—	—	99	—	—	—	13	56	80		A Very Laufey Holiday!
"Silver Lining"	2025	25	—	—	—	—	— (Note: "Silver Lining" did not enter the Aotearoa Top 40 Singles chart, but it peaked at number 13 on the Aotearoa Hot 40 Singles chart.)	—	—	—	—		A Matter of Time
"Tough Luck"	2025	36	—	—	—	—	— (Note: "Tough Luck" did not enter the Aotearoa Top 40 Singles chart, but it peaked at number 11 on the Aotearoa Hot 40 Singles chart.)	—	—	—	—		A Matter of Time
"Lover Girl"	2025	11	—	90	—	—	— (Note: "Lover Girl" did not enter the Aotearoa Top 40 Singles chart, but it peaked at number 25 on the Aotearoa Hot 40 Singles chart.)	—	—	91	—	RIAA: Gold; RMNZ: Gold	A Matter of Time
"Snow White"	2025	18	—	—	—	—	— (Note: "Snow White" did not enter the Aotearoa Top 40 Singles chart, but it peaked at number 28 on the Aotearoa Hot 40 Singles chart.)	—	—	— (Note: "Snow White" did not enter the Billboard Hot 100 or its extension, but it peaked at number 20 on the Hot Rock & Alternative Songs chart.)	—		A Matter of Time
"Santa Claus Is Comin' to Town" (Note: The track was released digitally and on 7-inch vinyl in the same year, with the earlier single "Santa Baby" as the B-side.)	2025	29	—	—	—	— (Note: "Santa Claus Is Comin' to Town" did not enter the Dutch Single Top 100 chart, but it peaked at number 24 on the Dutch Single Tip 30 chart.)	—	—	— (Note: "Santa Claus Is Comin' to Town" did not enter the UK Singles Chart, but it peaked at number 19 on the UK Singles Sales Chart.)	—	—		A Very Laufey Holiday!
"How I Get"	2026	—	—	—	—	—	— (Note: "How I Get" did not enter the Aotearoa Top 40 Singles chart, but it peaked at number 29 on the Aotearoa Hot 40 Singles chart.)	—	—	— (Note: "How I Get" did not enter the Billboard Hot 100 or its extension, but it peaked at number 35 on the Hot Rock & Alternative Songs chart.)	—		A Matter of Time: The Final Hour
"Madwoman"	2026	—	—	—	—	—	— (Note: "Madwoman" did not enter the Aotearoa Top 40 Singles chart, but it peaked at number 14 on the Aotearoa Hot 40 Singles chart.)	—	— (Note: "Madwoman" did not enter the UK Singles Chart, but it peaked at number 90 on the UK Singles Sales Chart.)	—	—		A Matter of Time: The Final Hour
"—" denotes a recording that did not chart or was not released in that territory.

=== As featured artist ===
List of singles as featured artist, with release year and associated album
Title	Year	Album
"The Longest Goodbye" (Role Model featuring Laufey)	2025	Non-album single

=== Promotional singles ===
List of promotional singles, with release year, certifications, and associated album
Title	Year	Certifications	Album
"Street by Street"	2020		Typical of Me
"Someone New"	2020		Typical of Me
"Love Flew Away" (with Adam Melchor)	2021		Non-album single
"Dear Soulmate"	2022		Everything I Know About Love
"Falling Behind"	2022	ARIA: Gold; BPI: Silver; RIAA: Platinum; RMNZ: Platinum	Everything I Know About Love
"Ain't Christmas" (with Alexander 23)	2022		Non-album single
"Valentine" (Live with the Iceland Symphony Orchestra)	2023		A Night at the Symphony
"Promise"	2023	RIAA: Platinum; RMNZ: Gold	Bewitched
"California and Me" (with the Philharmonia Orchestra)	2023		Bewitched
"Bewitched" (Rework with Víkingur Ólafsson)	2024		Non-album single
"Where or When"	2024		Bose x NME: C24
"Dreamer" (Live with the Los Angeles Philharmonic)	2024		A Night at the Symphony: Hollywood Bowl
"Letter to My 13 Year Old Self" (Re-recording with Barbra Streisand)	2025		The Secret of Life: Partners, Volume Two
"Blue in Green" (Note: The track was released as an Amazon Music Original in digital formats to promote the eponymous Lexus RZ.)	2026		Non-album single
"Have Yourself a Merry Little Christmas" (with Peanuts)	2026		Snoopy Presents: 12 Days of Snoopy

== Other charted songs ==
List of other charted songs, with release year, chart positions, and associated album
Title	Year	Peak chart positions		Album
Title	Year	ICE	NZ Hot	Album
"This Is How It Feels" (with D4vd)	2023	—	31	Petals to Thorns
"Dreamer"	2023	—	26	Bewitched
"Second Best"	2023	—	28	Bewitched
"Haunted"	2023	—	32	Bewitched
"Lovesick"	2023	—	21	Bewitched
"Bored"	2024	—	13	Bewitched: The Goddess Edition
"Clockwork"	2025	38	22	A Matter of Time
"Castle in Hollywood"	2025	—	26	A Matter of Time
"Forget-Me-Not"	2025	9	24	A Matter of Time
"Mr. Eclectic" (Note: The track was later included on The Devil Wears Prada 2 (2026).)	2025	—	23	A Matter of Time
"—" denotes a recording that did not chart.

== Other appearances ==
List of other appearances, with release year, other performing artist, and associated album
Title	Year	Other artist	Album
"Meiri Snjó"	2012	—N/a	Jólastjarnan
"Track 9" (Note: Appearance as a cellist.)	2021	Alexander 23	Oh No, Not Again!
"Internet Crush"	2023	Jeremy Zucker	Is Nothing Sacred?
"I Wish"	2023	Reneé Rapp	Snow Angel
"No One Knows"	2023	Stephen Sanchez	Angel Face
"The Risk" (Note: An instrumental version of the track is also included on the soundtrack.)	2025	—N/a	A Big Bold Beautiful Journey
"But Beautiful"	2025	—N/a	A Big Bold Beautiful Journey
"Let's Dream in the Moonlight" (Take 1)	2025	—N/a	A Big Bold Beautiful Journey

== Music videos ==
List of music videos, with release year, other performing artist and director
Title	Year	Other artist	Director	Ref.
"Best Friend"	2021	—N/a	Blythe Thomas	
"Magnolia"	2021	—N/a	Abby Christina Teodori	
"Let You Break My Heart Again"	2021	Philharmonia Orchestra	Nina Kramer	
"Love to Keep Me Warm"	2022	Dodie	Abby Christina Teodori	
"Everything I Know About Love"	2022	—N/a	Tess Lafia	
"Fragile"	2022	—N/a	Erlendur Sveinsson	
"Bewitched"	2023	—N/a	Lewis Cater	
"From the Start"	2023	—N/a	Jason Lester	
"From the Start" (Sped Up)	2023	—N/a	Jason Lester	
"A Night to Remember"	2023	Beabadoobee	Jake Erland	
"Goddess"	2024	—N/a	Celine Song	
"Santa Baby"	2024	—N/a	Jason Lester	
"Silver Lining"	2025	—N/a	Jason Lester	
"The Longest Goodbye"	2025	Role Model	Neema Sadeghi	
"Lover Girl"	2025	—N/a	Junia Lin	
"Snow White"	2025	—N/a	Junia Lin	
"Santa Claus Is Comin' to Town"	2025	—N/a	Jennifer Kidd	
"Madwoman"	2026	—N/a	Warren Fu	
