= A Night at the Symphony: Hollywood Bowl =

2024 film by Laufey

- Directed by: Sam Wrench
- Produced by: Max Gredinger; Bianca Bhagat; Devin Dehaven; Kyle Heller; Michael Schneider; Jessica Roulston; Connor Malbeuf
- Starring: Laufey
- Production company: Veeps Studio
- Distributed by: Trafalgar Releasing
- Release date: December 6, 2024
- Country: United States
- Language: English

A Night at the Symphony: Hollywood Bowl is a 2024 concert movie filmed from Icelandic singer-songwriter Laufey's Bewitched Tour August 7 show at the Hollywood Bowl. There, she performed alongside the Los Angeles Philharmonic conducted by Thomas Wilkins. The film presents a majority of the songs played at the show broken up by behind-the-scenes clips where Laufey discusses her upbringing and musical journey.

The film was directed by Sam Wrench, produced by Veeps Studios, and distributed to cinemas by Trafalgar Releasing. Laufey's sister, Junia Lin Jonsdottir, served as the film's creative director.

An official announcement for the film was released on October 23. The film was then shown in theaters worldwide starting on December 6, 2024, with IMAX showings on December 6 and 8 in the United States. In Southeast Asia, the film premiered in Indonesia, Malaysia, the Philippines, Singapore, and Thailand. It premiered on Veeps on December 29.

== Background ==
Growing up, Laufey was surrounded by classical music. Her mother is a violinist for the Iceland Symphony Orchestra, and from a young age, she began studying and training to be a musician. After spending her youth in Reykjavík, she moved to Boston to attend the Berklee College of Music where she practiced jazz in addition to classical.

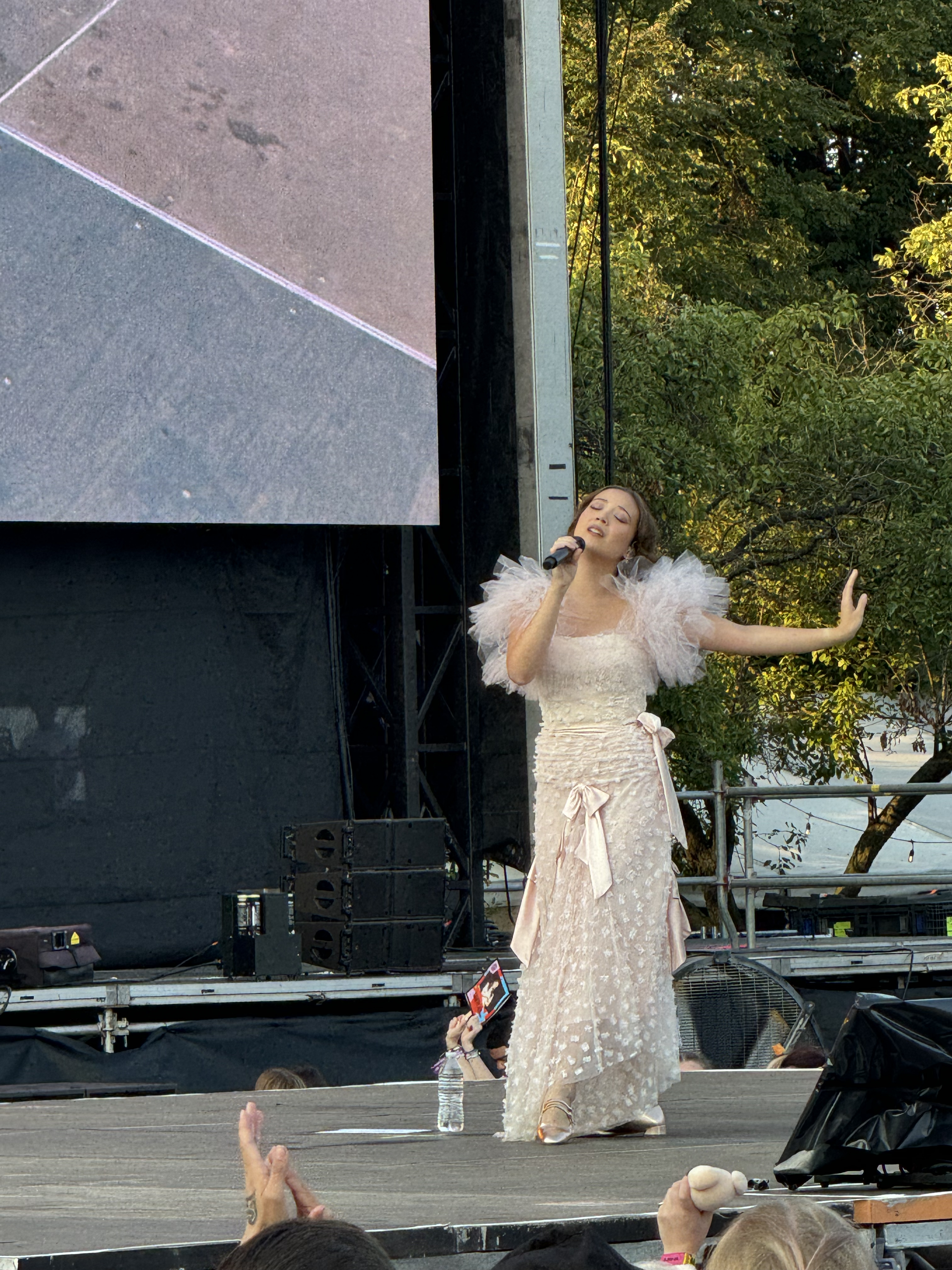
Laufey's Lollapalooza appearance in August 2024

As a college student, Laufey released her very first song "Street by Street" in 2020. Henceforth, through the COVID-19 pandemic, Laufey began to attract viral attention on TikTok and other social media platforms for her "unique sound and jazz-pop-infused songs." Her early projects, such as Typical of Me and Everything I Know About Love, garnered attention on the internet and landed on several music charts for jazz and pop from 2021 to 2023.

On September 8, 2023, Laufey released her second studio album, Bewitched, and announced the Bewitched Tour for 2023–2024 shortly after. In 2024, Laufey released Bewitched: The Goddess Edition featuring three new songs and went on to win the Grammy for Best Traditional Pop Vocal Album for the standard version of Bewitched.

Prior to her show at the Hollywood Bowl in August 2023, Laufey had performed and recorded live with orchestras before, such as her Lollapalooza set with the Chicago Philharmonic. In 2023, Laufey released her first live album, accompanied with a concert video, similarly titled A Night at the Symphony; it had been recorded during a performance at Harpa Concert Hall in Reykjavík with the Iceland Symphony Orchestra.

== Production ==
=== Concert ===
For much of her life, Laufey revered the music of Ella Fitzgerald and dreamed of someday playing the Hollywood Bowl. On August 7, 2024, Laufey performed with the Los Angeles Philharmonic at the Hollywood Bowl at a sold-out showing during her Bewitched Tour. (The tour stop had sold out "instantaneously" after tickets were made available, and resale tickets "were going for such a premium.") It was Laufey's first time playing the venue; there, she played 11 songs on her own and 15 with the orchestra's backing. Many critics called the performance a significant achievement in Laufey's budding career.

In Variety, Laufey said a concert movie "was one of those things that of course I always wanted to do, but I felt like I had to achieve a certain level to be able to do a concert film, and I definitely didn't think I'd get there so soon." Although Laufey had performed for live audiences for several years before, she found herself "on edge" in the presence of both the Los Angeles Philharmonic paired with the approximately 17,000 concert-goers she was performing for: "There's nothing really rehearsed about it. Like, I've never played for that many people before... [Wrench] really got my natural reaction to that during the whole concert, whether it was a little nerves in the beginning to sheer excitement and joy in the later parts." She also stated that she surprisingly wasn't very fazed by the newfound presence of rolling cameras and that the shooting of the concert movie helped her gain confidence in that regard.

=== Collaboration with Wrench ===
Laufey knew of Wrench from his previous work with Taylor Swift's 2023 concert movie, Taylor Swift: The Eras Tour; Laufey, a fan of Swift herself, believed Wrench to be a good fit for her own film: "I really just needed someone that I trusted like that. He has brought this concert film thing to a new level of popularity, which has really paved the way for me to be able to do it myself." When Wrench was told about Laufey's intention to film a concert movie, he was surprised and interested by the prospect of a one-night shoot at the Hollywood Bowl—as opposed to several shoots across a "stadium run"—in addition to how Laufey interacted with the Los Angeles Philharmonic on stage. Wrench was also convinced by the demand for a concert movie involving Laufey; the Bewitched Tour had quickly sold out, merch sales were "through the roof in comparison to almost any other artist", and Laufey fans in particular were "so supportive" that he knew turnout would be high.

When asked about his specific vision for the concert movie, Wrench found that it was straightforward to put together due to the "intimacy", "authenticity", and "energy" captured in a single night at the Hollywood Bowl during Laufey and the Los Angeles Philharmonic's performance: "It wasn't like we had to put all these nights together to try to make something awesome... It's such a great concert. Everyone enjoyed it. We pointed some cameras, and here we are."

=== Promotion ===
On October 23, Laufey released a teaser clip from the concert movie showcasing her performance of "From The Start" as well as her fans' iconic "blah blah blah" sing-a-long during the song's first verse. Shortly after, on October 30, she released a trailer.

=== Premiere ===
The film premiered at an AMC Theatre at The Grove in Los Angeles on November 19. The screening was followed by a red carpet and a Q&A involving Laufey and Wrench. There, Laufey stated that her idea for a concert movie emerged from a desire to provide "a fun way to be able to experience the concert in a more accessible way" to fans in cities where she had not yet performed. She also observed that "It's getting rarer and rarer to see young people at the symphony" and thus wanted to "bring it to young audiences and to my audience".

== Critical reception ==
Mike Wass, in Flood Magazine, opened his review stating that concert movies were "usually the domain of veteran superstars like Taylor Swift and Beyoncé, but Laufey bucks the trend with flair and no shortage of whimsy". He lauded how Laufey's confidence in performing was demonstrated from the start to the finish: "It's clear that singing in front of an ocean of instruments is Laufey's happy place, and somewhere she intends to spend a lot more time."

In Variety, Chris Willman referred to Laufey as a combination of Swift and Keely Smith, ultimately calling her:

... the perfect Hollywood Bowl act... A chanteuse who would have seemed at home on the same stage in the 1950s, yet who appeals to a young demographic in the 2020s. A multi-instrumentalist with chops on electric guitar, piano and cello. A romantic with a great sense of swooniness that feels apropos for a summer date night. And, maybe most importantly: plays well with Thomas Wilkins and woodwinds.

Anna Zanes of Alternative Press compared Laufey's music and persona to that of Judy Garland and Ginger Rogers; she called the performance and concert movie "a marvel" and lauded the opportunity to "see a form of music revived, related to, and really seen so by a new audience, demographic, or generation... Laufey has done this, so naturally and authentically that it appears almost by mistake. She's certainly someone worth getting to know."

Maylee Ohlman, writing for The Central Trend, likened the film's experience to Taylor Swift: The Eras Tour and lauded the cinematography and camera angles incorporated to showcase Laufey's "career-defining" performance. Ohlman also "was pleasantly surprised to see that Laufey incorporated aspects of a documentary as well" through the backstage footage she and Wrench included in between songs.

== Track listing ==
In two sets, the film encompasses most but not all of the songs performed live during Laufey's shows at the Hollywood Bowl. Alongside the film's release on December 6, Laufey released a companion soundtrack by the same name; the track list follows the film's second set.

Title	Album
Set one
"Above the Chinese Restaurant"	Everything I Know About Love
"Second Best"	Bewitched
"Slow Down"	Everything I Know About Love
"Best Friend"	Typical of Me
"Letter to My 13 Year Old Self"	Bewitched
Set two
"Dreamer"	Bewitched
"While You Were Sleeping"	Bewitched
"Falling Behind"	Everything I Know About Love
"Fragile"	Everything I Know About Love
"Let You Break My Heart Again"	
"Valentine"	Everything I Know About Love
"I Wish You Love"	Typical of Me
"Promise"	Bewitched
"California and Me"	Bewitched
"Goddess"	Bewitched: The Goddess Edition
"It Could Happen to You"	Bewitched: The Goddess Edition
"Bored"	Bewitched: The Goddess Edition
"Lovesick"	Bewitched
"Bewitched"	Bewitched
"From the Start"	Bewitched
