= Devin DeHaven =

American television director and producer

- Born: Sacramento, California, U.S.
- Occupations: Television director, producer
- Years active: 1990–present

Devin DeHaven is a Greek-American television director and producer. His career has spanned three decades with hundreds of live concerts, talk shows and music festivals. He has produced concert cinema releases for Twenty One Pilots "More Than We Ever Imagined" for IMAX and Trafalgar Releasing, the band Ghost's Rite Here Rite Now" and Laufey's "A Night at the Symphony:Hollywood Bowl".

He started his career at Propaganda Films as a music video director, followed by the forming of Fortress Studios, which produced dozens of tour and concert DVD's. His first music video was for the band P.O.D. and followed with tour DVD's for Xzibit, Papa Roach, Korn, Kurupt, Tha Alkaholiks, DJ Quik and others.

Fortress not only produced live shows and festivals, but changed the landscape of live music broadcasts. Taking a unique approach to the craft, pioneering cinematic approaches to festivals, introducing different camera systems and production concepts, and utilizing cloud technology to craft a new, more creative and cost effective way to approach production. Notable highlights include Rock In Rio, New Orleans Jazz & Heritage Festival, Outside Lands, Gov Ball, Life is Beautiful, Electric Daisy Carnival, and many others.

Fortress is now a leader in producing concert films and other special events for worldwide cinema.

== Artists ==
Partial list of artists collaborations:

- Harry Styles
- Twenty One Pilots
- Selena Gomez
- Laufey
- Chase Atlantic
- Ghost_(Swedish_band)
- Charli XCX
- KISS
- Ringo Starr
- John Mellencamp
- Twenty One Pilots
- Bruce Springsteen
- Duran Duran
- Linkin Park
- Snoop Dogg
- Xzibit
- Sammy Hagar
- Dennis DeYoung
- Korn
- Papa Roach
- The Lumineers
- Darius Rucker
- Ceelo Green
- Whitesnake
- Ben Folds
- Aerosmith

== Concert films ==
Twenty One Pilots - More Than We Ever Imagined (Executive Producer)
A concert film documenting the band's massive Mexico City show at Estadio GNP Seguros during The Clancy World Tour. Directed by Mark C. Eshleman, the film features 65,000 fans, behind-the-scenes content, and exclusive commentary from Tyler Joseph and Josh Dun, released in IMAX and theaters globally on February 26, 2026

GHOST - Rite Here Rite Now (Executive Producer)
A 2024 American concert film directed by Tobias Forge and Alex Ross Perry. It features Swedish rock band Ghost performing at the Kia Forum in Inglewood, California, on the final two North American dates of their 2023 Re-Imperatour concert tour. The live concert footage was directed by Jim Parsons. The film includes a narrative story based on a web series produced by the band, which incorporates fictional characters and lore surrounding them.

Rite Here Rite Now was released in cinemas globally by Trafalgar Releasing on June 20 and 22, 2024

LAUFEY - A Night at the Symphony: Hollywood Bowl (Executive Producer)
2024 concert movie filmed from Icelandic singer-songwriter Laufey's Bewitched Tour August 6 show at the Hollywood Bowl. There, she performed alongside the Los Angeles Philharmonic conducted by Thomas Wilkins. The film presents a majority of the songs played at the show broken up by behind-the-scenes clips where Laufey discusses her upbringing and musical journey

The film was directed by Sam Wrench, produced by Veeps Studios, and distributed to cinemas by Trafalgar Releasing. Laufey's sister, Junia Lin Jonsdottir, served as the film's creative director.

P.O.D. - ECHOES (Executive Producer)
Currently in production. A long form documentary on the band P.O.D. chronicling their career, featuring archive footage, live performances and interviews with the band, fellow artists, producers and other key players in the industry. Directed by Christian Lamb and slated to be released in 2026.

== Talk shows ==
BEHIND THE RHYME (Executive Producer/Director)
Behind The Rhyme hosted by Kool Moe Dee that features current stars and legends of hip hop in an intimate one on one setting. The first episode premiered in June 2017 with guest Chuck D.

TOM GREEN LIVE (Producer/Director)
On October 3, 2013, Tom Green Live debuted on AXS TV. The weekly live broadcast, hosted by comedian Tom Green aired at 9pm ET every Thursday night from a studio in Los Angeles. The telecast has a similar format to the web show, with an hour long discussion between Green and his featured guest and live Skype calls from viewers. Although it was intended for the series to showcase Green's more serious side and highlight his skills as an interviewer, he has advised viewers to expect "spontaneous, ridiculous, and outrageous conversations". Guests have included Richard Belzer, Howie Mandel and Tony Hawk. Season 2 debuted on January 9, 2014, and the finale was April 3, 2014. The show was renewed with season 3 debuting on June 12, 2014, with guest Steve Carell.

KOBE UP CLOSE (Director)
On August 15, 2013 AXS TV broadcast a live interview program of Los Angeles Laker legend Kobe Bryant hosted by Jimmy Kimmel. The program was a charity event for The Kobe and Vanessa Bryant Family Foundation and Cedars-Sinai Medical Center's Sports Spectacular and featured a one-hour, in depth interview on his long career in the NBA.

TWITCH EP of BEHIND THE RHYME on Twitch. Behind the Rhyme is considered a leading hip hop site on Twitch featuring the biggest acts in hip hop from all eras.
