= A Night at the Symphony (disambiguation) =

A Night at the Symphony is a 2023 live album and concert video by Laufey with the Iceland Symphony Orchestra.

A Night at the Symphony may also refer to:

- A Night at the Symphony: Hollywood Bowl, a 2024 concert movie filmed from Icelandic singer-songwriter Laufey's Bewitched Tour August 6 show at the Hollywood Bowl
- A Night at the Symphony (Reacher), a 2023 TV episode
