= Falling Behind =

2022 song by Laufey

Single by Laufey

from the album Everything I Know About Love
- Released: 11 August 2022
- Length: 2:53
- Label: AWAL
- Songwriters: Laufey; Spencer Stewart
- Producers: Laufey; Spencer Stewart

Laufey singles chronology
"Dear Soulmate" (2022)	"Falling Behind" (2022)	"Ain't Christmas" (2022)

Music video
- "Falling Behind" on YouTube

"Falling Behind" is a song by Icelandic singer-songwriter Laufey, from her debut studio album, Everything I Know About Love (2022). It was released on 11 August 2022 through AWAL as a preceding single for the album. It was written and produced by Laufey and Spencer Stewart. It is a bossa nova-inspired track that features piano and acoustic guitar, with lyrics that talk about the feeling of not finding a romantic partner while others have.

Music critics praised "Falling Behind" due to its bossa nova-inspired tune and relatability amongst listeners. It received certifications in Australia, New Zealand, and the United States. The track was also included in Laufey's live album A Night at the Symphony (2023) and concert movie A Night at the Symphony: Hollywood Bowl (2024).

== Background ==
Icelandic singer-songwriter Laufey released her debut single entitled "Street by Street" in 2020, which charted at number one on Icelandic Radio. She then released her debut extended play (EP) the following year entitled Typical of Me (2021), which includes the song and six other songs that follows themes of romance. Neil Yeung of AllMusic described every song on the EP as a "gem, brimming with potential", while Anna D’Amico of American Songwriter described Laufey having a "perfect modern jazz sound and low alto voice", highlighting her distinct sound from other musicians.

In June 2022, Laufey announced her debut studio album Everything I Know About Love alongside the release of her third single that year named "Fragile". The album tackles themes about growing, self-described as very "hopeless romantic", drawing in inspiration from personal experiences to make the album. When she announced the album, she also announced its track list which included the single "Falling Behind".

== Release and composition ==
"Falling Behind" was released on 11 August 2022 through AWAL as the album's fifth preceding single. She drew in inspiration to write the song based on her personal experiences where she had seen people close to her fall in love while she had not, feeling she was left behind. It was also included in her live album A Night at the Symphony (2023) and concert movie A Night at the Symphony: Hollywood Bowl (2024).

"Falling Behind" is two minutes and 53 seconds long. Alongside Laufey's vocals, it is accompanied with piano and acoustic guitar played by Laufey herself. It was written and produced by Laufey and Spencer Stewart. The song was mixed by Steve Kaye with assistant mixing engineer Jannick Frampton, and mastered by Joe LaPorta. It is a bossa nova-influenced song that is self-described by Laufey as a "hopeless romantic's summer anthem." Lyrically, the song talks about the anxiety of not finding a romantic partner while those close to you have.

== Reception and commercial performance ==
"Falling Behind" was met with positive reviews upon release, mostly due to its bossa nova-inspired tune. In a full review of the single's album, Yeung described that Laufey showed "some bossa nova flair" through the song. In a performance of the song during the Manila leg of the Bewitched Tour (2023–2024) in May 2024, Gabriel Saulog of Billboard Philippines called it a fan-favorite, citing a "slight cheekiness" with Laufey's vocal delivery of the song accompanied by the guitar. "Falling Behind" was certified gold in Australia and New Zealand, and platinum in the United States.

== Personnel ==
Credits adapted from the liner notes of Everything I Know About Love.

- Laufey – vocals, piano, acoustic guitar, producer and songwriter
- Spencer Stewart – producer and songwriter
- Steve Kaye – mixing engineer
- Jannick Frampton – assistant mixing engineer
- Joe LaPorta – mastering engineer

== Certifications ==
Certifications for "Falling Behind"
Region	Certification	Certified units/sales
Australia (ARIA)	Gold	35,000^{‡}
New Zealand (RMNZ)	Platinum	30,000^{‡}
United Kingdom (BPI)	Silver	200,000^{‡}
United States (RIAA)	Platinum	1,000,000^{‡}
^{‡} Sales+streaming figures based on certification alone.
