= Valentine (Laufey song) =

2022 single by Laufey

Single by Laufey

from the album Everything I Know About Love
- Released: 14 February 2022
- Genre: Traditional pop; classical jazz
- Length: 2:48
- Label: AWAL
- Songwriters: Laufey; Spencer Stewart
- Producers: Laufey; Spencer Stewart

Laufey singles chronology
"Love to Keep Me Warm" (2021)	"Valentine" (2022)	"Everything I Know About Love" (2022)

Audio video
- "Valentine" on YouTube

"Valentine" is a song by Icelandic musician Laufey. It was released on 14 February 2022 and served as the first single to her debut studio album, Everything I Know About Love, which was released on 26 August that same year.

== Production ==
"Valentine" addresses Laufey's experiences and continuous reflection of her first love.

The song's genre has been described as 50s traditional pop and classical jazz due to its jazz vocals and scat singing, as well as guitar and piano instrumentation joined by light percussion played with a drum brush.

== Background ==
Laufey wrote the song on Valentine's Day and "posted it on TikTok for fun", after which it went viral; the attention prompted Laufey and producer Spencer Stewart to finish, record, and release the song. In Consequence of Sound, Laufey stated that the song was about "being in love for the first time and not quite knowing how to react to it —that electrifying and shocking feeling that you get when you realize someone loves you back".

One of the song's lyrics references Laufey's age being 21 at the time of her first love. When asked about that particular lyric, Laufey remarked in an interview with Notion that her early life was restricted by her desire to "practice and study" classical music, making her "the cleanest, most straight-edge kind of girl... My eye was completely focused on getting into a good university or conservatory. I feel like I didn’t entirely live life in the way that a lot of teenagers let loose early". When she turned 20, however, she "started dating, drinking a little, experiencing different things with friendships" and experienced several life changes and realizations after moving to Boston to study at the Berklee College of Music. Ultimately, she concluded: "My twenties have been my experience of living for the first time".

== Critical reception ==
=== On social media ===
Both while it was unfinished and then subsequently released, "Valentine" gained viral traction on TikTok; some have particularly pointed to the song's internet success as a starting point for Laufey's claim to fame, commercial popularity, and name recognition online, as well as in the pop and jazz genres. Of the song's hit status, Atwood Magazine wrote: "Over the past month or so, Laufey gained TikTok virality with her February 14th single, 'Valentine,' a more youthful and awkwardly endearing track on avoiding and embracing newfound love; it’s no surprise that this was a hit among the app’s predominant Gen-Z demographic".

In The Guardian, in 2024, Laufey reflected on the internet success of the song, stating, "It's just a jazz song that I wrote on Valentine's Day, kind of as a joke, but once I posted it, my phone started blowing up... Now it’s become like a new standard. It’s fun that a song I wrote as a homage to the past can be understood as new music".

=== In publications ===
Impact 89FM said "Laufey’s deep voice is ethereal; even when she’s scatting it’s beautiful. Laufey sings about her doubts about what love is supposed to feel like in "Valentine'... Everyone has had their first love, but maybe hasn’t had the words to describe it. Laufey does it perfectly".

Clash wrote that "it's a beatific song, halo'd in beauty, with Laufey seeking out that special connection. Pulling down the barriers, Laufey seems to invite you further into her world with each passing this —'Valentine' is something special".

Of the single, Music Talkers stated that "Songs of old are long past, but their spirits are still very alive, even in our youngest generations —Laufey brings the sound of traditional vocal jazz to the modern soundscape in one of the greatest studies of the genre I’ve heard in my lifetime... The authenticity of every element of the song comparatively to the legends that paved music today back in the 1950s is beautiful". Her Campus called the song "a perfect representation of a first love and having absolutely no freaking idea what is right and what is wrong".

Heike Chaney, writing for Basement Medicine, compared Laufey's style to Chet Baker and Julie London, observing its likeness to the aesthetics of Breakfast at Tiffany's. She then stated, "I will always be grateful for Laufey’s beautiful artistry, as well as the messages behind her music relating to the realities of finding romance, coping with drifting away from your childhood, and a new re-awakening of jazz".

== Live performances ==
For Valentine's Day in 2023, Laufey released a new arrangement of the song with the Iceland Symphony Orchestra which had been performed at Harpa Music Hall during shows in Reykjavík. It was later featured as the second track on her live album, A Night at the Symphony, which released shortly after in March. Of the new live rendition, Music Talkers opined, "Last year, Laufey blessed us all with one of the greatest vocal jazz performances with 'Valentine'... The only thing that could make that song better would be a full symphony to accompany the talented singer, which is what we got".

In 2024, Laufey uploaded a live recording of "Valentine" which had been filmed during a Bewitched Tour stop in Manila in the Philippines. That same year, Laufey performed the song on Valentine's Day during a tour stop in Manchester in England; while she performed, the audience unleashed a mass of handcrafted hearts made from paper, which had been planned and scheduled as a surprise for Laufey by fans. The gesture prompted her to state, on stage, "I’ve never felt so loved on Valentine’s Day, how serendipitous!" Later, in December, Laufey's concert movie, A Night at the Symphony: Hollywood Bowl, featured a live rendition of "Valentine" performed with the Los Angeles Philharmonic at the Hollywood Bowl.

== Personnel ==
- Laufey — writing, production
- Spencer Stewart — writing, production

== Charts ==
=== Weekly charts ===
Weekly chart performance for "Valentine"
Chart (2023–2025)	Peak position
UK Singles Sales (OCC)	3
UK Vinyl Singles (OCC)	1

=== Year-end charts ===
Year-end chart performance for "Valentine"
Chart (2025)	Position
UK Vinyl Singles (OCC)	26

== Certifications ==
Certifications and sales for "Valentine"
Region	Certification	Certified units/sales
Australia (ARIA)	Gold	35,000^{‡}
New Zealand (RMNZ)	Gold	15,000^{‡}
United States (RIAA)	Platinum	1,000,000^{‡}
^{‡} Sales+streaming figures based on certification alone.

== Release history ==
Release history for "Valentine"
Region	Date	Format(s)	Version(s)	Label(s)	Ref.
Various	14 February 2022	Streaming; digital download	Original	AWAL	
Various	14 February 2023	Streaming	Live with ISO	AWAL	
Various	22 April 2023	12-inch vinyl	Original; live	AWAL	
Various	14 August 2023	Streaming; digital download	Sped-up	AWAL	
Various	6 February 2026	12-inch vinyl	Original	Vingolf; AWAL	
