= Sam Wrench =

British filmmaker

- Born: 1990 or 1991 (age 35–36)
- Occupations: Film director, music video director
- Years active: 2015–present
- Notable work: BTS: Permission to Dance on Stage – LA; Taylor Swift: The Eras Tour
- Spouse: Emma Easton

Sam Wrench (born 1991 in Hampstead, London) is a British director, known for his concert films and music competition TV shows, in particular BTS: Permission to Dance on Stage – LA (2022), Billie Eilish: Live at the O2 (2023) and Taylor Swift: The Eras Tour (2023). He was nominated for a Grammy Award for Best Music Film in 2023.

In addition to his concert film work he directed debut seasons of Rhythm and Flow, La Firma, My Kind of Country, The Road and Alter Ego, as well as episodes of American Idol.

== Directing ==
Year	Project	Outlet	Notes	Ref.
2015	Mary J. Blige: The London Sessions	Theatrical release	American singer-songwriter Mary J. Blige's documentary film for her 2014 album The London Sessions. The film made its debut at the 2015 Tribeca Film Festival.	
2015	Blur: New World Towers			
2016	Mumford & Sons: We Wrote This Yesterday			
2022	Brandi Carlile: In the Canyon Haze Live			
2022	BTS: Permission to Dance on Stage – LA	Disney+	South Korean band BTS's Permission to Dance on Stage performances at SoFi Stadium in Los Angeles in late 2021	
2022	Lizzo: Live in Concert	HBO Max	American singer and rapper Lizzo's Special Tour performance at Kia Forum in Inglewood, California on 18 and 19 November 2022	
2023	Billie Eilish: Live at the O2	Apple Music	American singer Billie Eilish's Happier Than Ever World Tour performance at the O2 Arena in London in June 2022	
2023	Taylor Swift: The Eras Tour	Theatrical release	American singer-songwriter Taylor Swift's 2023 Eras Tour performances in Los Angeles	
2024	Andrea Bocelli 30: The Celebration	Theatrical release Canale 5	Italian tenor Andrea Bocelli's concert event on 15, 17 and 19 July 2024, at the Teatro del Silenzio in Lajatico, Italy	
2024	A Nonsense Christmas with Sabrina Carpenter	Netflix	American singer Sabrina Carpenter's musical Christmas special	
2024	A Night at the Symphony: Hollywood Bowl	Theatrical release	Icelandic singer-songwriter Laufey's 2024 Bewitched Tour performance at the Hollywood Bowl with the Los Angeles Philharmonic conducted by Thomas Wilkins	
2024	The Real Full Monty	Fox	American TV special based on the British television specials of the same name.	
2025	Christina Aguilera: Christmas in Paris	Theatrical release	American singer Christina Aguilera's 2025 performance in Paris in support of the 25th anniversary of her 2000 Christmas album, My Kind of Christmas	
2026	Hannah Montana 20th Anniversary Special	Disney+	Television special to commemorate the 20th anniversary of the teen sitcom Hannah Montana.	

In March 2025, it was announced that Wrench would be directing a potential remake of the 1980 American musical drama film The Idolmaker. In April 2025, it was announced that Wrench would be directing a potential remake of the 1992 American romantic thriller drama film The Bodyguard.

== Awards and nominations ==
Year	Award	Category	Work	Result	Ref.
2023	Grammy Award	Best Music Film	Billie Eilish: Live at the O2	Nominated	
