= Christmas Magic (song) =

2024 single by Laufey

Single by Laufey
- Released: 7 November 2024
- Genre: Christmas; Jazz
- Length: 3:10
- Label: Vingolf; AWAL
- Songwriters: Laufey; Spencer Stewart
- Producers: Laufey; Spencer Stewart

Laufey singles chronology
"Santa Baby" (2024)	"Christmas Magic" (2024)	"Silver Lining" (2025)

"Christmas Magic" is a song by Icelandic singer-songwriter Laufey, released on 7 November 2024 exclusively on Amazon Music. It is featured on the 2024 film Red One.

== Background ==
Laufey said of the song:

Writing an original Christmas song was such a fun challenge. My fans know I love the holiday season, and I wanted to give them something special this year to thank them for all of their support. Then having an original in the film Red One was a pleasure, combining the two was the perfect gift!

== Composition ==
"Christmas Magic" is a jazz-inflected, Christmas-themed song, inspired by Ella Fitzgerald.

== Live performances ==
Laufey performed the song on BBC Radio 1's Live Lounge and The Graham Norton Show on 17 and 20 December 2024, respectively.

== Charts ==
Weekly chart performance for "Christmas Magic"
Chart (2024–2025)	Peak position
Global 200 (Billboard)	80
Ireland (IRMA)	99
UK Singles (OCC)	13
UK Independent Singles (OCC)	2
US Billboard Hot 100	56
US Holiday 100 (Billboard)	50

== Release history ==
Release history for "Christmas Magic"
Region	Date	Format(s)	Version	Label(s)	Ref.
Various	7 November 2024	Streaming; digital download	Original (Amazon Music)	Vingolf; AWAL	
Various	20 December 2024	7-inch vinyl	Original (Amazon Music)	Vingolf; AWAL	
