= A Big Bold Beautiful Journey (soundtrack) =

A Big Bold Beautiful Journey (Original Motion Picture Soundtrack)

Studio album by Joe Hisaishi
- Released: September 19, 2025
- Recorded: 2025
- Length: 59:32
- Label: Milan
- Producer: Joe Hisaishi

Joe Hisaishi chronology
The Boy and the Heron (2023)	A Big Bold Beautiful Journey (2025)

A Big Bold Beautiful Journey (Original Motion Picture Soundtrack) is the soundtrack album to the 2025 film A Big Bold Beautiful Journey directed by Kogonada and starring Margot Robbie, Colin Farrell, Kevin Kline and Phoebe Waller-Bridge. The film's soundtrack featured original score by Joe Hisaishi and songs performed by Laufey and Mitski. The album was released through Milan Records on September 19, 2025.

== Development ==
Joe Hisaishi was announced as the film composer in June 2025. Kogonada recalled that his representative reached out to him and was stunned on their decision to involve Hisaishi as the composer, immediately agreeing, calling it as a collaboration he would never forget. While working on the score, he did not give many notes to Hisaishi, but the latter provided a layer which he felt unexpected. Kogonada noted that any other composer in that space would provide music that played with the emotional beats, but Hisaishi provided a different space where the sense of romance which layered underneath provided a rhythm to the film.

The film also featured four songs performed by Laufey and Mitski, with two of them being cover versions of "Winter Wonderland" and Pete Townshend's "Let My Love Open the Door". Laufey, on her involvement, stated that she instantly connected on Kogonada's way of escapism "referencing themes of the past while keeping it modern" and the plot mirrored her album A Matter of Time (2025) which explored how time impacts, life, love and experiences while also being deeply tied with her artistry.

== Track listing ==
No.	Title	Artist(s)	Length
1.	"Rain"		1:51
2.	"I'm Not"		0:47
3.	"The Point" (Bonus Track)		0:13
4.	"Sarah and David"		5:10
5.	"A Big, Bold, Beautiful Journey"		1:24
6.	"The Door" (Bonus Track)		1:27
7.	"The Lighthouse"		2:28
8.	"Silent" (Bonus Track)		2:35
9.	"Memory of Dad"		2:37
10.	"High School"		1:15
11.	"Mom Passed Away"		1:33
12.	"To Her Mother's Side"		3:08
13.	"Memories of Mother"		2:09
14.	"The Balloon and the Bear"		1:56
15.	"Earth Kiss"		1:50
16.	"Couple Fight"		0:36
17.	"The Accident" (Bonus Track)		1:26
18.	"Midnight Walk"		0:38
19.	"Two Paths"		1:35
20.	"The Childhood Home"		1:45
21.	"When I Was Young"		1:54
22.	"Meet Again" (Bonus Track)		1:07
23.	"The Risk"	Laufey	3:58
24.	"Winter Wonderland"	Laufey	2:13
25.	"But Beautiful"	Laufey	4:32
26.	"Let's Dream in the Moonlight" (Take 1)	Laufey	2:48
27.	"Let My Love Open the Door"	Mitski	2:42
28.	"The Risk" (Instrumental)	Laufey	3:58
Total length:			59:32

== Reception ==
Pete Hammond of Deadline Hollywood wrote "the score by ace Japanese composer Joe Hisaishi tries valiantly to catch the mood." Conor O'Donnell of The Film Stage wrote "A few unironic needle drops (again pulling from a mid-aughts playbook) are at odds with the legendary Joe Hisaishi's lovely score, possibly betraying studio notes that don't know what to make of the film's calculus." Iana Murray of Little White Lies wrote "a delicate score from the legendary Joe Hisaishi that's more minimalist than his Studio Ghibli collaborations – but equally as transportive." Hoai Tran-Rui of Inverse called the score "fantastic". Gemma Wilson of The Seattle Times called it "a simple, piano-forward score from Joe Hisaishi, a frequent Studio Ghibli collaborator." Kyle Smith of The Wall Street Journal called it a "gently appalling musical score". Ty Burr of The Washington Post wrote "The plaintive score is by Studio Ghibli stalwart Joe Hisaishi, his first for a Hollywood film."

== Additional music ==
The following songs are featured in the film, but not included in the soundtrack album:

- "One" – A Chorus Line Ensemble
- "Full of Life" – Christine and the Queens
- "People Will Make You Say Things" – Frank Lynch
- "Shout, Pts. 1&2" – The Isley Brothers
- "Islands & Shores" – Deportees
- "You and I" – Wilco
- "Dream Team" – Of Monsters and Men
- "Coinleach Glas An Fhomhair" – Clannad
- "Bug Like an Angel" – Mitski
- "First Day of My Life" – Bright Eyes
