= Mei Mei the Bunny =

2026 book by Laufey

- Author: Laufey
- Illustrator: Lauren O'Hara
- Publisher: Penguin
- Publication date: 21 April 2026
- ISBN: 979-8-217-05174-8

Mei Mei the Bunny is the debut children's picture book written by Icelandic singer-songwriter Laufey and illustrated by Dublin artist Lauren O'Hara. It was published on 21 April 2026, through Penguin Workshop.

== Background ==
Laufey expanded her mascot character Mei Mei the Bunny (Chinese: 妹妹; pinyin: mèimei; lit. 'younger sister') into a picture book. Mei Mei the Bunny originated in 2024 through the Laufey Book Club (founded in 2022). Mei Mei the Bunny's plot was inspired by classical music education. The book explores themes of self-expression, overcoming mistakes, and finding one's voice. Laufey describes the project as a meaningful expansion of Mei Mei's world and hopes it inspires readers of all ages.

== Plot ==
The story centers around Mei Mei, a young girl with aspirations of becoming a musician, who trains intensely for her first show at the H'Opera House. With her recital fast approaching, she feels a lot of stage fright and anxiety. While performing, she commits an error in technique when she plays the wrong note. The story revolves around how she deals with the situation and comes to understand that being perfect is not necessary in music.
