= Madwoman (song) =

2026 song by Laufey

Single by Laufey

from the album A Matter of Time: The Final Hour
- Released: 4 May 2026
- Length: 3:59
- Label: Vingolf; AWAL
- Songwriters: Laufey; Spencer Stewart
- Producers: Laufey; Stewart

Laufey singles chronology
"How I Get" (2026)	"Madwoman" (2026)

Music video
- "Madwoman" on YouTube

"Madwoman" is a song by Laufey and the sixteenth track on the deluxe version of her third studio album, A Matter of Time, which was released on 10 April 2026. A music video starring Alysa Liu, Hudson Williams, Lola Tung, and Megan Skiendiel was premiered on 13 April. The track was officially sent to Icelandic radio stations on the week of 4 May. "Madwoman" is nominated for the inaugural Best Traditional Pop Vocal Performance award at the 69th Annual Grammy Awards.

== Music video ==
The music video features Liu, Williams, Tung, and Skiendiel starring alongside Laufey; all of mixed white and East Asian descent (colloquially termed Wasian). Executive producer Christine Yi said: "The all 'wasian' cast is definitely one of those firsts, and I think it brings light to another unique and beautiful facet of the Asian diaspora." Warren Fu, director of the music video, commented that the music video "reimagines the American Dream as something more inclusive." Filmed in Los Angeles in March 2026, the music video was inspired by the works of Slim Aarons and evokes the styles of mid-century Americana and Hong Kong.

Details of the collaboration were teased on 7 April 2026, when Laufey posted a TikTok video with Liu dancing to the PinkPantheress and Zara Larsson song "Stateside". Laufey captioned it "welcome to the party @alysaxliu 🌼🧡", to which Liu reshared and replied, "Madwoman let's gooo". Laufey then posted another TikTok with both Liu and Skiendiel an hour later.

== Promotion ==
On 9 April 2026, the grocery chain Erewhon announced a collaborative smoothie, "The Madwoman Smoothie", with beverage brand Real Coco. It includes "oat milk, cacao, black sesame butter, pink peppercorns, berries, banana and pomegranate juice". A portion of the proceeds go to the Laufey Foundation.

== Charts ==
Weekly chart performance for "Madwoman"
Chart (2026)	Peak position
New Zealand Hot Singles (RMNZ)	14
UK Singles Sales (OCC)	90
UK Singles Downloads (OCC)	86
