= Bewitched Tour =

2023–2024 concert tour by Laufey

The Bewitched Tour
- Tour by Laufey
- Official tour poster
- Location: North America, Europe, Asia, Australia
- Associated album: Bewitched
- Start date: October 9, 2023
- End date: September 28, 2024
- Legs: 11
- No. of shows: 110

Laufey concert chronology
- Everything I Know About Love Tour (2022); Bewitched Tour (2023–2024); A Matter of Time Tour (2025–2026)

The Bewitched Tour (known as Bewitched: The Goddess Tour for the 2024 dates) was the second concert tour by Icelandic musician Laufey.

== Background ==
In September 2023, Laufey released her second full-length album, Bewitched. In the fall of 2023, Laufey embarked on a North American headlining tour, which sold out instantly.

In early 2024, Laufey began a European tour. She also started a second North American leg titled "Bewitched: The Goddess Tour," which sold out quickly.

In May 2024, Laufey performed several shows in Asia. She also announced additional European dates for July; however, in June, she cancelled these dates due to an "irreversible scheduling conflict." In August and September 2024, Laufey returned to Asia for more shows, including her first arena headline show at the SM Mall of Asia Arena in the Philippines, and toured Australia for the first time.

== Critical reception ==
The tour received positive reviews. Writing for Boston.com, Maddie Browning said, "She is the leading lady in a theatrical performance about the trials and immense joys of young love, drawing inspiration from artists like jazz icon Ella Fitzgerald." Writing for The Harvard Crimson, Claire Elliott wrote "The shared theme of love across her songs only intensified her brilliant performance. Laufey’s songs are not simply about love in its vague sense. She treats every type of love — ecstasy, heartache, anger, and even confusion — with the same delicacy and attention. As a result, her performance becomes an encapsulation of what it means to love — making it quite hard not to love her."

== Set list ==
This set list is representative of the show in Boston on 7 May 2024. It is not representative of all concerts for the duration of the tour.

1. "While You Were Sleeping"
2. "Valentine"
3. "Second Best"
4. "Dreamer"
5. "Falling Behind"
6. "Beautiful Stranger"
7. "I Wish You Love" (Keely Smith cover)
8. "Promise"
9. "Like the Movies"
10. "Nocturne (Interlude)"
11. "Let You Break My Heart Again"
12. "California and Me"
13. "Goddess"
14. "Fragile"
15. "Bewitched"
16. "Bored"
17. "Lovesick"
18. "From the Start"

Encore

19. "Letter to My 13 Year Old Self"
20. "Street by Street"

== Tour dates ==
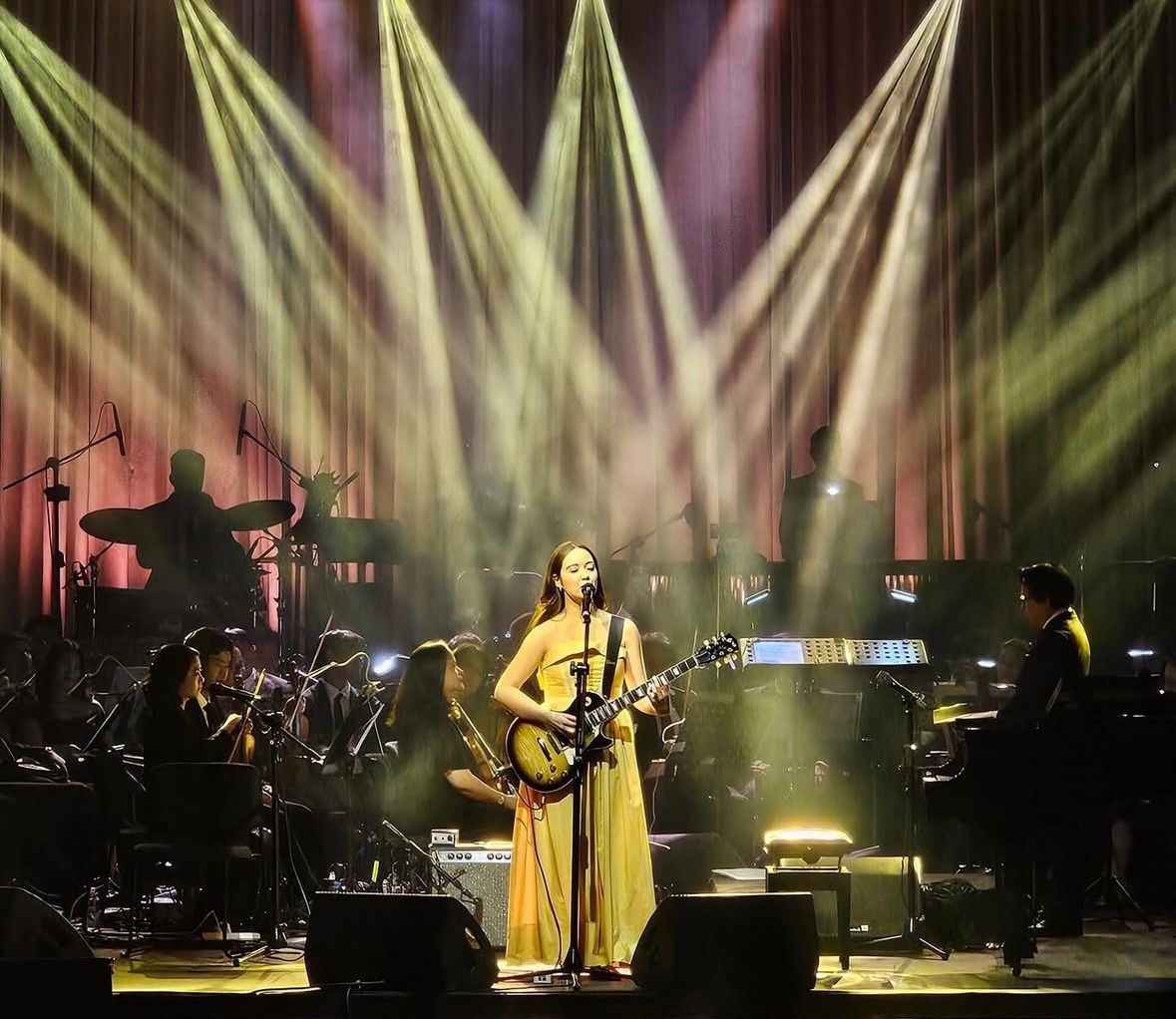
Laufey performing with the Manila Philharmonic Orchestra in May 2024

List of concerts, showing date, city, country, venue, and opening acts
Date	City	Country	Venue	Opening acts
Leg 1 – North America
9 October 2023	San Francisco	United States	The Fillmore	Adam Melchor
10 October 2023	San Francisco	United States	The Fillmore	Adam Melchor
11 October 2023	Portland	United States	Revolution Hall	Adam Melchor
13 October 2023	Vancouver	Canada	Hollywood Theatre	Adam Melchor
14 October 2023	Vancouver	Canada	Hollywood Theatre	Adam Melchor
17 October 2023	Salt Lake City	United States	The Depot	Adam Melchor
18 October 2023	Englewood	United States	Gothic Theatre	Adam Melchor
20 October 2023	St. Paul	United States	Fitzgerald Theater	Adam Melchor
21 October 2023	Chicago	United States	Thalia Hall	Adam Melchor
22 October 2023	Chicago	United States	Thalia Hall	Adam Melchor
24 October 2023	Cleveland	United States	The Beachland Ballroom	Adam Melchor
25 October 2023	Detroit	United States	Majestic Theatre	Adam Melchor
27 October 2023	Toronto	Canada	Danforth Music Hall	Adam Melchor
28 October 2023	Montreal	Canada	Beanfield Theatre	Adam Melchor
29 October 2023	Boston	United States	Wilbur Theatre	Adam Melchor
1 November 2023	New York City	United States	The Town Hall	Adam Melchor
2 November 2023	New York City	United States	The Town Hall	Adam Melchor
3 November 2023	Philadelphia	United States	Theatre of Living Arts	Adam Melchor
4 November 2023	Washington, D.C.	United States	Lincoln Theatre (Washington, D.C.)	Adam Melchor
6 November 2023	Nashville	United States	Riverside Revival	Adam Melchor
7 November 2023	Atlanta	United States	Variety Playhouse	Adam Melchor
9 November 2023	Houston	United States	White Oak Music Hall	Adam Melchor
10 November 2023	Austin	United States	Paramount Theatre	Adam Melchor
11 November 2023	Dallas	United States	The Echo Lounge & Music Hall	Adam Melchor
13 November 2023	Phoenix	United States	The Van Buren	Adam Melchor
15 November 2023	San Diego	United States	The Magnolia	Adam Melchor
17 November 2023	Santa Ana	United States	The Observatory	Adam Melchor
18 November 2023	Los Angeles	United States	Theatre at the Ace Hotel	Adam Melchor
19 November 2023	Los Angeles	United States	Theatre at the Ace Hotel	Adam Melchor
Leg 2 – Europe
10 February 2024	Dublin	Ireland	The Academy	Adam Melchor
10 February 2024	Dublin	Ireland	The Academy	Adam Melchor
11 February 2024	Glasgow	Scotland	SWG3 Galvanizers	Adam Melchor
14 February 2024	Manchester	England	Albert Hall	Adam Melchor
15 February 2024	London	England	EartH	Adam Melchor
16 February 2024	London	England	EartH	Adam Melchor
17 February 2024	London	England	EartH	Adam Melchor
20 February 2024	Paris	France	Le Trianon	Adam Melchor
21 February 2024	Brussels	Belgium	La Madeleine	Adam Melchor
23 February 2024	Hamburg	Germany	Große Freiheit 36	Adam Melchor
25 February 2024	Stockholm	Sweden	Nalen	Adam Melchor
26 February 2024	Copenhagen	Denmark	Vega	Adam Melchor
27 February 2024	Berlin	Germany	Astra Kulturhaus	Adam Melchor
29 February 2024	Milan	Italy	Magazzini Generali	Adam Melchor
3 March 2024	Lausanne	Switzerland	Les Docks	Adam Melchor
5 March 2024	Cologne	Germany	Carlswerk Victoria	Adam Melchor
6 March 2024	Amsterdam	Netherlands	Melkweg	Adam Melchor
9 March 2024	Reykjavík	Iceland	Eldborg Harpa	Adam Melchor
10 March 2024	Reykjavík	Iceland	Eldborg Harpa	Adam Melchor
Leg 3 – North America
8 April 2024	Vancouver	Canada	Queen Elizabeth Theatre	Wasia Project
9 April 2024	Seattle	United States	Paramount Theatre	Wasia Project
11 April 2024	San Francisco	United States	The Masonic	Wasia Project
12 April 2024	San Francisco	United States	The Masonic	Wasia Project
13 April 2024	San Francisco	United States	The Masonic	Wasia Project
15 April 2024	Phoenix	United States	Arizona Financial Theatre	Wasia Project
17 April 2024	Dallas	United States	Margot and Bill Winspear Opera House	Wasia Project
18 April 2024	Dallas	United States	Margot and Bill Winspear Opera House	Wasia Project
19 April 2024	Austin	United States	Bass Concert Hall	Wasia Project
20 April 2024	Houston	United States	713 Music Hall	Wasia Project
22 April 2024	Atlanta	United States	Tabernacle	Wasia Project
23 April 2024	Nashville	United States	Ryman Auditorium	Wasia Project
25 April 2024	Washington, D.C.	United States	The Anthem	Wasia Project
26 April 2024	Washington, D.C.	United States	The Anthem	Wasia Project
28 April 2024	Chicago	United States	Chicago Theatre	Wasia Project
30 April 2024	Toronto	Canada	Massey Hall	Wasia Project
1 May 2024	Toronto	Canada	Massey Hall	Wasia Project
3 May 2024	New York City	United States	Radio City Music Hall	Wasia Project
4 May 2024	New York City	United States	Radio City Music Hall	Wasia Project
6 May 2024	Philadelphia	United States	Metropolitan Opera House	Wasia Project
7 May 2024	Boston	United States	Wang Theatre	Wasia Project
Leg 4 – Europe
16 May 2024	London	England	Royal Albert Hall	Matilda Mann
Leg 5 – Asia
25 May 2024	Jakarta	Indonesia	Java Jazz Festival	—N/a
28 May 2024	Manila	Philippines	PICC Plenary Hall	—N/a
29 May 2024	Manila	Philippines	PICC Plenary Hall	—N/a
1 June 2024	Seoul	South Korea	Seoul Jazz Festival	—N/a
Leg 6 – North America
21 June 2024	Salt Lake City	United States	Gallivan Center	Grace Enger and Anna Beck
23 June 2024	Williamsburg	United States	Art Museum of Colonial Williamsburg	Grace Enger
24 June 2024	Pittsburgh	United States	Heinz Hall	—N/a
25 June 2024	Pittsburgh	United States	Heinz Hall	—N/a
26 June 2024	Rochester	United States	Rochester International Jazz Festival	—N/a
28 June 2024	Ottawa	Canada	Ottawa Jazz Festival	—N/a
29 June 2024	Montreal	Canada	Salle Wilfrid-Pelletier	Grace Enger
29 June 2024	Montreal	Canada	Salle Wilfrid-Pelletier	Grace Enger
30 June 2024	Saratoga Springs	United States	Freihofer's Saratoga Jazz Festival	—N/a
Leg 8 – North America
2 August 2024	Chicago	United States	Lollapalooza	—N/a
3 August 2024	Montauk	United States	Montauk Point Light	Grace Enger
4 August 2024	Newport	United States	Newport Jazz Festival	—N/a
7 August 2024	Los Angeles	United States	Hollywood Bowl	—N/a
Leg 9 – Asia
17 August 2024	Tokyo	Japan	Summer Sonic Festival	—N/a
18 August 2024	Osaka	Japan	Summer Sonic Festival	—N/a
20 August 2024	Shanghai	China	Oriental Art Center	—N/a
21 August 2024	Beijing	China	Beijing Exhibition Center	—N/a
23 August 2024	Guangzhou	China	Damai 66 Livehouse	—N/a
25 August 2024	Bangkok	Thailand	Summer Sonic Festival	—N/a
27 August 2024	Kuala Lumpur	Malaysia	Kuala Lumpur Convention Centre	—N/a
29 August 2024	Hong Kong	China	AsiaWorld–Expo	—N/a
31 August 2024	Taipei	Taiwan	Taipei International Convention Center	—N/a
2 September 2024	Manila	Philippines	SM Mall of Asia Arena	—N/a
4 September 2024	Singapore	Singapore	Arena @ Expo	—N/a
Leg 10 – Australia
6 September 2024	Melbourne	Australia	Palais Theatre	—N/a
7 September 2024	Melbourne	Australia	Palais Theatre	—N/a
9 September 2024	Melbourne	Australia	Palais Theatre	—N/a
11 September 2024	Brisbane	Australia	Queensland Performing Arts Centre	—N/a
13 September 2024	Sydney	Australia	Concert Hall, Sydney Opera House	—N/a
14 September 2024	Sydney	Australia	International Convention Centre Sydney	—N/a
Leg 11 – North America
28 September 2024	Columbia	United States	All Things Go Music Festival	—N/a

=== Cancelled shows ===
List of cancelled concerts, showing date, city, country, venue and reason
Date	City	Country	Venue	Reason	Ref.
13 May 2024	Dresden	Germany	Dressner Musikfestspiele	Schedule problems	
14 May 2024	Brno	Czech Republic	Sono Music Club	Schedule problems	
12 July 2024	Rotterdam	Netherlands	North Sea Jazz Festival	Schedule problems	
13 July 2024	Ghent	Belgium	Gent Jazz Festival	Schedule problems	
15 July 2024	Madrid	Spain	Noches del Botanico	Schedule problems	
16 July 2024	Barcelona	Spain	Palau de la Música Catalana	Schedule problems	
18 July 2024	Perugia	Italy	Umbria Jazz Festival	Schedule problems	
19 July 2024	Montreux	Switzerland	Montreux Jazz Festival	Schedule problems	
20 July 2024	Gardone Riviera	Italy	Tener-a-mente	Schedule problems	
21 July 2024	Lucerne	Switzerland	Luzern Live Festival	Schedule problems	
23 July 2024	Marciac	France	Jazz in Marciac	Schedule problems	

== Film ==
On 23 October 2024, Laufey announced that her performance at the Hollywood Bowl on 7 August 2024 would be released in theaters. The film had a limited release, only being shown 6, 7, and 8 December in standard and IMAX formats worldwide. The film added a message from Laufey at the beginning, thanking her fans for this opportunity. During the intermission, a scene was added of Laufey driving around Hollywood Boulevard in her Cadillac, talking about her time living in Los Angeles. The film cut out much of the first half of the performance, but left in all of her performance with the Los Angeles Philharmonic and her talking in between songs.
