= EartH (Evolutionary Arts Hackney) =

Arts centre in London

- Location: 13 Stoke Newington Road, Dalston, London N16 8BH
- Coordinates: 51.5511°N 0.0756°W
- Website: earthackney.co.uk

EartH (Evolutionary Arts Hackney) is an independent arts centre in Dalston, London which opened in 2018 in a former cinema. On the ground floor is a multi-purpose 1200 capacity dedicated events space. Upstairs is a 750 capacity tiered seated Art Deco theatre. Each of these locations hosts live music shows. There is also a restaurant.

The building at 13 Stoke Newington Road was built in 1936 as an Art Deco cinema called The Savoy, later ABC, that ceased operations in 1984. It was later used as a snooker hall and wedding venue, among other uses. "The main auditorium then lay derelict for 40 years" until 2015. After a £3 million redevelopment by Auro Foxcroft and others, Evolutionary Arts Hackney, or EartH, opened there in September 2018.
