= Bewitched (Laufey album) =

Studio album by Laufey
- Released: 8 September 2023
- Studios: Mosey Creative; EastWest; Blackheath Halls; Ballroom West
- Genres: Jazz pop; modern classical
- Length: 48:19
- Label: AWAL
- Producers: Laufey; Philharmonia Orchestra; Spencer Stewart; Dan Wilson

Laufey chronology
A Night at the Symphony (2023)	Bewitched (2023)	A Matter of Time (2025)

Singles from Bewitched
- 1. "From the Start" Released: 11 May 2023; 2. "Promise" Released: 14 June 2023; 3. "Bewitched" Released: 26 July 2023; 4. "California and Me" Released: 24 August 2023

Bewitched is the second studio album by Icelandic singer-songwriter Laufey, released on 8 September 2023 through AWAL. Described by Laufey as "a love album, whether it be a love towards a friend or a lover or life", Bewitched deals with a variety of romantic themes in its songs.

Musically, Bewitched consists of jazz pop ballads, predominantly written by Laufey and collaborator Spencer Stewart, and produced by the duo along with Philharmonia Orchestra and Dan Wilson. The album was met with acclaim from music critics, who complimented the songs for their modern spin on jazz and nostalgic quality at the same time; Laufey's technical skills were also a subject of praise in the reviews. It won Best Traditional Pop Vocal Album at the 66th Annual Grammy Awards.

Four singles preceded the album: "From the Start", "Promise", "Bewitched" and "California and Me", the first of which became Laufey's first song to enter the international record charts. Bewitched peaked at number two on the Icelandic albums chart and was Laufey's first album to chart in Australia, Canada, New Zealand, the United Kingdom, and the United States. Additionally, the album topped several jazz album charts around the world. To support the album, Laufey embarked on the Bewitched Tour.

On 26 April 2024, Laufey released the deluxe edition of the album Bewitched: The Goddess Edition, which was preceded by the single "Goddess" released on the date of the announcement. After the release, the album debuted at number one on the Icelandic albums chart, re-entered the charts in the other aforementioned countries and entered the charts in several European countries.

== Background ==
During the announcement, Laufey described Bewitched as "a love album, whether it be a love towards a friend or a lover or life". She reflected on her first album's theme of becoming an adult and contrasted it with having since "experienced a little bit more of that, and [...] writing about the magic in the love of being young". Shortly prior to releasing the album, Laufey made the sheet music available to fans.

== Critical reception ==
Professional ratings
Aggregate scores
Source	Rating
Metacritic	83/100
Review scores
Source	Rating
DIY	4/5 stars
The Line of Best Fit	8/10
NME	5/5 stars
Pitchfork	7.0/10
Uncut	8/10

Bewitched received a score of 83 out of 100 on review aggregator Metacritic based on six critics' reviews, indicating "universal acclaim". Uncut felt that "if these [tracks] feel like throwbacks, they're no more so than Norah Jones' best work, and there's nonetheless something timeless about the breezy 'While You Were Sleeping' and, with its chugging guitars, 'Lovesick'". In a five-star review, Hannah Mylrea of NME described Bewitched as "confident and musically ambitious, melding jazz, pop and modern classical composition", throughout which "Laufey's impressive technical ability shines".

James Hickey of DIY wrote that Laufey's "crystalline voice and effortless charisma make this album into a gorgeous display of a unique talent", which he also described as "stuffed full of immaculate jazz ballads, shot through with luscious strings and swooning stories of hopeless love". The Line of Best Fit's Matthew Kim opined that Laufey "improves on her already effective formula in just about every department", and while she does not "reinvent the wheel when it comes to the antique jazz-pop sound that she's already mastered", "she certainly diversifies her palette". Alex Ramos of Pitchfork found it to be "bolder and more intentional" than Everything I Know About Love as "here, Laufey doesn't simply let jazz inform the work; she uses it as a vehicle to enact fantasies and ambitions, lending her contemporary musings a misty, out-of-time quality".

=== Year-end lists ===
Critics' rankings for Bewitched
Publication	Accolade	Rank	Ref.
Billboard	Best Albums of 2023	46	
NME	The Best Albums of 2023	33	
Uproxx	The Best Albums of 2023	—N/a	
Variety	The Best Albums of 2023	9	
Vogue	The Best Albums of 2023	—N/a	

=== Accolades ===
Awards for Bewitched
Organisation	Year	Category	Result	Ref.
Grammy Awards	2024	Best Traditional Pop Vocal Album	Won	

== Commercial performance ==
Bewitched debuted at number 23 on the US Billboard 200 and number 1 on the Jazz Albums charts with 23,000 album-equivalent units. The album also broke records as the biggest debut for a jazz album on Spotify in the platform's entire history. Bewitched debuted at number 2 on Spotify's Top Album Debut Global chart (just behind Olivia Rodrigo's Guts album.) The deluxe version, Bewitched: The Goddess Edition debuted at number 18 on the Billboard 200 chart and debuted at number 13 on the Official UK Albums chart, marking her first top 20 appearance on both charts. Bewitched also charted in Canada, Ireland, New Zealand, and Sweden, and was particularly successful in Iceland, where it reached number 1 and remained in the top 20 for both 2023 and 2024.

With Bewitched, Laufey became the most-streamed artist from Iceland worldwide. The album's prominent single, From The Start holds the title of the most streamed jazz song in 2023 and one of the most streamed jazz songs of all time.

Bewitched earned a Gold RIAA Certification on 11 March 2025, being Laufey's first album to earn a Gold RIAA Certification. The first 2 singles from the album, From The Start and Promise both earned RIAA Certifications as well. Promise earned a Gold certification, while From The Start went Platinum twice.

== Track listing ==
All tracks are written by Laufey and Spencer Stewart, except where noted.

Bewitched track listing
No.	Title	Writer(s)	Length
1.	"Dreamer"		3:30
2.	"Second Best"		3:24
3.	"Haunted"		3:20
4.	"Must Be Love"	Laufey; Freddy Wexler; Max Wolfgang	3:04
5.	"While You Were Sleeping"		2:57
6.	"Lovesick"		3:45
7.	"California and Me" (featuring Philharmonia Orchestra)	Laufey	3:36
8.	"Nocturne" (Interlude)	Laufey	2:24
9.	"Promise"	Laufey; Dan Wilson	3:54
10.	"From the Start"		2:49
11.	"Misty"	Johnny Burke; Erroll Garner	3:29
12.	"Serendipity"		3:39
13.	"Letter to My 13 Year Old Self"	Laufey	4:22
14.	"Bewitched"		4:06
Total length:			48:19

Bewitched: The Goddess Edition bonus tracks
No.	Title	Writer(s)	Length
15.	"Bored"		3:33
16.	"Trouble"	Laufey; Stewart; Wilson	2:51
17.	"It Could Happen to You"	Jimmy Van Heusen; Burke	2:07
18.	"Goddess"	Laufey	4:27
Total length:			61:17

Japanese edition live bonus tracks
No.	Title	Writer(s)	Length
19.	"Goddess" (Live from Home)	Laufey	4:42
20.	"Bored" (Live from Home)		3:40
21.	"Trouble" (Live from Home)	Laufey; Stewart; Wilson	2:59
22.	"It Could Happen to You" (Live from Home)	Heusen; Burke	2:21
23.	"From the Start" (Live from Home)		2:58
Total length:			77:57

== Personnel ==
Credits adapted from the album's liner notes.

- Laufey – vocals, guitar, cello, piano, production
- Steve Haye – mixing
- Joe LaPorta – mastering
- Spencer Stewart – production (tracks 1–6, 10–18), additional production (9), arrangement (14), executive production
- Simon Moullier – vibraphone (track 1)
- Jordan Rose – drums (track 1)
- Júnía Lín – violin (tracks 2, 3, 6), creative direction
- Þorleifur Gaukur Davíðsson – slide guitar (track 5)
- Philharmonia Orchestra – production, orchestra (tracks 7, 14)
- Robin O'Neill – conductor (tracks 7, 14)
- Iain Farrington – arrangement (track 7)
- Dan Wilson – production (track 9)
- Sara Mulford – recording (track 9)
- Daniel Ficca – recording (track 9)
- Carson Grant – drums (track 9)
- Ted Case – piano (tracks 11, 16)
- Jonathan Richards – bass (tracks 11, 17)
- Ryan Shaw – drums (tracks 11, 17)
- Hal Rosenfeld – orchestration (track 14)
- Spencer Stewart – arrangement (track 14)
- JJ Kirkpatrick – trumpet (track 16)
- Kelly Ford – physical packaging design
- Gemma Warren – artist photography

== Charts ==
=== Weekly charts ===
Weekly chart performance for Bewitched
Chart (2023–2026)	Peak position
Australian Albums (ARIA)	6
Australian Jazz & Blues Albums (ARIA)	1
Belgian Albums (Ultratop Flanders)	15
Canadian Albums (Billboard)	38
Croatian International Albums (HDU) The Goddess Edition	30
Dutch Albums (Album Top 100)	15
French Jazz Albums (SNEP)	4
German Albums (Offizielle Top 100)	45
Icelandic Albums (Tónlistinn)	2
Icelandic Albums (Tónlistinn) The Goddess Edition	1
Irish Albums (IRMA)	67
Irish Independent Albums (IRMA)	3
New Zealand Albums (RMNZ)	13
Portuguese Albums (AFP)	60
Scottish Albums (Official Charts)	10
Spanish Albums (PROMUSICAE)	99
Swedish Jazz Albums (Sverigetopplistan)	1
UK Albums (Official Charts)	13
UK Independent Albums (Official Charts)	2
UK Jazz & Blues Albums (Official Charts)	1
US Billboard 200	18
US Independent Albums (Billboard)	1
US Jazz Albums (Billboard)	1

=== Year-end charts ===
2023 year-end charts for Bewitched
Chart (2023)	Position
Australian Jazz & Blues Albums (ARIA)	3
Icelandic Albums (Plötutíðindi)	14
US Jazz Albums (Billboard)	12

2024 year-end charts for Bewitched
Chart (2024)	Position
Australian Jazz & Blues Albums (ARIA)	1
Icelandic Albums (Tónlistinn)	14
Icelandic Albums (Tónlistinn) The Goddess Edition	71
US Billboard 200	172
US Independent Albums (Billboard)	22
US Jazz Albums (Billboard)	1

2025 year-end charts for Bewitched
Chart (2025)	Position
Australian Jazz & Blues Albums (ARIA)	2
Icelandic Albums (Tónlistinn)	85
US Independent Albums (Billboard)	25
US Jazz Albums (Billboard)	2

== Certifications and sales ==
Certifications and sales for Bewitched
Region	Certification	Certified units/sales
Iceland (FHF)	—	3,009
New Zealand (RMNZ)	Platinum	15,000^{‡}
New Zealand (RMNZ) The Goddess Edition	Gold	7,500^{‡}
United Kingdom (BPI)	Gold	100,000^{‡}
United States (RIAA)	Platinum	1,000,000^{‡}
^{‡} Sales+streaming figures based on certification alone.

== Release history ==
Release history for Bewitched
Region	Date	Format(s)	Edition	Label	Ref.
Various	8 September 2023	Streaming; digital download	Standard	AWAL	
Various	27 October 2023	LP; CD; cassette	Standard	AWAL	
Various	26 April 2024	Streaming; digital download	The Goddess	AWAL	
Various	26 April 2024	2×LP; CD; cassette	The Goddess	AWAL	
Various	26 April 2024	Streaming; digital download	Instrumental	AWAL	
Japan	3 July 2024	Blu-spec	Live bonus	SMEJ	
