= Goddess (Laufey song) =

Single by Laufey

from the album Bewitched: The Goddess Edition
- Released: 6 March 2024
- Genre: Jazz pop
- Length: 4:27
- Label: Vingolf; AWAL
- Songwriter: Laufey
- Producers: Laufey; Spencer Stewart

Laufey singles chronology
"Winter Wonderland" (2023)	"Goddess" (2024)	"Santa Baby" (2024)

Music video
- "Goddess" on YouTube

"Goddess" is a song by Icelandic singer Laufey. It was released on 6 March 2024 as the lead single from the reissue of her second studio album, Bewitched, subtitled The Goddess Edition.

== Background ==
Laufey released her second studio album, Bewitched, on 8 September 2023. She announced the reissue, The Goddess Edition on 6 March 2024 alongside the release of "Goddess", which appears as the fourth and final bonus track (eighteenth on the album overall). The Goddess Edition was released on 26 April 2024.

== Lyrics and composition ==
When announcing the track, Laufey stated, "Goddess is my most honest song yet. I wrote it alone at my piano after feeling like someone had fallen in love with the version of me they'd seen on stage, just to find that I wasn't what they projected once I was off stage. They deemed me to no longer be a shiny thing when the glamour wore off, reduced to skin and bone". Lyrically, the song is a conversation with a former partner and explores the emotional turmoil associated with being in a relationship with someone who falls in love with the idea of their significant other, rather than the actual person they are. Laufey talks of how her fame and success has become a blinding factor in her relationships, and repeats the lyric "I'm a goddess on stage / Human when we're alone" throughout the song.

== Music video ==
A music video was premiered on 11 April 2024. The video also served as a short film. It was shot in Brooklyn, directed by Celine Song and stars Laufey and English actor and musician Will Gao as a couple whose relationship begins to fracture.

=== Accolades ===
Nominations for "Goddess"
Organisation	Year	Category	Result	Ref.
MTV Video Music Awards	2024	Push Performance of the Year	Nominated	

== Personnel ==
All credits are adapted from Apple Music.

- Laufey - vocals, producer, composition and lyrics
- Spencer Stewart - producer, executive producer
- Steve Kaye - mixing
- Jannick Frampton - mix assistant
- Joe LaPorta - mastering

== Charts ==
Weekly chart performance for "Goddess"
Chart (2024)	Peak position
Iceland (Tónlistinn)	26
New Zealand Hot Singles (RMNZ)	12

== Release history ==
Release history for "Goddess"
Region	Date	Format(s)	Version	Label(s)	Ref.
Various	6 March 2024	Streaming; digital download	Original	Vingolf; AWAL	
Various	1 April 2024	Streaming; digital download	Live (Amazon Music)	Vingolf; AWAL	
