= From the Start =

Single by Laufey

from the album Bewitched
- Released: 11 May 2023
- Genre: Bossa nova; jazz pop
- Length: 2:49
- Label: AWAL
- Songwriters: Laufey; Spencer Stewart
- Producers: Laufey; Spencer Stewart

Laufey singles chronology
"The Christmas Waltz" (2022)	"From the Start" (2023)	"Promise" (2023)

Music video
- "From the Start" on YouTube

"From the Start" is a song by Icelandic singer Laufey. It was released as a single on 11 May 2023 via AWAL.

== Background ==
"From the Start" was released after Laufey's performance with the Iceland Symphony Orchestra, A Night at the Symphony in 2023. Lyrically, the song is about the unrequited love between a protagonist and her best friend, describing it as "a playful mix of old sounds with modern lyrics".

== Commercial performance ==
The song reached 1 million streams in less than 24 hours upon release.

== Covers ==
In 2023, "From the Start" was covered by the band Good Kid, who later incorporated the cover into their extended play Good Kid 4 on 27 March 2024.

In January 2025, Laufey's dance steps from the music video, set to the chorus, were purchasable as a dance move in Fortnite.

On 24 June 2025, Jiandro released a viral TikTok remix of the song called "Confess Your Love", while Spotify released the song on 13 August 2025.

== Charts ==
Weekly chart performance for "From the Start"
Chart (2023–2025)	Peak position
Canada (Canadian Hot 100)	83
Iceland (Tónlistinn)	19
Italy Airplay (EarOne)	63
New Zealand Hot Singles (RMNZ)	8
Singapore Regional (RIAS)	23
UK Singles (Official Charts)	92
UK Independent (Official Charts)	39
US Bubbling Under Hot 100 (Billboard)	1
US Adult Alternative Airplay (Billboard)	34

== Certifications ==
Certifications and sales for "From the Start"
Region	Certification	Certified units/sales
Australia (ARIA)	Platinum	70,000^{‡}
Canada (Music Canada)	Platinum	80,000^{‡}
France (SNEP)	Gold	100,000^{‡}
New Zealand (RMNZ)	Platinum	30,000^{‡}
Spain (Promusicae)	Gold	50,000^{‡}
United Kingdom (BPI)	Gold	400,000^{‡}
United States (RIAA)	3× Platinum	3,000,000^{‡}
^{‡} Sales+streaming figures based on certification alone.

== Release history ==
Release history for "From the Start"
Region	Date	Format(s)	Version(s)	Label	Ref.
Various	11 May 2023	Streaming; digital download	Original	AWAL	
Italy	22 June 2023	Radio airplay	Original	AWAL	
Various	26 July 2023	Streaming; digital download	Sped-up	AWAL	
Various	14 June 2024	Streaming; digital download	String quartet	AWAL	
Various	19 July 2024	Streaming; digital download	Lo-fi	AWAL	
United States	11 November 2024	7-inch vinyl	Original; live	AWAL	
