= A Night at the Symphony =

Live album by Laufey with the Iceland Symphony Orchestra
- Released: 2 March 2023
- Recorded: 26–27 October 2022
- Venue: Harpa Concert Hall
- Length: 50:53
- Languages: English, Icelandic
- Label: AWAL

Laufey chronology
Everything I Know About Love (2022)	A Night at the Symphony (2023)	Bewitched (2023)

Singles from A Night at the Symphony
- 1. "Valentine (Live at the Symphony)" Released: 14 February 2023

A Night at the Symphony is a live album and concert video by Laufey with the Iceland Symphony Orchestra, released on 2 March 2023. With three new cover songs, the musical material is mostly from Laufey's Everything I Know About Love and Typical of Me. It was recorded at Harpa Concert Hall in Reykjavík on 26–27 October 2022.

A Night at the Symphony was released as a double LP as a part of Record Store Day on 20 April 2024, with 4,200 copies pressed in total.

== Track listing ==
A Night at the Symphony track listing
No.	Title	Writer(s)	Length
1.	"Fragile"	Laufey; Spencer Stewart	4:09
2.	"Valentine"	Laufey; Stewart	3:00
3.	"Dear Soulmate"	Laufey; Stewart	4:52
4.	"I Wish You Love"	Léo Chauliac; Charles Trenet; Albert Beach	2:49
5.	"Night Light"	Laufey; Leroy Clampitt	4:07
6.	"Ég Veit þú Kemur"	Oddgeir Kristjánsson; Ási Í Bæ	3:36
7.	"Falling Behind"	Laufey; Stewart	2:55
8.	"Best Friend"	Laufey	2:59
9.	"Like the Movies"	Laufey	3:32
10.	"The Nearness of You"	Hoagy Carmichael; Ned Washington	2:48
11.	"Let You Break My Heart Again"	Laufey	5:02
12.	"What Love Will Do to You"	Laufey; Stewart	3:00
13.	"Beautiful Stranger"	Laufey; Stewart	3:31
14.	"Every Time We Say Goodbye"	Cole Porter	4:33
Total length:			50:53

Notes

- All tracks are noted as "Live at the Symphony".

== Charts ==
=== Weekly charts ===
Weekly chart performance for A Night at the Symphony
Chart (2023–2025)	Peak position
Australian Jazz & Blues Albums (ARIA)	1
French Jazz Albums (SNEP)	17
Icelandic Albums (Tónlistinn)	4
Scottish Albums (OCC)	31
Swedish Jazz Albums (Sverigetopplistan)	9
UK Albums Sales (OCC)	43
UK Independent Albums (OCC)	10
UK Jazz & Blues Albums (OCC)	2
US Classical Albums (Billboard)	2
US Classical Crossover Albums (Billboard)	1
US Jazz Albums (Billboard)	8
US Traditional Jazz Albums (Billboard)	7

=== Year-end charts ===
2024 year-end charts for A Night at the Symphony
Chart (2024)	Position
US Classical Albums (Billboard)	33
US Classical Crossover Albums (Billboard)	9

2025 year-end charts for A Night at the Symphony
Chart (2025)	Position
Australian Jazz & Blues Albums (ARIA)	12
