= Everything I Know About Love (album) =

Studio album by Laufey
- Released: 26 August 2022
- Length: 44:41
- Label: AWAL
- Producers: Laufey; Spencer Stewart; Philip Etherington; Leroy Clampitt; Peter Fenn

Laufey chronology
Typical of Me (2021)	Everything I Know About Love (2022)	A Night at the Symphony (2023)

Singles from Everything I Know About Love
- 1. "Valentine" Released: 14 February 2022; 2. "Everything I Know About Love" Released: 21 April 2022; 3. "Fragile" Released: 1 June 2022; 4. "Dear Soulmate" Released: 6 July 2022; 5. "Falling Behind" Released: 11 August 2022

Everything I Know About Love is the debut studio album by the Icelandic singer-songwriter Laufey, released on 26 August 2022 through AWAL. The deluxe edition was released on 14 October 2022.

Laufey described Everything I Know About Love as a "hopelessly romantic" album of personal growth. She said the songs were based on her experiences, but were written as if they were fiction, and that she tries to create magic out of difficult or bleak moments.

== Background and release ==
Laufey released the first single, "Valentine", on Valentine's Day, 14 February 2022. The second single, "Everything I Know About Love", was released on 21 April, alongside a music video. On 1 June, Laufey announced the album's release date and released its third single, "Fragile", whose music video premiered on 17 June. She released the fourth single, "Dear Soulmate", on 6 July. The fifth single, "Falling Behind", was released on 11 August.

On 22 September 2022, Laufey released the EP The Reykjavík Sessions, containing live acoustic versions of songs from the album. On 22 April 2023, a 12-inch vinyl containing a studio and live performance at Harpa Concert Hall version of "Valentine" was released as part of Record Store Day.

== Critical reception ==
Professional ratings
Aggregate scores
Source	Rating
Metacritic	82/100
Review scores
Source	Rating
AllMusic	4/5 stars
Clash	7/10
Gigwise	9/10 stars
The Line of Best Fit	8/10
NME	4/5 stars

According to the review aggregator Metacritic, Everything I Know About Love received "universal acclaim" based on a weighted average score of 82 out of 100 from 4 critic scores.

Megan Walder of Clash praised the instrumentation, writing: "Every track demonstrates a beauty in the everyday; in the mundane; in our reality. And combining such observations with the sweeping sounds of orchestral talent and acoustic guitar, the end result, of the combination of these juxtaposing complex and simple elements, is one that feels familiar." Writing for AllMusic, Neil Yeung described the album as "a coming-of-age snapshot from an artist in her early twenties, the effort brims with the hopeless romanticism and possibilities of young love and new experiences".

Cordelia Lam of NME praised Laufey's vocals, stating: "What stands out most here is Laufey’s vocal register – her voice is deep and full-bodied, providing a perfect vehicle for the open-hearted sincerity of these songs. She sings with the warm storytelling tone of the jazz greats." The Line of Best Fit's Laura Freyaldenhoven wrote: "Listening to Jónsdóttir’s soulful vocals surrounded by gorgeously sweeping orchestral arrangements, it’s hard not to think of old Hollywood and 1950s Disney. There is something undeniably comforting to a sound that blends old and new – A safe space to dream and wander along the golden rays of intricate harmonies into a grand cinematic ballroom."

== Track listing ==
Everything I Know About Love track listing
No.	Title	Writer(s)	Producer(s)	Length
1.	"Fragile"	Laufey; Spencer Stewart	Laufey; Stewart	4:01
2.	"Beautiful Stranger"	Laufey; Stewart	Laufey; Stewart	3:21
3.	"Valentine"	Laufey; Stewart	Laufey; Stewart	2:48
4.	"Above the Chinese Restaurant"	Laufey; Stewart	Laufey; Stewart; Philip Etherington	3:43
5.	"Dear Soulmate"	Laufey; Stewart	Laufey; Stewart	4:20
6.	"What Love Will Do to You"	Laufey; Stewart	Laufey; Stewart	2:51
7.	"I've Never Been in Love Before"	Frank Loesser	Laufey; Stewart	3:42
8.	"Just Like Chet"	Laufey; Stewart	Laufey; Stewart	3:36
9.	"Everything I Know About Love"	Laufey; Leroy Clampitt; Stewart	Laufey; Clampitt	3:29
10.	"Falling Behind"	Laufey; Stewart	Laufey; Stewart	2:53
11.	"Hi"	Laufey; Stewart	Laufey; Stewart	3:13
12.	"Dance with You Tonight"	Laufey; Peter Fenn	Laufey; Fenn	2:38
13.	"Night Light"	Laufey; Clampitt	Laufey; Clampitt	4:02
Total length:				44:41

Deluxe edition bonus tracks
No.	Title	Writer(s)	Producer(s)	Length
14.	"Slow Down"	Laufey; Fenn; Stewart	Laufey; Fenn	2:25
15.	"Lucky for Me"	Laufey; Fenn; Stewart	Laufey; Fenn	2:24
16.	"Questions for the Universe"	Laufey; Stewart	Laufey; Stewart	3:23
Total length:				52:54

Notes

- The first pressing omits "Valentine" and the instrumental edition excludes "Hi".

== Charts ==
=== Weekly charts ===
Weekly chart performance for Everything I Know About Love
Chart (2022–2026)	Peak position
French Jazz Albums (SNEP)	19
Icelandic Albums (Tónlistinn)	6
Swedish Jazz Albums (Sverigetopplistan)	4
UK Independent Albums (Official Charts)	47
UK Jazz & Blues Albums (Official Charts)	5
US Top Album Sales (Billboard)	50
US Heatseekers Albums (Billboard)	5
US Jazz Albums (Billboard)	3
US Traditional Jazz Albums (Billboard)	3

=== Monthly charts ===
Monthly chart performance for Everything I Know About Love
Chart (2025)	Peak position
German Jazz Albums (Offizielle Top 20)	12

=== Year-end charts ===
2023 year-end charts for Everything I Know About Love
Chart (2023)	Position
Icelandic Albums (Tónlistinn)	59
US Traditional Jazz Albums (Billboard)	23

2024 year-end charts for Everything I Know About Love
Chart (2024)	Position
Icelandic Albums (Tónlistinn)	60
US Jazz Albums (Billboard)	7
US Traditional Jazz Albums (Billboard)	7

2025 year-end charts for Everything I Know About Love
Chart (2025)	Position
Icelandic Albums (Tónlistinn)	95
US Jazz Albums (Billboard)	8
US Traditional Jazz Albums (Billboard)	7

== Certifications and sales ==
Certifications and sales for Everything I Know About Love
Region	Certification	Certified units/sales
Iceland (FHF)	—	1,917
New Zealand (RMNZ)	Gold	7,500^{‡}
United States (RIAA)	Gold	500,000^{‡}
^{‡} Sales+streaming figures based on certification alone.

== Release history ==
Release history for Everything I Know About Love
Region	Date	Format(s)	Edition	Label	Ref.
Various	26 August 2022	Streaming; digital download	Standard	AWAL	
Various	26 August 2022	Streaming; digital download	Instrumental	AWAL	
Various	16 September 2022	LP	First pressing	AWAL	
Various	14 October 2022	Streaming; digital download	Deluxe	AWAL	
Various	10 March 2023	LP	Standard	AWAL	
Various	19 January 2024	CD	Standard	AWAL	
