= Typical of Me =

EP by Laufey
- Released: 30 April 2021
- Length: 20:58
- Labels: Self-published; AWAL
- Producers: Davin Kingston; Dillan Witherow; Gabríel Ólafs; Max Margolis

Laufey chronology
Typical of Me (2021)	Everything I Know About Love (2022)

Singles from Typical of Me
- 1. "Street by Street" Released: 6 April 2020; 2. "Someone New" Released: 25 May 2020; 3. "Best Friend" Released: 3 March 2021; 4. "Magnolia" Released: 7 April 2021

Typical of Me is the debut extended play (EP) by Icelandic singer-songwriter Laufey, released on 30 April 2021. It was self-published by Laufey and later released on 12-inch vinyl through AWAL. Many of the songs on the EP were written by her in the Berklee College of Music dorm room, with the goal of making jazz more accessible. Typical of Me was predominantly produced by Laufey's classmate Davin Kingston. The material was mainly promoted on Laufey's social media in 2020–21.

== Background and release ==
On 6 April 2020, Laufey released her debut single, "Street by Street", which charted at number one on Icelandic Radio. In the following months, she released "Someone New" and posted several cover songs and voice memos on her YouTube channel. On 23 June 2020, Laufey participated in the #BerkleeAnywhere concert series performing her previous singles and "I Wish You Love". The latter's recording would later be recommended and praised by Rolling Stone.

Laufey released the third single, "Best Friend", on 3 March 2021. Its music video premiered on 17 March, and in November of the same year, it was performed in Place Saint-Sulpice for La Blogothèque's A Take Away Show. "Magnolia", the fourth single, was released on 7 April; its music video premiered on 12 May. This song was performed at the Kennedy Center with the National Symphony Orchestra as part of Ben Folds's Declassified series on 12 April 2024.

Including the four singles and three other songs, many of which were written in her college dorm room, Typical of Me was released on 30 April 2021, the year Laufey graduated from Berklee College of Music. The track "Like the Movies" has been performed several times, including on The Reykjavík Grapevine's Grapevine Grassroots and Jimmy Kimmel Live! – Laufey's United States network television debut. It was also part of a live performance in the KEXP gathering space, recorded on 15 October 2021 along with "Let You Break My Heart Again", "Street by Street" and "Best Friend".

== Critical reception ==
Typical of Me received attention from musicians such as Billie Eilish and Willow Smith, being praised by some music critics. In a four-star review, Neil Yeung of AllMusic wrote that "every song on Typical of Me is a gem, brimming with potential." American Songwriter's Anna D'Amico ranked the EP third on her list of best albums of 2021.

== Track listing ==
All tracks are written by Laufey, except "I Wish You Love" (written by Léo Chauliac, Charles Trenet, and Albert Beach). All tracks, excluding ones noted, are produced by Davin Kingston.

Typical of Me track listing
No.	Title	Producer(s)	Length
1.	"Street by Street"		3:44
2.	"Magnolia"	Dillan Witherow	3:00
3.	"Like the Movies"		2:42
4.	"I Wish You Love"	Davin Kingston; Gabríel Ólafs	2:35
5.	"James"		2:55
6.	"Someone New"		3:18
7.	"Best Friend"	Kingston; Max Margolis	2:44
Total length:			20:58

== Charts ==
=== Weekly charts ===
Weekly chart performance
Chart (2023–2025)	Peak position
Icelandic Albums (Tónlistinn)	12
Scottish Albums (Official Charts)	86
Swedish Jazz Albums (Sverigetopplistan)	16
UK Independent Albums (Official Charts)	42
UK Jazz & Blues Albums (Official Charts)	7
US Top Album Sales (Billboard)	72
US Jazz Albums (Billboard)	2
US Traditional Jazz Albums (Billboard)	2

=== Year-end charts ===
2023 year-end charts
Chart (2023)	Position
US Traditional Jazz Albums (Billboard)	24

2024 year-end charts
Chart (2024)	Position
US Jazz Albums (Billboard)	14
US Traditional Jazz Albums (Billboard)	12

2025 year-end charts
Chart (2025)	Position
US Jazz Albums (Billboard)	18
US Traditional Jazz Albums (Billboard)	16

== Release history ==
Release dates and formats
Region	Date	Format(s)	Edition	Label	Ref.
Various	30 April 2021	Digital download; streaming	Standard	Self-published	
Various	30 April 2021	Digital download; streaming	Instrumental	Self-published	
Various	6 October 2023	12-inch vinyl	Standard	AWAL	
Various	3 May 2024	12-inch vinyl	Alternative	AWAL	
