= Laufey (singer) =

Icelandic singer (born 1999)

Laufey OTF
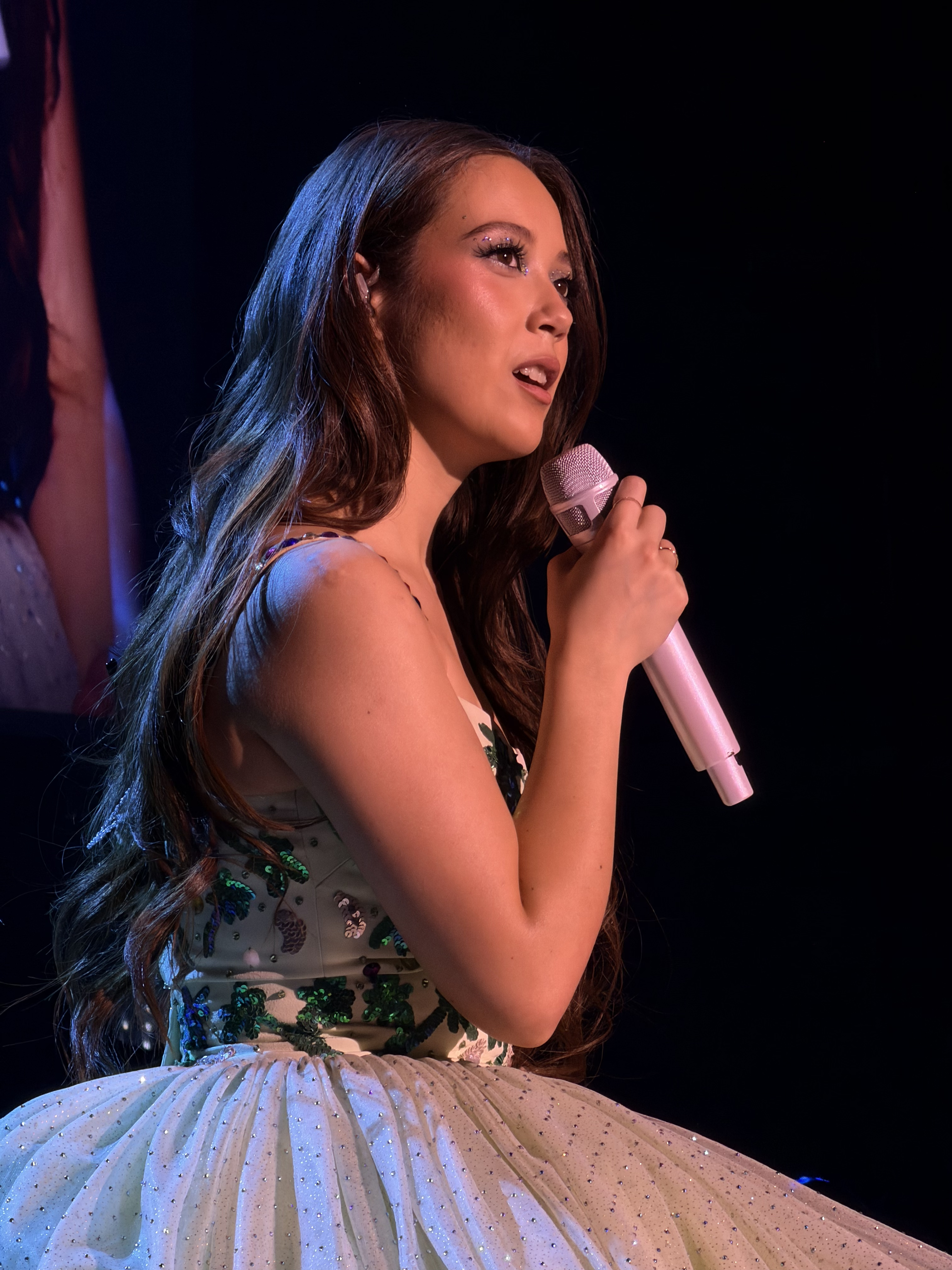
- Laufey at the Wiener Stadthalle in 2026

Background information
- Born: Laufey Lín Bing Jónsdóttir; 23 April 1999 (age 27); Reykjavík, Iceland
- Education: Reykjavík College of Music; Berklee College of Music (BMus)
- Genres: Jazz pop; traditional pop; classical
- Occupations: Singer-songwriter; writer; record producer
- Instruments: Vocals; piano; guitar; cello
- Works: Discography
- Years active: 2020–present
- Labels: AWAL; Interscope; Verve; Vingolf
- Website: www.laufeymusic.com

Chinese name
- Chinese: 林冰
Transcriptions
Standard Mandarin
- Hanyu Pinyin: Lín Bīng
- Bopomofo: ㄌㄧㄣˊㄅㄧㄥ
- IPA: [lǐn píŋ]
Wu
- Wugniu: lin^{2} pin^{1}
- IPA: Shanghainese: [lin˩ pin˦]
Yue: Cantonese
- Yale Romanization: Làhm Bīng
- Jyutping: Lam4 Bing1
- IPA: [lɐm˩ pɪŋ˥]

Laufey Lín Bing Jónsdóttir (Icelandic: [ˈlœyːvei ˈliːn ˈpiŋk ˈjounsˌtouhtɪr̥]; Chinese: 林冰; pinyin: Lín Bīng; born 23 April 1999), known mononymously as Laufey (English: /ˈleɪveɪ/ LAY-vay), is an Icelandic singer-songwriter. Her musical style blends genres such as jazz pop and classical music. Laufey began performing as a cello soloist with the Iceland Symphony Orchestra at age 15. She then emerged as a finalist in the 2014 edition of Ísland Got Talent (Iceland's edition of Got Talent) and a semifinalist on The Voice Iceland in 2015. She released her debut single "Street by Street" in April of 2020.

In 2021, Laufey released her debut EP, Typical of Me, and graduated from the Berklee College of Music in Boston. In 2022, she released her debut album, Everything I Know About Love, which appeared in multiple Icelandic and United States charts. Her second album, Bewitched (2023), won Best Traditional Pop Vocal Album at the 66th Annual Grammy Awards (2024) and produced the hit single "From the Start". Her third and latest album, A Matter of Time, was released on 22 August 2025. It won Best Traditional Pop Vocal Album at the 68th Annual Grammy Awards.

== Early life and education ==
Laufey Lín Bing Jónsdóttir was born on 23 April 1999 in Reykjavík, Iceland. Her father is from Iceland and her mother is from Guangzhou, China. Her mother is a classical violinist and is the daughter of Lin Yaoji, a violin educator at the Central Conservatory of Music in China, which Laufey credits as inspiring her love of music. Her father is a finance executive. She has an identical twin sister, Júnía Lín Hua Jónsdóttir (Icelandic: [ˈjuːnia ˈliːn ˈxʷaː ˈjounsˌtouhtɪr̥]; Chinese: 林華; pinyin: Lín Huá), who is a violinist and serves as her creative director.

She and her family lived in Washington, D.C., for two years and then moved back to Reykjavík in 2008, where she studied at Álftamýrarskóli. Laufey started learning the piano at age four and the cello at age eight. She grew up doing ballet and figure skating. Laufey speaks Icelandic, English, and Mandarin Chinese, which was the first language she learned. She also learned to read Danish after studying it for seven years. She graduated from the Reykjavík College of Music in 2018, where she also studied singing. She spent her childhood moving between Reykjavík and Washington, D.C., as well as visiting Beijing.

At age 15, Laufey performed as a cello soloist with the Iceland Symphony Orchestra. While in Iceland, she participated in the 2014 edition of Ísland Got Talent—the Icelandic version of Got Talent—where she ended as a finalist. In 2015 she also appeared as a contestant on The Voice Iceland and reached the semifinals. At the time, she was the youngest competitor in the series' history.

After high school, Laufey and her sister were both accepted by the University of St Andrews in Scotland, and she intended to study economics. Her sister graduated from St Andrews with a degree in international relations, while Laufey attended Berklee College of Music instead after receiving a presidential scholarship. There, she studied cello with Mike Block and graduated in 2021. After graduating from Berklee College of Music in 2021, she began pursuing a professional music career. As of October 2023, she resided in Los Angeles.

== Career ==
=== 2020–2022: Early career ===
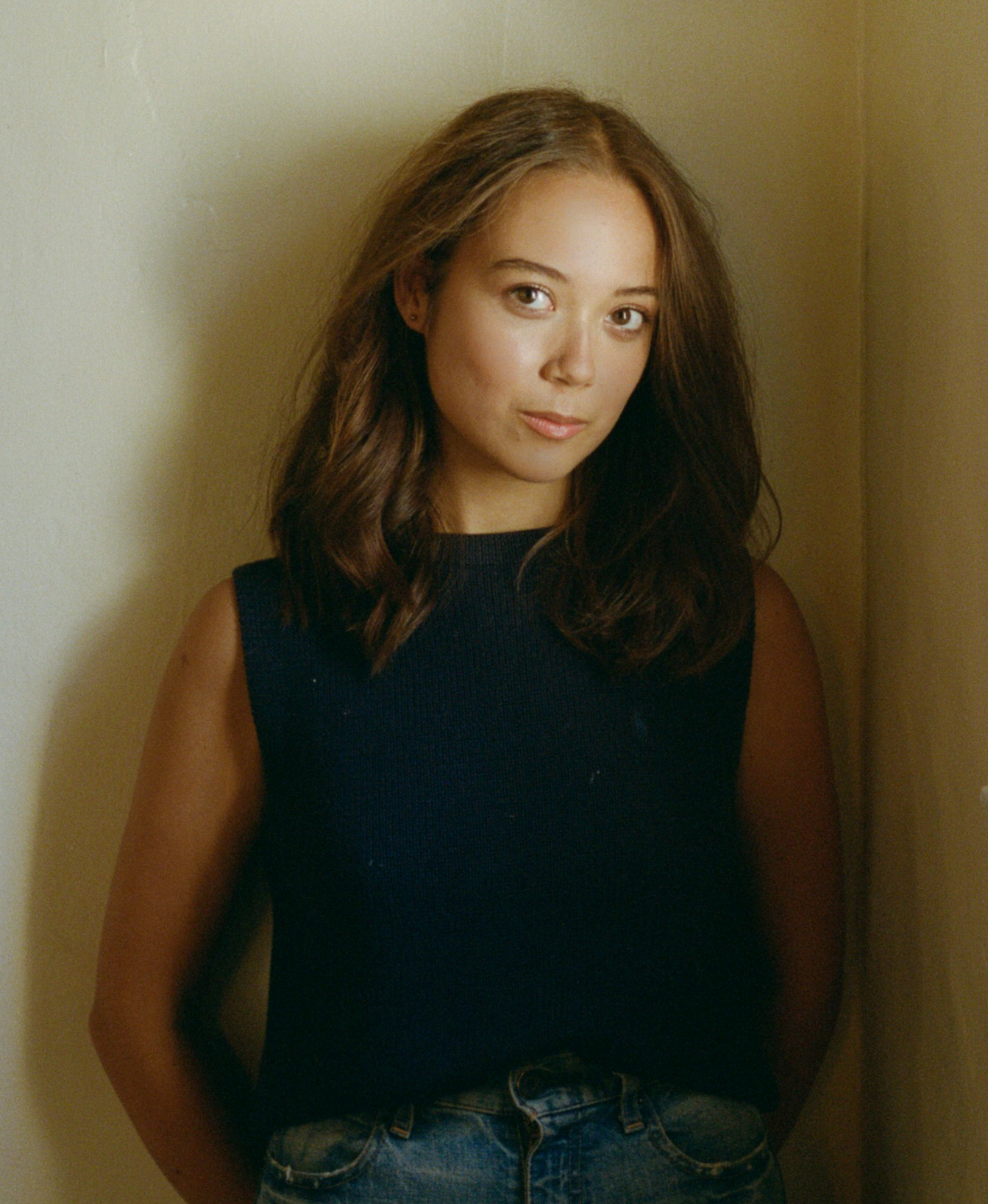
Laufey in 2021

On 6 April 2020, Laufey released her debut single, "Street by Street", which charted at number one on Icelandic Radio. She then launched her first EP, Typical of Me, which she called her "little baby", on 30 April 2021. It includes "Street by Street" and six other songs, many written in her college dorm room. Rolling Stone particularly praised her rendition of "I Wish You Love". American Songwriter included the EP in its list of best albums of 2021. Typical of Me received attention from musicians such as Billie Eilish. Laufey also posted covers of jazz standards on TikTok, which The New York Times called "casually elegant". She signed a record deal with AWAL, a label that typically allows artists to retain greater control of their intellectual property.

The same year, Laufey hosted a weekly music show on BBC Radio 3 during spring and summer (and again in December for a Christmas special) called Happy Harmonies, on which she highlighted uplifting music in a wide variety of genres. In November, she performed at the London Jazz Festival. Around the same time, she collaborated with the Philharmonia Orchestra to release her song "Let You Break My Heart Again". In December, she collaborated with singer Dodie to release another single, "Love To Keep Me Warm", their cover of "Winter Weather" by Ted Shapiro, with a bridge section by Laufey and Dodie.

Laufey made her US network television debut in 2022, appearing as the musical guest on Jimmy Kimmel Live! on 21 January; she played her song "Like the Movies" from Typical of Me. Her debut album, Everything I Know About Love, was released on 26 August 2022 via AWAL to critical acclaim. On Billboard's Alternative New Artist Album chart, the album peaked at number one on its debut.

=== 2023–present: Bewitched and A Matter of Time ===
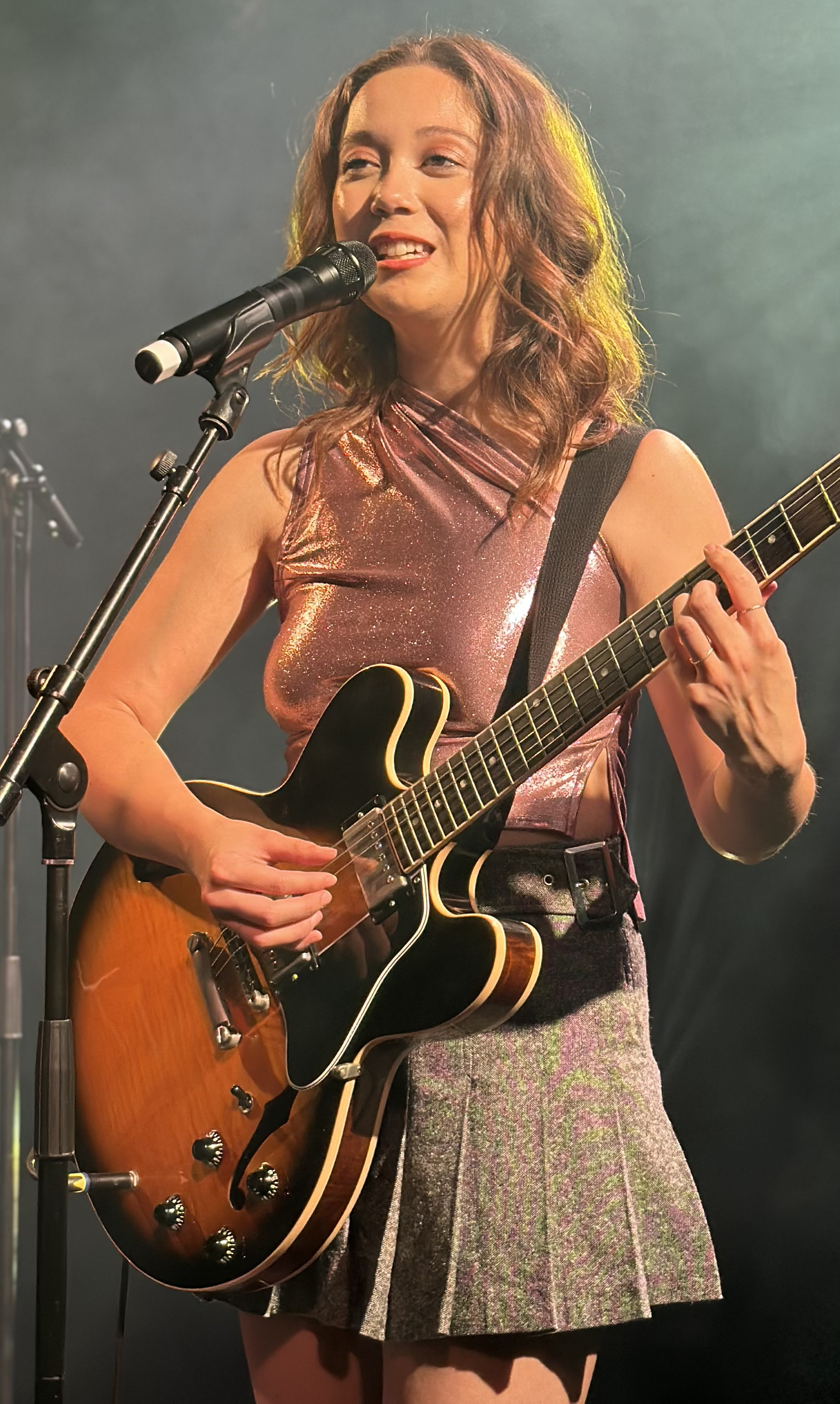
Laufey performing at the Montreux Jazz Festival in July 2023

In August 2023, it was announced that Laufey had signed a global publishing deal with Warner Chappell Music (WCM). Her second album, Bewitched, was released on 8 September 2023. A week before the release, she leaked the sheet music for fans to be able to pre-save the album. It was met with critical acclaim and garnered Laufey's first Grammy Award, for Best Traditional Pop Vocal Album at the 66th Annual Grammy Awards, where she performed with Billy Joel on his closing number, "Turn the Lights Back On". Laufey went on a year-long world tour to support the album. On 6 March 2024, she reissued the album as Bewitched: The Goddess Edition, which was preceded by the single "Goddess".

She announced her third album in 2025 with the release of its first single "Silver Lining" on 3 April. Laufey later revealed the album's name, A Matter of Time. She later released the second single, "Tough Luck", on 15 May 2025. On 25 June 2025, she teased and released her third and most popular single from the album, "Lover Girl", accompanied by a video. The video for "Snow White" was released on 7 August, with the song serving as a fourth single and buildup for the album's release.

The album was then released on 22 August 2025. After its release, Laufey later started her A Matter of Time Tour, with her first concert at the Kia Center in Orlando, Florida on 15 September 2025. In September 2025, Laufey was announced as a performer at Coachella 2026, her second performance at the annual festival.

In February 2026, Laufey left talent agency Wasserman; no reason was given publicly, although The Hollywood Reporter noted then-recent controversy over founder Casey Wasserman's name being discovered in the Epstein files. That month, she announced an extended version of her latest album, titled A Matter of Time: The Final Hour, and its lead single "How I Get". To promote the deluxe release on 15 April, Laufey was announced as the headliner for Season 14 of Fortnite Festival with in-game cosmetics and selected songs being added to the game. A concert experience, Laufey: The Final Hour was also published in Fortnite featuring "Madwoman", "Lover Girl", and "Too Little Too Late". In July 2026, it was announced that Laufey had signed with United Talent Agency. In September 2026, it was announced that she had signed with Interscope Records and Verve Records, both under Universal Music Group.

== Public image ==
=== Influences and music style ===
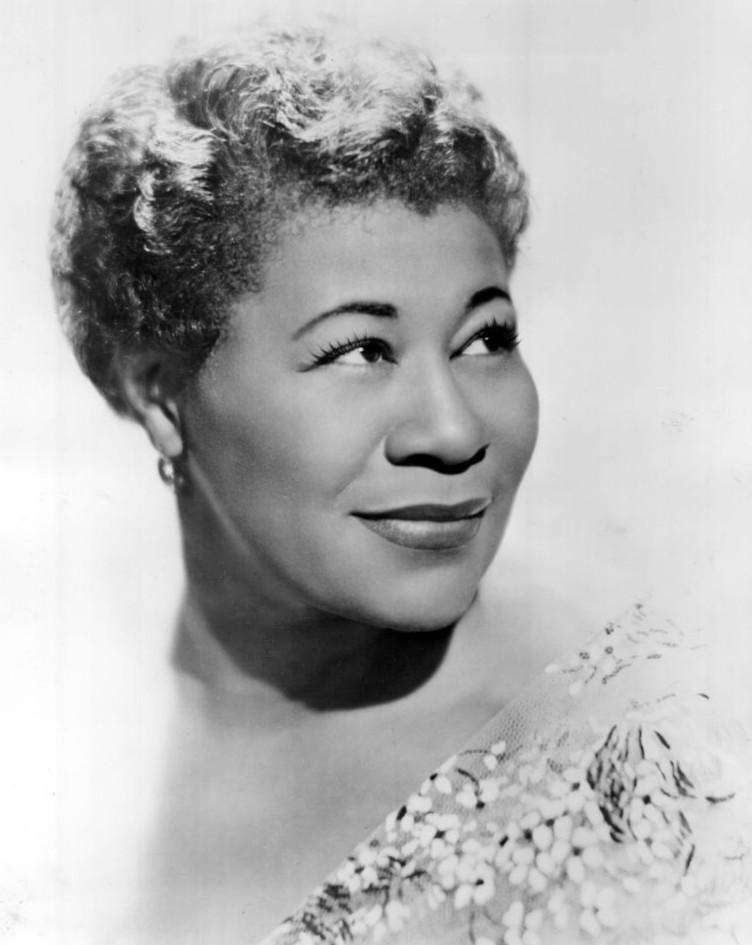
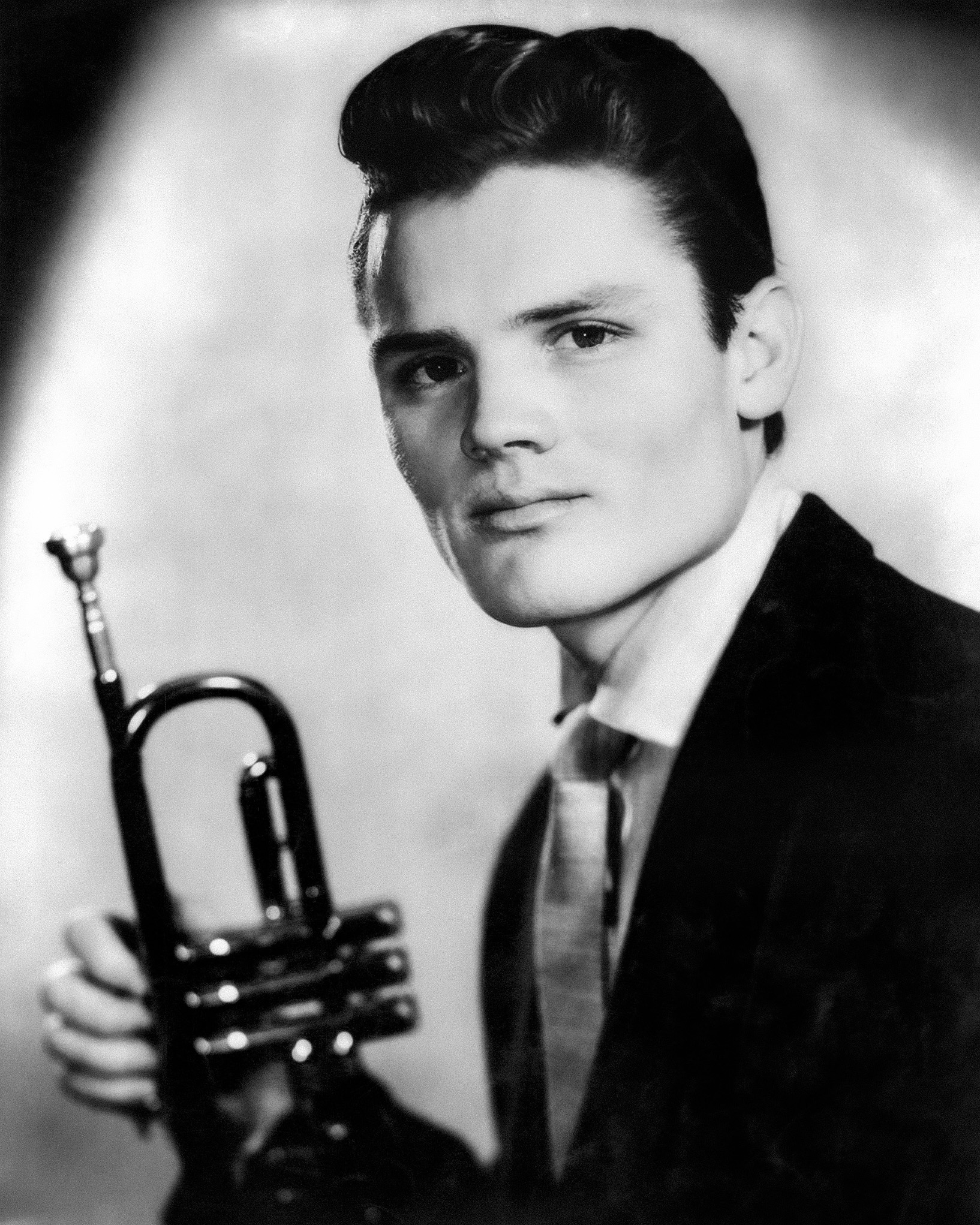
Laufey has cited Ella Fitzgerald and Chet Baker as her main musical influences.

Laufey was influenced by classical music, including Frédéric Chopin, and played it from an early age, but turned to her father's records of jazz musicians such as Ella Fitzgerald and Billie Holiday to develop her musical style. She has cited Fitzgerald and Chet Baker as her biggest artistic influences, calling the former her favourite musician. Laufey has also cited Taylor Swift, Norah Jones, and Adele as inspirations; she said, "Swift has done for pop and country what I hope to do for jazz. She has managed to unite people across the world, which is one of my main goals as a musician."

The genre of Laufey's music has been debated. She calls it jazz or jazz pop, while organisations such as National Public Radio, the New York Times, and The Sydney Morning Herald have noted that her music includes elements of jazz, pop, bossa nova, and classical, describing the entirety as traditional pop or old-time pop due to the blend of styles. Vocally, she has been described as a contralto, with Katie Hawthorne of The Guardian describing her voice as "unusual" and "honeyed".

=== Critical reception ===
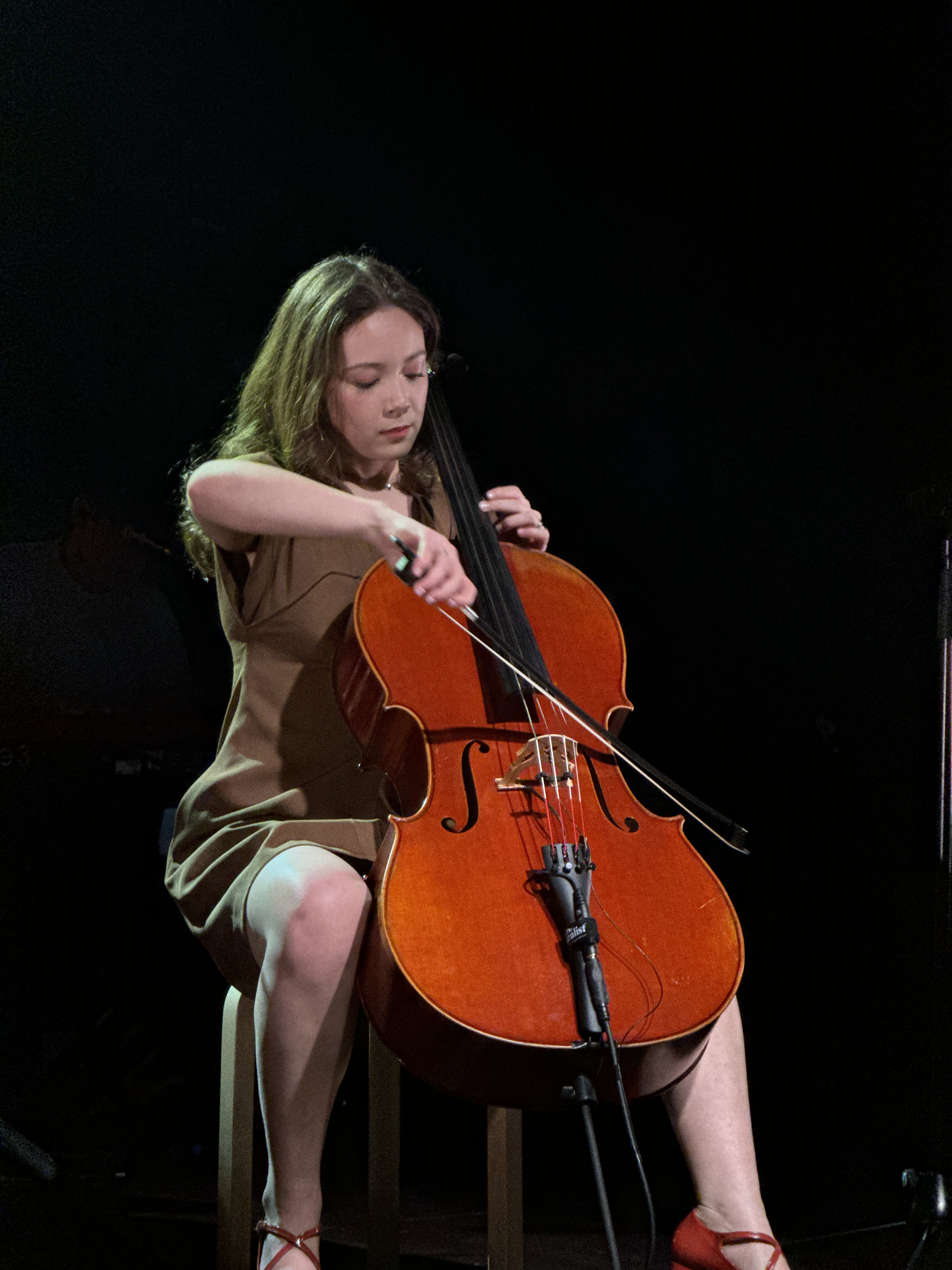
Laufey performing in Belgium, February 2024

Many critics, such as Maura Judkis, an editor at the Washington Post, and editor Murray Stassen from Music Business Worldwide noted that Laufey is "bringing back" jazz to Gen Z, as the genre has largely declined commercially and has received less recognition than other genres compared to its heyday. In a 2023 article, music journalist Michael Dwyer of The Sydney Morning Herald called Laufey a "TikTok jazz ambassador". Organisations such as Billboard and National Public Radio opined that Laufey created a blueprint for the success of jazz in the music industry today, helping push the genre back into the mainstream.

Her second album, Bewitched, received critical praise for its composition and her take on jazz. The album received a score of 83 out of 100 on review aggregator Metacritic based on six critics' reviews. For Grammys.com, Morgan Enos wrote that Bewitched's success shows Laufey has left "jazz neophytes spellbound".

She was named one of Time's Women of the Year for 2025. She also made it to the Madame Tussauds Hot 100 list for 2025. In January 2026, she was awarded the Knight's Cross of the Order of the Falcon by the President of Iceland for her contribution to music.

=== Fashion ===
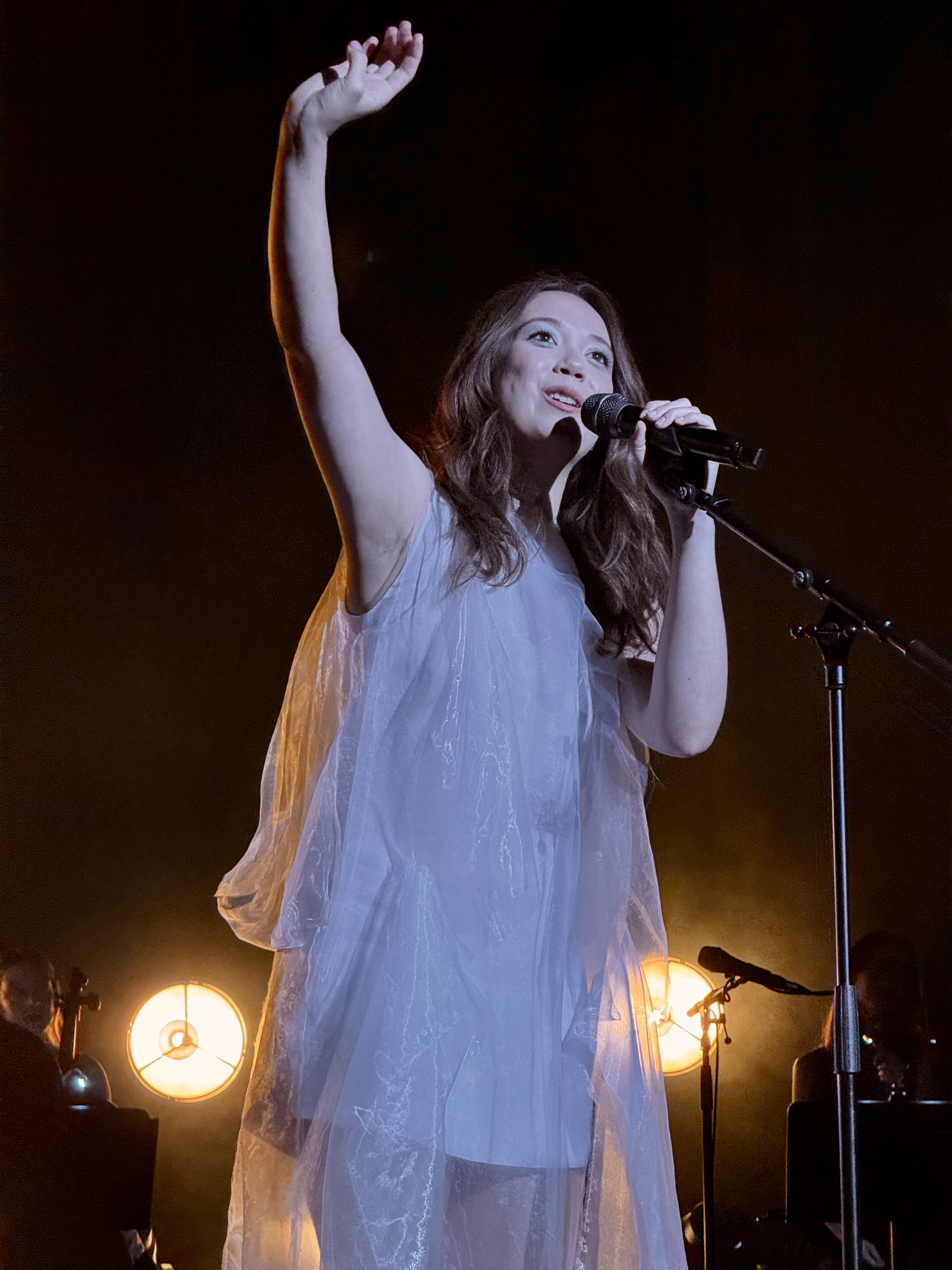
Laufey performing in the United Kingdom, May 2024

Laufey's style has been viewed as an extension of her music, harkening back to the time periods that influenced her music most through embracing romantic, classically feminine and vintage-inspired garments. It mixes elements such as bows, lace, ruffles, pastel colors, and bright metallic elements. Her aesthetic has been dubbed Laufeycore, described by Teen Vogue as "hyperfeminine, ethereal style". On stage, she frequently wears voluminous, vintage-inspired dresses with Repetto Mary Jane heels or ballet flats. The South China Morning Post has called her fashion style an "extension to her music", with her stage attire being said to fit the venue's atmosphere. Likewise, Coveteur described her style as like her music, characterising it as "vintage, overtly feminine, and very sweet". Laufey described her own looks as "a mix of French and Scandinavian style".

In September 2025, Laufey collaborated with the American clothing retailer Everlane for its "Laufey in Everland" campaign, marking the brand's first talent-led fashion campaign.

== Discography ==
Studio albums

- Everything I Know About Love (2022)
- Bewitched (2023)
- A Matter of Time (2025)

== Awards and nominations ==
Award	Year	Work	Category	Result	Ref.
ASCAP Pop Music Awards	2026	Herself	Creative Voice Award	Won	
Billboard Women in Music	2026	Herself	Innovator Award	Won	
Gold Gala	2025	Herself	Billboard Gold Music Honor	Won	
Grammy Awards	2024	Bewitched	Best Traditional Pop Vocal Album	Won	
Grammy Awards	2026	A Matter of Time	Best Traditional Pop Vocal Album	Won	
Grammy Awards	2027	"Madwoman"	Best Traditional Pop Vocal Performance	Pending	
Icelandic Music Awards	2024	Herself	Pop, Rock, Hip Hop, and Electronic Performer of the Year	Won	
Icelandic Music Awards	2024	Herself	Pop, Rock, Hip Hop, and Electronic Vocal Performance of the Year	Won	
Icelandic Music Awards	2025	Herself	Most Popular Music of the Year	Won	
Icelandic Music Awards	2026	A Matter of Time	Pop Album of the Year	Won	
Icelandic Music Awards	2026	Herself	Pop, Rock, Hip Hop, and Electronic Performer of the Year	Won	
Icelandic Music Awards	2026	Herself	Pop, Rock, Hip Hop, and Electronic Vocal Performance of the Year	Won	
Icelandic Music Awards	2026	"Lover Girl"	Pop Song and Composition of the Year	Nominated	
Icelandic Optimism Award	2024	Herself	Honorary Award	Won	
MTV Europe Music Awards	2024	Herself	Best Nordic Act	Nominated	
MTV Europe Music Awards	2024	Herself	Best Push Act	Nominated	
MTV Video Music Awards	2024	"Goddess"	Push Performance of the Year	Nominated	
Order of the Falcon	2026	Herself	Knight's Cross	Conferred	
Pollstar Awards	2026	Herself	New Headliner of the Year	Nominated	
President's Export Prize	2024	Herself	Honorary Award	Won	
The Reykjavík Grapevine Music Awards	2024	Herself	Artist of the Year	Won	
Variety Hitmakers Awards	2024	Herself	Crossover Artist of the Year	Won	

== Tours ==
Headlining

- Everything I Know About Love Tour (2022)
- Bewitched Tour (2023–2024)
- A Matter of Time Tour (2025–2026)

== Bibliography ==
Books

- Mei Mei the Bunny (2026)
