= Live at the Hollywood Bowl =

Many artists have released video and audio records of their live performance at the Hollywood Bowl, an amphitheater in Los Angeles:

- The Beatles at the Hollywood Bowl, a 1977 album by the Beatles, recorded in 1964 and 1965, re-released in 2016 as Live at the Hollywood Bowl
- Monty Python Live at the Hollywood Bowl, a 1982 concert film by the Monty Python team
- Live at the Hollywood Bowl (The Doors album), an album released in 1987 from the Doors' performance on July 5, 1968
- Mario Lanza Live at Hollywood Bowl: Historical Recordings (1947 & 1951), a 2000 CD that includes the six selections that tenor Mario Lanza sang at his first Hollywood Bowl concert in August, 1947
- Live at the Hollywood Bowl (Ben Harper film), a DVD documenting a performance by Ben Harper & the Innocent Criminals on August 4, 2003
- Morrissey: Live at the Hollywood Bowl, a DVD documenting a performance by Morrissey on June 8, 2007
- Astral Weeks Live at the Hollywood Bowl, a 2009 CD from two concert performances by Van Morrison on November 7 & 8, 2008
  - Astral Weeks Live at the Hollywood Bowl: The Concert Film, a 2009 DVD release of the same concert performance
- An Evening of Magic, Live at the Hollywood Bowl, a 1979 album by Chuck Mangione
- Live at the Hollywood Bowl (Dave Matthews Band album), 2019
- Amidst the Chaos: Live from the Hollywood Bowl, an album by Sara Bareilles, 2021
- A Night at the Symphony: Hollywood Bowl, an album by Laufey and Los Angeles Philharmonic is a studio recording of their performance at the Hollywood Bowl. The track consists of 15 songs, from the following albums, EPs and singles: Bewitched, Everything I Know About Love, Typical of Me, Let You Break My Heart Again. The studio album was recorded in 2024.
