= House at 574 Bellefontaine St. =

Historic house in California, United States

- U.S. National Register of Historic Places
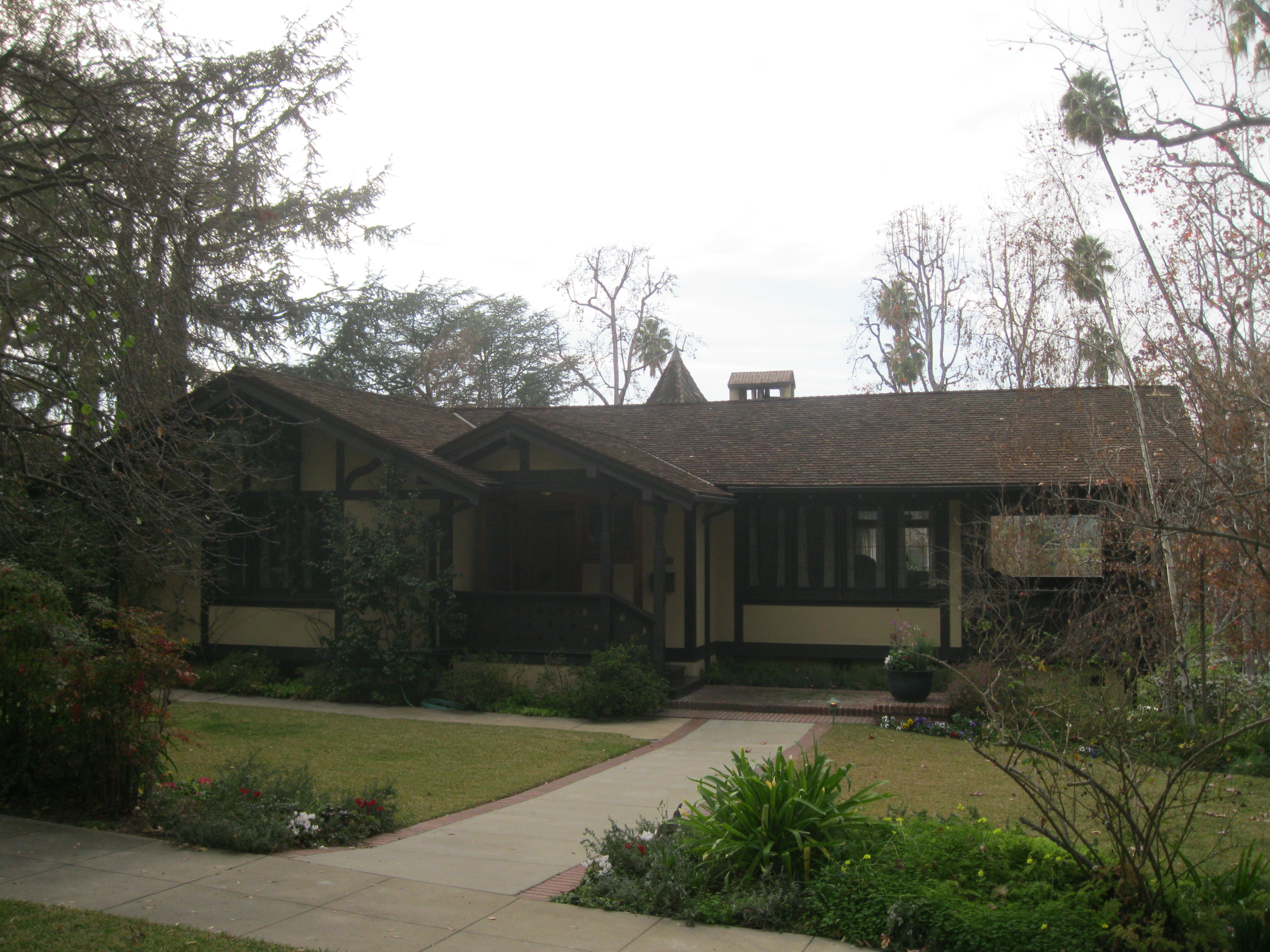

- Location within the Los Angeles metropolitan area Location within California Location within the United States
- Location: 574 Bellefontaine St., Pasadena, California
- Coordinates: 34°7′53″N 118°9′45″W
- Area: less than one acre
- Built: 1911
- Architect: Marston, Sylvanus B.
- Architectural style: Swiss Chalet
- MPS: Residential Architecture of Pasadena: Influence of the Arts and Crafts Movement
- NRHP reference No.: 98000958
- Added to NRHP: August 6, 1998

The House at 574 Bellefontaine St. is a historic house located at 574 Bellefontaine Street in Pasadena, California. Architect Sylvanus B. Marston of Marston, Van Pelt & Maybury designed the Swiss chalet style house, which was built in 1911 for developer G. Roscoe Thomas. The two-story house is built on a steep hill and has an L-shaped layout; the main entrance is located on the north side's second story. The front facade includes a large gable on the south side and a smaller one over the entrance porch; the larger gable features half-timbered woodwork. A stair tower at the back of the main corner has a pointed roof and an adjacent chimney stack. The north leg of the house has a second-story porch in the rear, while the west leg features arched windows and doors on the first floor and casement windows on the second.

The house was added to the National Register of Historic Places on August 6, 1998.
