= Villa Verde (Pasadena, California) =

Historic house in California, United States

- U.S. National Register of Historic Places
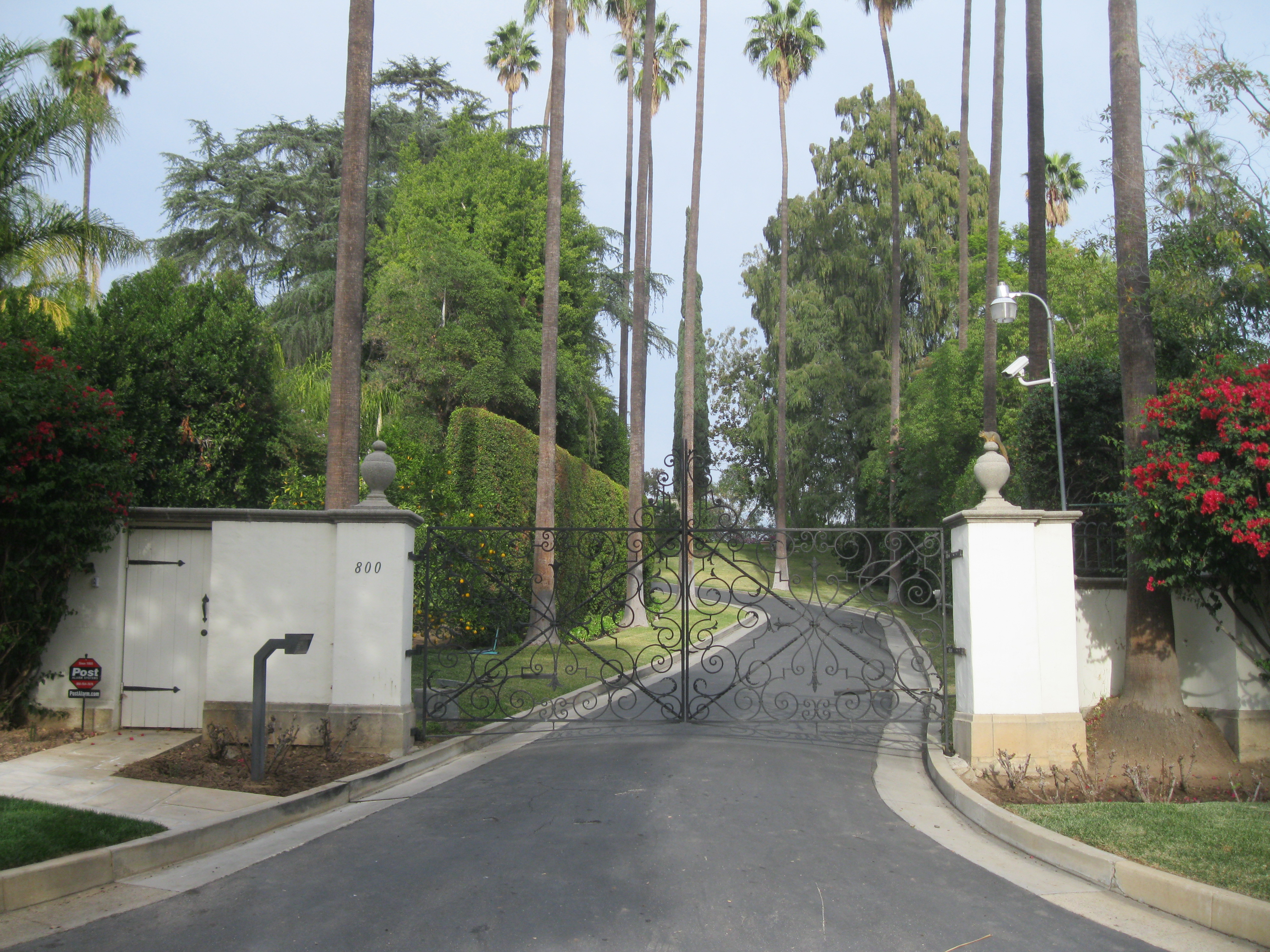
- The front gate of Villa Verde

- Location within the Los Angeles metropolitan area Location within California Location within the United States
- Location: 800 S. San Rafael, Pasadena, California
- Coordinates: 34°7′52″N 118°9′43″W
- Area: 1.8 acres (0.73 ha)
- Built: 1927
- Built by: R. Wescott Company
- Architect: Marston, Van Pelt & Maybury
- Architectural style: Spanish Colonial Revival
- NRHP reference No.: 84000896
- Added to NRHP: September 13, 1984

Villa Verde, located at 800 S. San Rafael in Pasadena, California, is a historic estate built in 1927. The estate was designed by Marston, Van Pelt & Maybury and is representative of their Spanish Colonial Revival designs. The design features extensive wrought iron ornamentation and a terra cotta roof. F. A. Hardy, former chairman of the Goodrich Corporation and a renowned horticulturist, first inhabited the house and planted its still-surviving garden.

The estate was listed on the National Register of Historic Places in 1984. The listing included two contributing buildings on 1.8 acres (0.73 ha).
