= Royal Laundry Complex =

- U.S. National Register of Historic Places
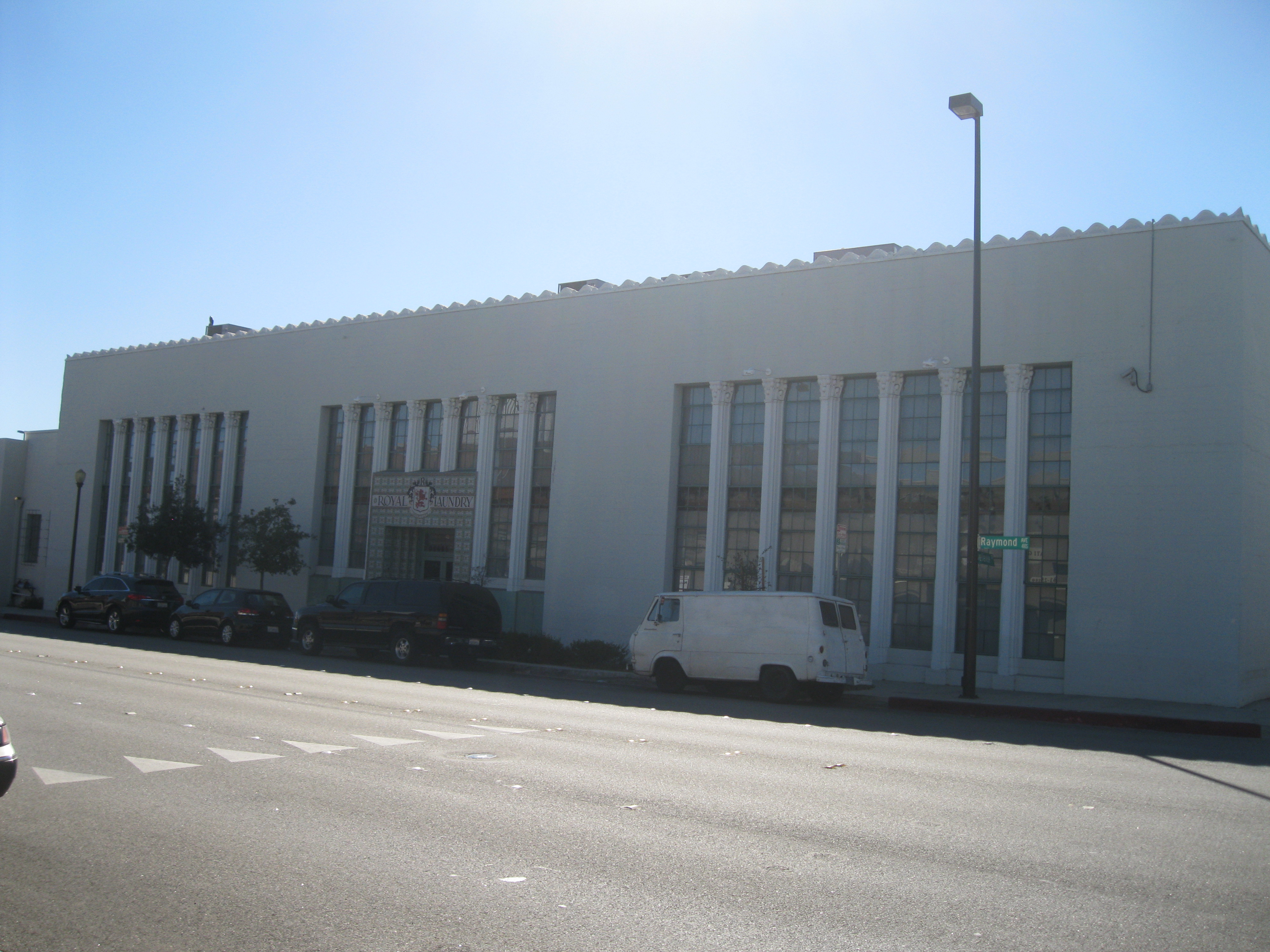

- Location within the Los Angeles metropolitan area Location within California Location within the United States
- Location: 443 S. Raymond Avenue, Pasadena, California, U.S.
- Coordinates: 34°8′17″N 118°8′54″W
- Area: 1.9 acres (0.77 ha)
- Built: 1927
- Architect: Kaufmann, Gordon B.
- Architectural style: Spanish Colonial Revival, Streamline Moderne
- NRHP reference No.: 07000996
- Added to NRHP: September 27, 2007

The Royal Laundry Complex is a historic laundry plant located at 443 S. Raymond Avenue in Pasadena, California, United States, consisting of close to 72,500-square-foot. Gordon Kaufmann, a prominent architect who also designed the Hoover Dam and several buildings at the California Institute of Technology, designed the plant. Kaufman's Spanish Colonial Revival design for the plant signified a shift in his style to include modern elements, which ultimately came to dominate his work. The complex currently serves as the world headquarters of Bluebeam, Inc. and was formerly the company headquarters of the Disney Store.

== History ==
The site's main plant was constructed in 1927 for the Royal Laundry Company, a laundry service founded in 1910. The plant's south annex, a Streamline Moderne building topped by a pylon, was added to the complex around 1930. An additional building providing drive-up service was constructed in 1939, an adaptation to the rise of the automobile; this building was topped by an overhead sign advertising the business in 1955. The laundry complex, which is located in an industrial neighborhood of Pasadena, has been described as one of the most architecturally significant industrial buildings in the city. The Royal Laundry ceased operations in 1980s and became a vacant property.

A parking ramp was built in 2005 with four stories with capacity for 225 cars. The complex interior was converted to corporate office space by October 2008 by Clive Wilkinson Architects.

Hoops Retail Stores, DBA Disney Store and a subsidiary of Children's Place, commenced a 13-year lease of the building in 2006. The complex was added to the National Register of Historic Places on September 27, 2007. Disney Consumer Products took over Disney Stores back from a bankrupt Hoops Retail on May 1, 2008 but maintained its headquarters here.

In 2012, Karlin Real Estate, a West L.A. real estate investment company, purchased the complex for $19.3 million only to place back up for sale in mid-February 2014. In late August, the complex was sold to Swig Co., a San Francisco real estate investment company. In mid-November 2018, the Disney Stores USA headquarters moved out of the complex to Disney's secondary headquarters, Grand Central Creative Campus.

Since April 2019, it is the headquarters of Bluebeam Inc.

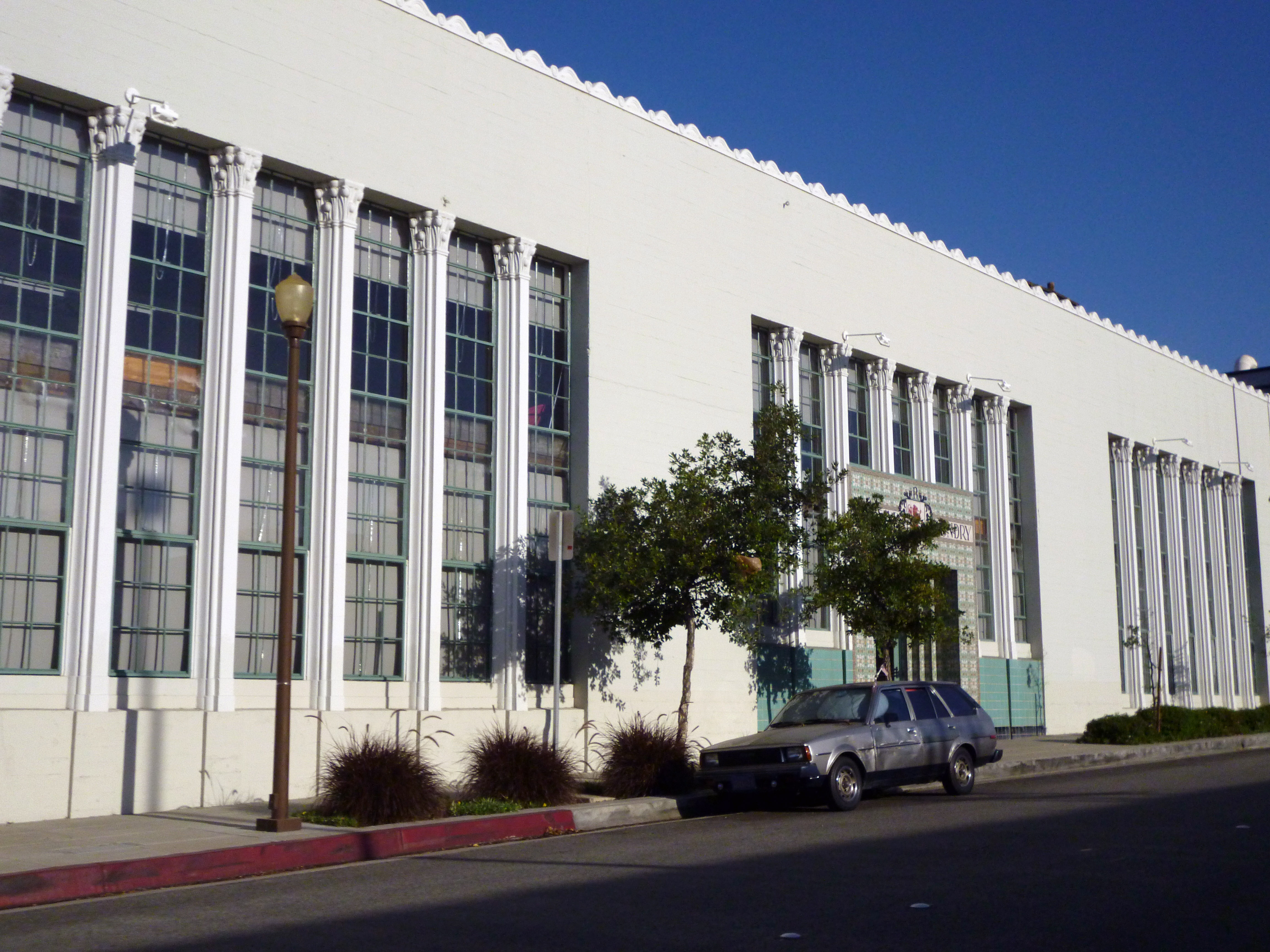
443 S. Raymond Avenue

== See also ==
- Home Laundry: another laundry on the NRHP in Pasadena
