= Home Laundry =

- U.S. National Register of Historic Places
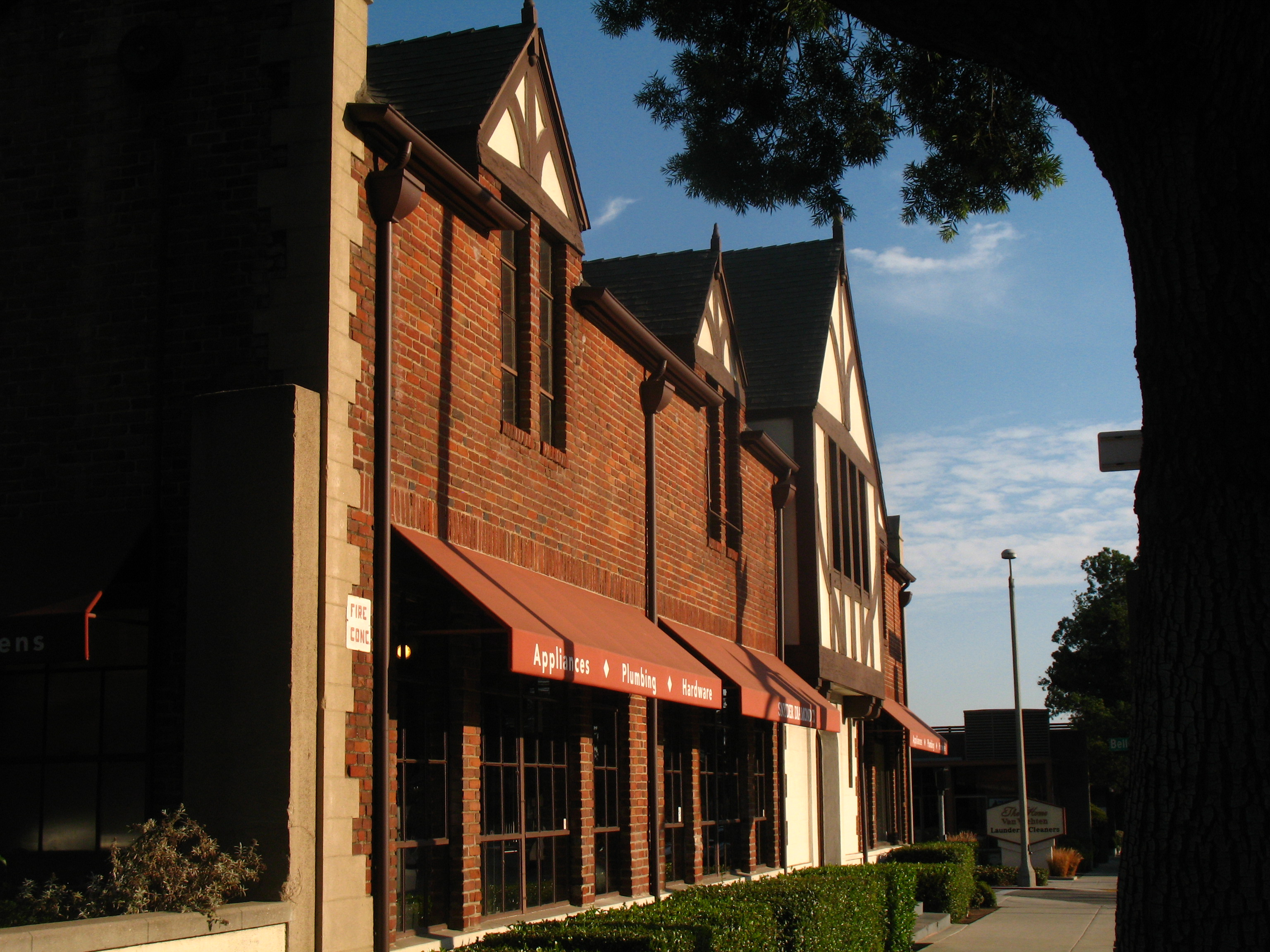

- Location within the Los Angeles metropolitan area Location within California Location within the United States
- Location: 432 S. Arroyo Pkwy., Pasadena, California
- Coordinates: 34°8′18″N 118°8′49″W
- Area: 0.6 acres (0.24 ha)
- Built: 1922
- Built by: Simpson, John A.
- Architect: Marston, Van Pelt & Maybury
- Architectural style: Tudor Revival
- NRHP reference No.: 87000980
- Added to NRHP: June 18, 1987

The Home Laundry is a historic building at 432 S. Arroyo Parkway in Pasadena, California. The building was constructed in 1922 for the Home Laundry Company, a laundry service founded by Pasadena businessmen Daniel M. Linnard, Arnold J. Bertonneau, and Edward K. Hoak. All three were well known in Pasadena, and Linnard had a national reputation for his work in the hotel industry. The company's building represented a new type of building design in Pasadena, as the company's office space and industrial space were both visually separated and structurally integrated. In addition, the building has an uncommon Tudor Revival design created by the local architecture firm Marston, Van Pelt & Maybury. The building's design features ornamental half-timbering on the front façade, coursed brickwork, gabled dormers above the second-story windows, and stone quoins at the corners. The building is the only Tudor Revival commercial or industrial building in Pasadena.

The building was added to the National Register of Historic Places on June 18, 1987.

== See also ==
- Royal Laundry Complex, another laundry in Pasadena
