= Wilmington Branch =

- U.S. National Register of Historic Places
- Los Angeles Historic-Cultural Monument
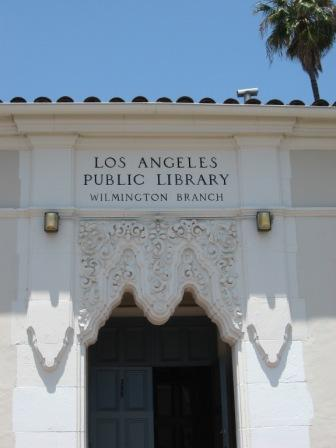

- Location within the Los Angeles metropolitan area Location within California Location within the United States
- Location: 309 W. Opp St., Wilmington, Los Angeles, California
- Coordinates: 34°3′13″N 118°16′6″W
- Built: 1927
- Architect: Marston, Van Pelt & Maybury; McAllister, W.E.
- Architectural style: Mission-Spanish Colonial Revival
- MPS: Los Angeles Branch Library System
- NRHP reference No.: 87001023
- LAHCM No.: 308

Significant dates
- Added to NRHP: May 19, 1987
- Designated LAHCM: June 27, 1986

Wilmington Branch is a branch library of the Los Angeles Public Library located in the Wilmington section of Los Angeles, California. It was built in 1927 based on a Spanish Colonial Revival design by architect W.E. McAllister.

In 1987, the Wilmington Branch and several other branch libraries in Los Angeles were added to the National Register of Historic Places as part of a thematic group submission.

A new building, on Avalon Boulevard and M Street, was constructed in 1988 and is the current home of the Wilmington Branch Library.

== See also ==
- List of Registered Historic Places in Los Angeles
- List of Los Angeles Historic-Cultural Monuments in the Harbor area
- Los Angeles Public Library
