= Shakespeare Club of Pasadena =

Historic social and philanthropic club located in Pasadena, California

Coordinates: 34°08′34″N 118°09′45″W

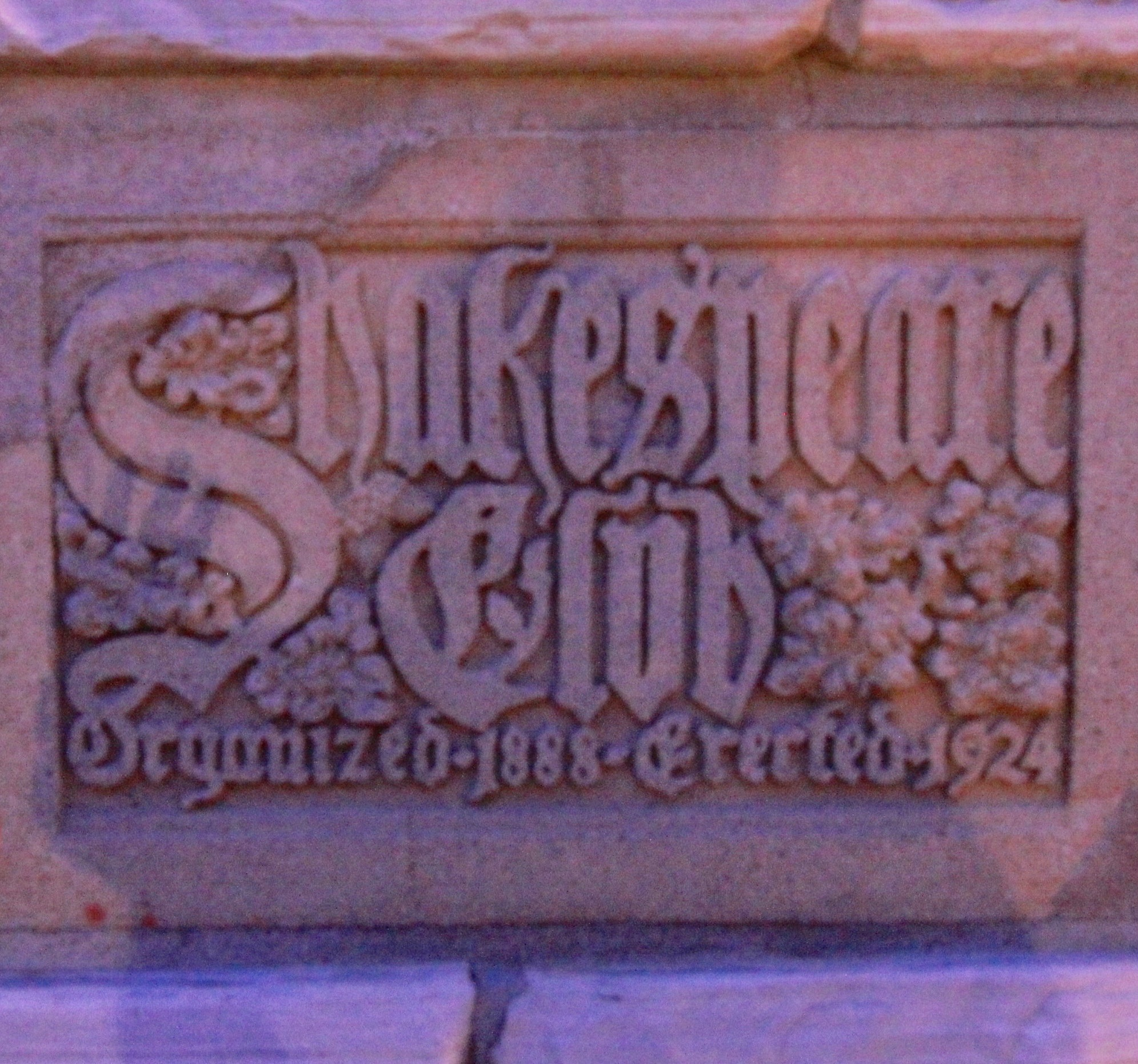
- Concrete marker at the organization's home
- Named after: William Shakespeare
- Formation: 1888
- Founder: Claribel Thompson and Lydia Nash
- Legal status: Social and philanthropic club
- Headquarters: Pasadena, California

The Shakespeare Club of Pasadena is an historic social and philanthropic club located at 171 S. Grand Ave. in Pasadena, California. It was founded in 1888.

== History ==
The club was established in June 1888 by Claribel Thompson and Lydia Nash as a literary study group called the Women's Reading Club. It was initially an offshoot of the Ladies Aid Society of the First Congregational Church. It was one of the west's first women's clubs. The women first met in one another's homes, and then in civic forums such as the Grand Army of the Republic Memorial Hall. It moved into its current location, the 8,580 sq. ft. Villa, in 1972. The building was completed in 1928 as a winter home for arts patron Josephine P. Everett by Sylvanus Marston and Edgar Maybury. Everett occupied the home from 1928 until her death in 1937. During the Cold War, it was used as a listening post and laboratory. In 1966, Lily Crain, widow of musician Hal D. Crain--the former director of the Hollywood Boys Choir--purchased the Villa to use as a home and music conservatory but nothing materialized from the sale. The building itself was granted an Architectural Landmark Designation by the City of Pasadena in 2018.

The club helped in the development of Pasadena, as it sponsored lectures by city planning experts to promote major construction and city works projects. In the modern era, the club hosts lectures, boosts philanthropic and educational projects, and hosts socials.

== Gallery ==
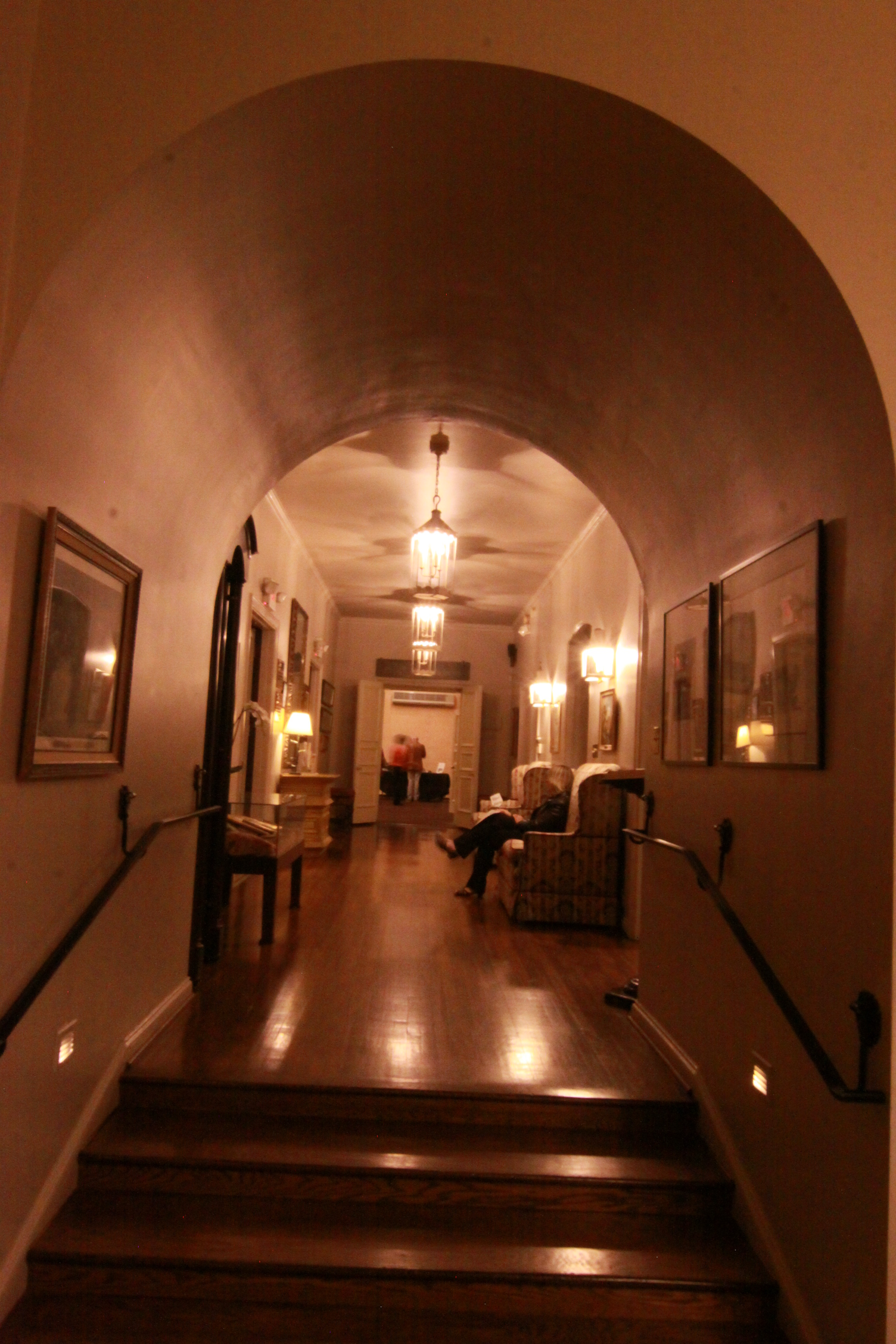
Main hallway

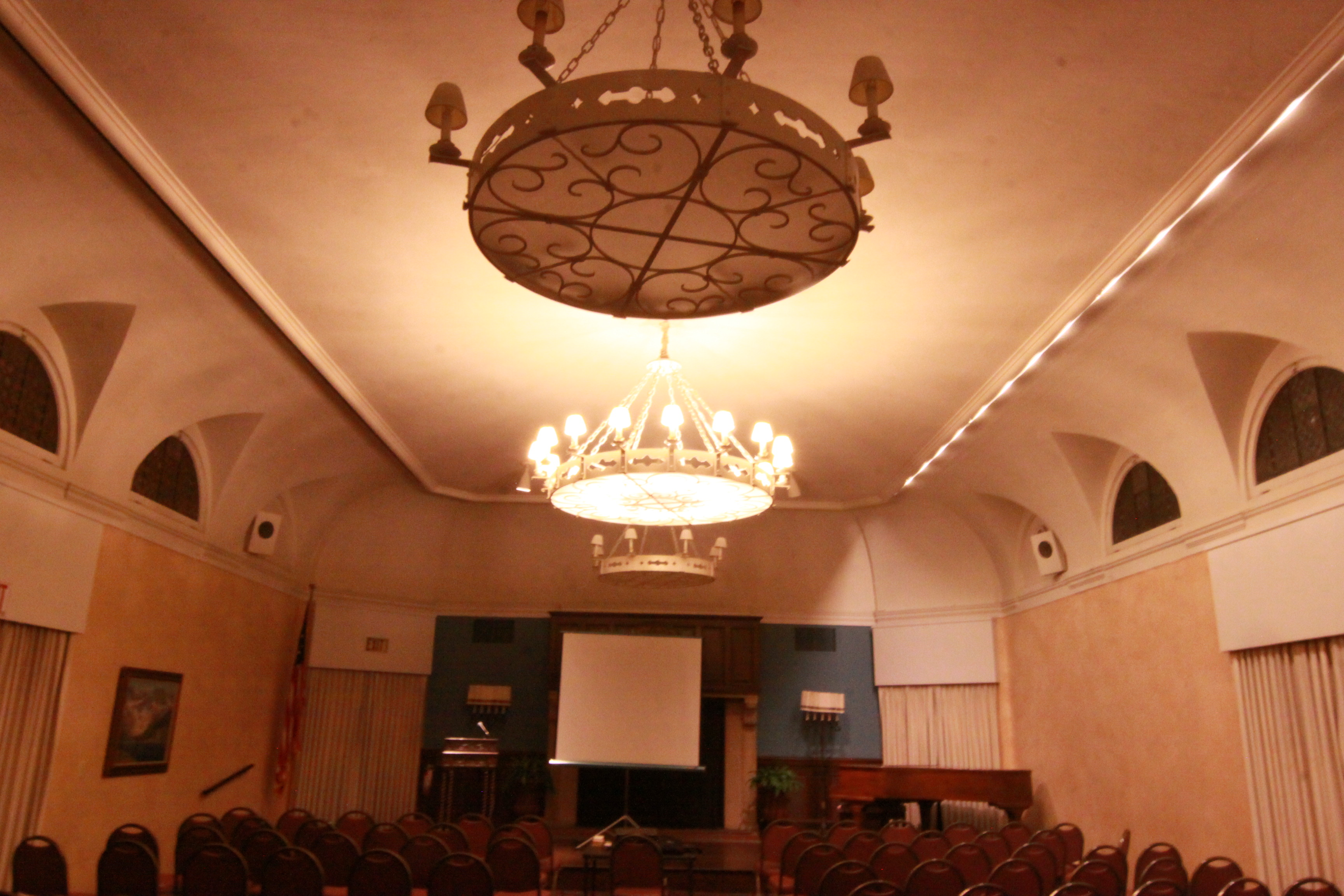
Auditorium

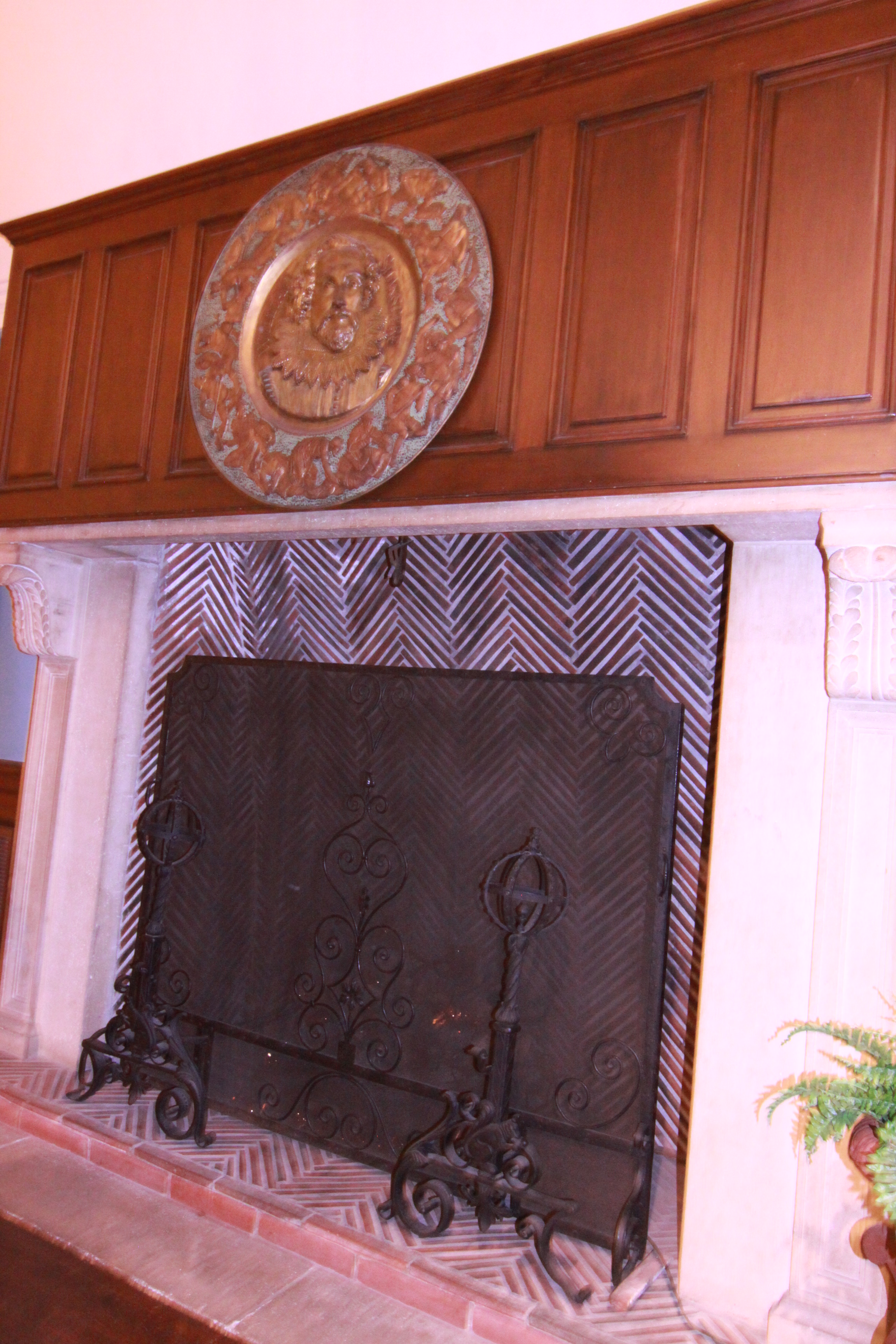
Shakespeare in relief above the auditorium fireplace

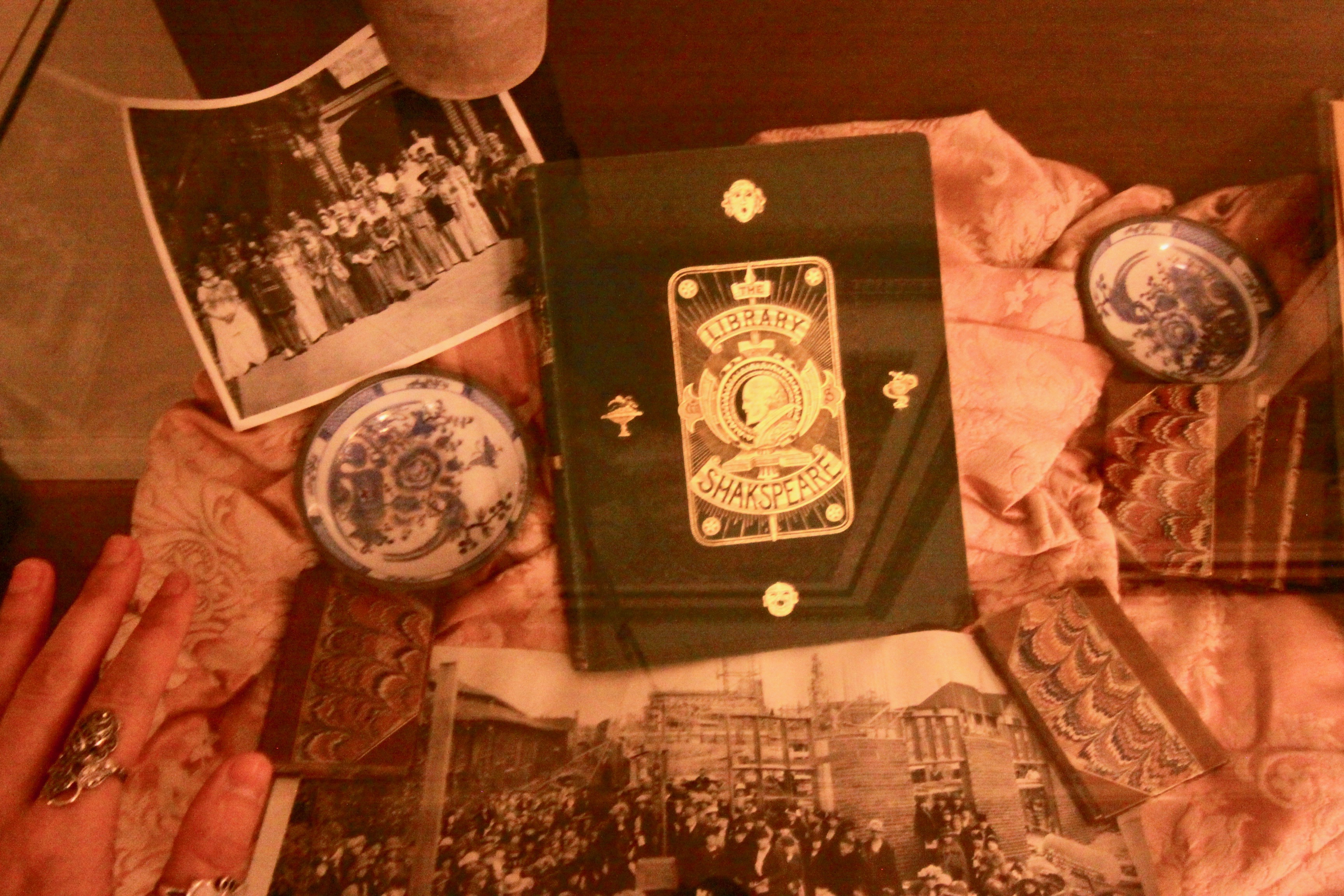
Club mementos
