= The Beatles at the Hollywood Bowl =

Live album by the Beatles
- Released: 4 May 1977
- Recorded: 23 August 1964; 29–30 August 1965
- Venue: Hollywood Bowl, Los Angeles
- Genre: Rock and roll
- Length: 33:15; 43:27 (2016 re-issue)
- Label: Capitol
- Producer: Voyle Gilmore (original recordings); George Martin (mixing and sequencing)

The Beatles chronology
Rock 'n' Roll Music (1976)	The Beatles at the Hollywood Bowl (1977)	Live! at the Star-Club in Hamburg, Germany; 1962 (1977)

The Beatles chronology
1+ (2015)	Live at the Hollywood Bowl (2016)	Sgt. Pepper's Lonely Hearts Club Band: 50th Anniversary Edition (2017)

Live at the Hollywood Bowl
- 2016 release by Universal and Apple

The Beatles at the Hollywood Bowl is a live album by the Beatles, released in May 1977, featuring songs compiled from three performances recorded at the Hollywood Bowl in August 1964 and August 1965. The album was released by Capitol Records in the United States and Canada and on the Parlophone label in the United Kingdom. It was the band's first official live recording. A remixed, remastered, and expanded version of the album, retitled Live at the Hollywood Bowl, was released on 9 September 2016, on CD for the first time, to coincide with the release of the documentary film The Beatles: Eight Days a Week, directed by Ron Howard.

== Background ==
Capitol Records considered recording the Beatles' February 1964 concert at Carnegie Hall in New York, but it could not get the necessary approval from the American Federation of Musicians. Six months later, KRLA DJ Bob Eubanks booked the band's performance of 23 August at the Hollywood Bowl, in Los Angeles, where Capitol recorded their performance with the aim of releasing a live album in America. The sound quality of the tapes proved to be inadequate for commercial release, however, although Capitol used a 48-second excerpt of "Twist and Shout" from the concert on the 1964 documentary album The Beatles' Story.

High-quality black-and-white film of the 1964 show was also made and preserved. Excerpts of "All My Loving" and "She Loves You" from the 23 August 1964 performance appeared in The Beatles Anthology documentary series (1995).

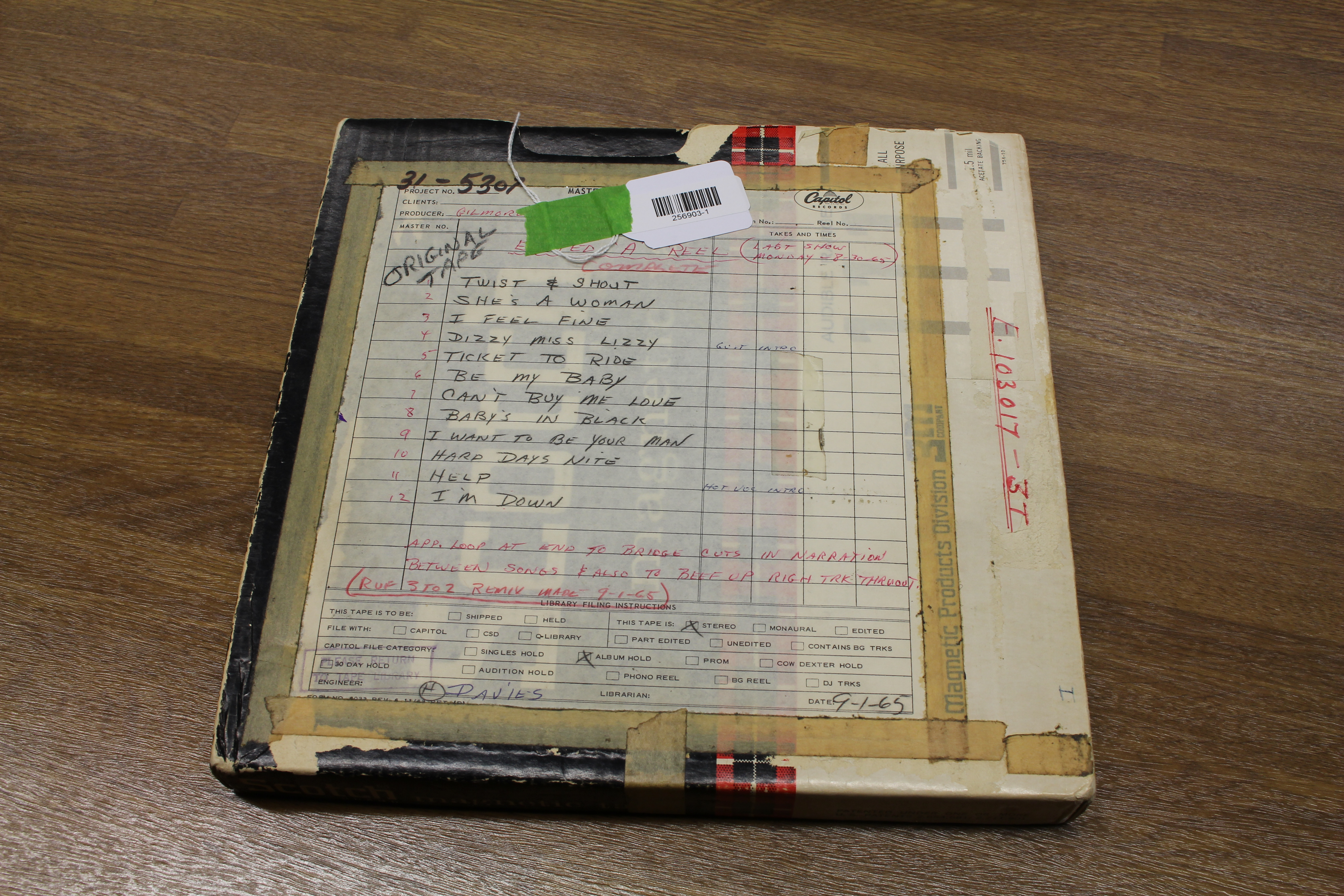
Original tape of the 1965 recording

When the Beatles returned to the Hollywood Bowl a year later, during their 1965 American tour, Capitol recorded two performances by the group at the same venue. The sound quality of the 1965 recordings was equally disappointing.

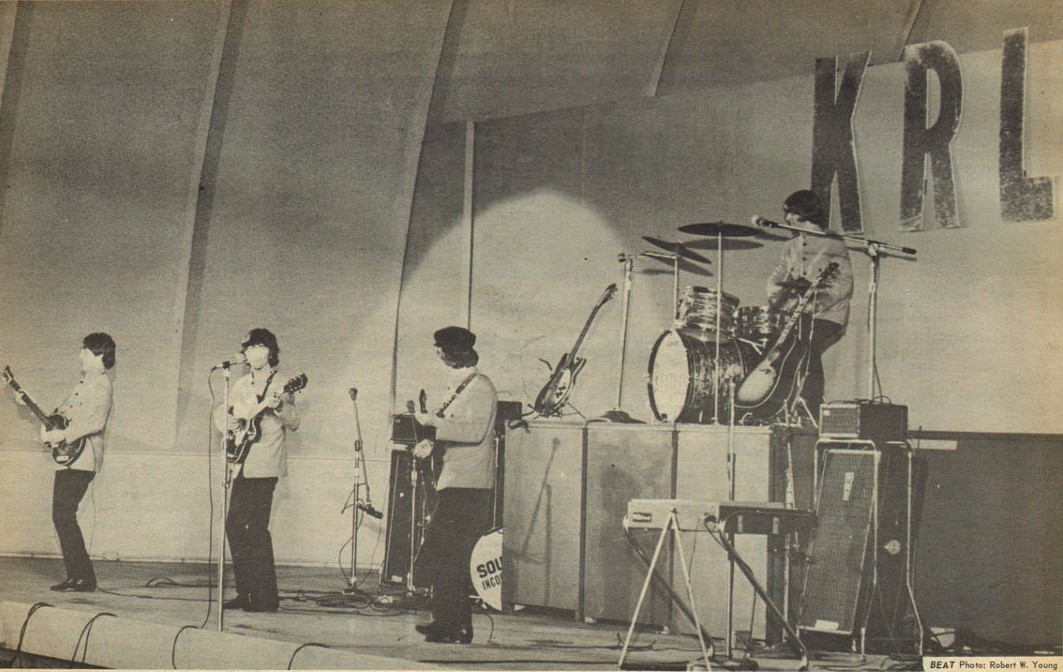
The Beatles performing at the Hollywood Bowl, August 1965.

The Beatles were among the few major recording artists of the 1960s not to have issued a live album. Consequently, among Beatles fans, pent-up demand for a concert album continued to build. John Lennon set off a minor frenzy when, in a 1971 Rolling Stone interview, he incorrectly identified an obscure Italian compilation album, The Beatles in Italy, as a live recording ("There's one in Italy apparently, that somebody recorded there"). Despite the obvious demand for a live album, the tapes from the three Hollywood Bowl performances lay untouched in a Capitol vault. In 1971, after American record producer Phil Spector's salvaging of the Get Back tapes, which was released as the group's Let It Be album, the Hollywood Bowl tapes were given to him to see whether he could fashion an album from the material. Either Spector did not complete the job or his production was unsatisfactory, and the tapes sat unreleased for another six years.

A complete tape of the August 1964 performance found its way out of the Capitol vault in the early 1970s and was the basis of a popular bootleg LP, Back in 64 at the Hollywood Bowl. The audio, while below professional release standards, was more than adequate for desperate hardcore fans and served for years as the standard recording of the summer 1964 tour.

Finally, with a rival record label's impending release of the Live! at the Star-Club in Hamburg, Germany; 1962 album, consisting of a 15-year-old, poor-quality mono concert recording of the group performing in the Star-Club in Hamburg, Capitol Records' president, Bhaskar Menon, decided to revisit the Hollywood Bowl recordings. Beatles producer George Martin was handed the tapes and asked to compile a listenable "official" live album.

When Martin heard the tapes, he was impressed by the performances but disappointed by the sound quality. In working on the 3-track Hollywood Bowl concert tapes, Martin discovered quite a challenge. The first difficulty was finding a working three-track machine with which to play them. Once he found one, he discovered that the machine overheated when it was running, melting the magnetic tape. Martin and recording engineer Geoff Emerick came up with the solution of blowing air from a vacuum cleaner to keep the tape deck cool whilst the recordings were transferred to 16-track tape for filtering, equalization, editing, and mixing.

Although the original album sleeve says that the recordings were all made on 23 August 1964 and 30 August 1965, "Ticket to Ride" and "Help!" were recorded on 29 August 1965, and "Dizzy Miss Lizzy" is a composite using parts from both nights in 1965.

A number of songs performed at the 23 August 1964 and 30 August 1965 concerts were not included on the album. Songs from the 23 August 1964 show that were not on the album are "Twist and Shout", "You Can't Do That", "Can't Buy Me Love", "If I Fell", "I Want to Hold Your Hand", and "A Hard Day's Night". Songs from the 30 August 1965 show that were not on the album are "I Feel Fine", "Everybody's Trying to Be My Baby", "Baby's in Black", "I Wanna Be Your Man", and "I'm Down". "Baby's in Black" from the 30 August 1965 concert was issued as the B-side of the "Real Love" single (1996), and "I Want to Hold Your Hand" from the 1964 concert was mixed into the studio version of the song for the Love album (2006). Those two performances, along with the 1964 performance of "You Can't Do That" and the 30 August 1965 "Everybody's Trying to Be My Baby", were included on Live at the Hollywood Bowl, in 2016.

== Release ==
The album was originally released as a vinyl LP on 4 May 1977. Though the recordings were 12 and 13 years old, the album reached number one on the New Musical Express chart in the UK and number two on the Billboard chart in the US. In France, a single was released featuring two songs from the LP: "Ticket to Ride" with "Dizzy Miss Lizzy" on the B-side.

As of 12 June 1977, it was one of three live albums in the Top Ten of the Billboard chart, alongside Barry Manilow Live (at number seven) and Marvin Gaye's Live at the London Palladium (at number nine), with the Beatles at number two.

The original 1977 album was also officially released simultaneously on 8-track tape and cassette but was not officially released on compact disc until 9 September 2016, when it was re-released worldwide as Live at the Hollywood Bowl. Shortly before the re-release date, a number of tracks were available for purchase and streaming early, and the album was available for pre-order on the iTunes Store. The re-released album was simultaneously released as a digital download and made available on streaming services. It was also released on vinyl on 18 November 2016.

A music video of the performance of "Boys" was released to promote the remixed album.

Before the official digital release of the album, bootleggers circulated transfers of the LP, and complete recordings of the three concerts, on CD and the Internet.

=== Live at the Hollywood Bowl ===
Live at the Hollywood Bowl is a remixed and remastered version of the album, released on 9 September 2016 to coincide with the release of The Beatles: Eight Days a Week. It includes four additional songs not found on the original release. According to the producer, Giles Martin, son of the Beatles' original producer, George Martin, "Capitol Studios called saying they'd discovered some Hollywood Bowl three track tapes in their archive. We transferred them and noticed an improvement over the tapes we've kept in the London archive. Alongside this I'd been working for some time with a team headed by technical engineer James Clarke on demix technology, the ability to remove and separate sounds from a single track." It was released on 9 September 2016, seven years to the day after the release of the band's remastered core catalogue and The Beatles: Rock Band.

One of the bonus tracks on the album is "Baby's in Black" from the "Real Love" single CD, which was previously unavailable on an album or as a digital download.

== Critical reception ==
Professional ratings
Aggregate scores
Source	Rating
Metacritic	87/100
Review scores
Source	Rating
AllMusic	4/5 stars
Encyclopedia of Popular Music	2/5 stars
Rolling Stone	favourable
The Rolling Stone Album Guide	4/5 stars
The Village Voice	A

Reviewing The Beatles at the Hollywood Bowl for The Miami Herald, Al Rudis opined that while all of the songs are on other Beatles albums in better quality, Beatles fans would still want the live album to complete their collections or for reminiscing, and are "bound to pull it out again" in later years to show their grandchildren. Rudis says that while the "sloppiness" of the album may stem from the Beatles being unable to decipher their performance properly over the primitive amplification and monitoring systems, the atmosphere of the concert – such as the excited fans and "bemused wonderment of the boys" – comes through. Cliff Radel of The Cincinnati Enquirer comments that the "harpyesque screaming" lasts throughout the album, but as it progresses, the screams "fade from the listener's consciousness [and] become white noise. But their presence never completely departs." Radel praised George Martin's "fine job" in "remixing, filtering, equalizing and transferring the three-track tapes to the multi-track techniques of 1977."

The Beatles at the Hollywood Bowl was voted the 26th best record of 1977 in the Pazz & Jop, an annual poll of American critics published by The Village Voice. Robert Christgau, the poll's supervisor, ranked it 12th on his own year-end list, and in a review for the newspaper, he wrote:

A tribute not only to the Beatles (which figured) but to George Martin and Capitol (which didn't necessarily figure at all). The sound rings clearly and powerfully through the shrieking: the segues are brisk and the punch-ins imperceptible; and the songs capture our heroes at their highest. Furthermore, though the musicianship is raw, the arrangements are tighter (faster, actually) than on record.

In The Rolling Stone Album Guide (2004), Rob Sheffield called the record "a loving tribute to the screaming girl fans who drown out the band in these 1964–65 shows; those girls were heroes on the rock & roll frontier, and they deserve to be the lead instrument on a Beatles album of their own." AllMusic critic Richard S. Ginell was impressed by the Beatles' performances under the chaotic circumstances, although he lamented the sound quality and separation from the crowd noise, citing it as a possible reason for the record remaining out of print. In their 2015 list of the "greatest lost albums", Uncut write that while the album is "scarcely a hi-fi listening experience", it is a revelatory listen because it showcases thirteen "raw, R'n'B-weighted tracks" that are clearly audible and prove "what a spookily tight, breathlessly exciting live act they could be. Great between-song patter, as well." The Guardian's Gwilym Mumford writes that while the original 1977 is regarded as one of the weaker Beatles albums, the 2016 remix emboldens both the melodic and muscular, proto-punk qualities of the band's live sound.

== Legacy ==
Commenting on the "nonstop screaming of fans" through the album, Rolling Stone write that "aside from its value as a document of what a Beatles show actually sounded like, the album anticipated a whole generation of music by British shoegazer bands like My Bloody Valentine and the Jesus and Mary Chain, with catchy songs almost completely drowned out by white noise." Michael Hann of The Guardian also compared the album to the Jesus and Mary Chain, due to "the screams of thousands and thousands of teenagers, screams that blanket the music in sheets of white noise, for all the world like William Reid's feedback on Psychocandy." My Bloody Valentine guitarist Kevin Shields was inspired by The Beatles at the Hollywood Bowl after hearing the album as a child and being fascinated by the band's music being largely concealed beneath the noise of screaming fans, and that this was one influence on his intention to create "the most beautiful songs with the most extremeness of physicality and sound", leading to the fuzz-drenched sound of albums like Loveless (1991). Shields also sampled the audience screams from the Beatles album on My Bloody Valentine's "Clair" (1987), burying the song beneath them.

== Track listing ==
All tracks are written by Lennon–McCartney, except where noted.

Side one
No.	Title	Writer(s)	Recording date	Length
1.	"Twist and Shout"	Phil Medley, Bert Russell	30 August 1965	1:33
2.	"She's a Woman"		30 August 1965	2:53
3.	"Dizzy Miss Lizzy"	Larry Williams	29/30 August 1965	3:39
4.	"Ticket to Ride"		29 August 1965	2:51
5.	"Can't Buy Me Love"		30 August 1965	2:14
6.	"Things We Said Today"		23 August 1964	2:18
7.	"Roll Over Beethoven"	Chuck Berry	23 August 1964	2:28

Side two
No.	Title	Writer(s)	Recording date	Length
1.	"Boys"	Luther Dixon, Wes Farrell	23 August 1964	2:08
2.	"A Hard Day's Night"		30 August 1965	3:13
3.	"Help!"		29 August 1965	2:46
4.	"All My Loving"		23 August 1964	2:15
5.	"She Loves You"		23 August 1964	2:31
6.	"Long Tall Sally"	Enotris Johnson, Richard Penniman, Robert Blackwell	23 August 1964	2:53
Total length:				33:15

2016 reissue bonus tracks
No.	Title	Writer(s)	Recording date	Length
14.	"You Can't Do That"		23 August 1964	2:34
15.	"I Want to Hold Your Hand"		23 August 1964	2:29
16.	"Everybody's Trying to Be My Baby"	Carl Perkins	30 August 1965	2:21
17.	"Baby's in Black"		30 August 1965	2:44
Total length:				43:27

2016 vinyl editions shift tracks 1 to 9 on side one, while tracks 10 to 17 (Including all 4 bonus tracks) were shifted to side two.

== Personnel ==
- John Lennon – lead and backing vocals, rhythm guitar
- Paul McCartney – lead and backing vocals, bass guitar
- George Harrison – lead guitar, backing vocals, lead vocals on "Roll Over Beethoven" and "Everybody's Trying to Be My Baby"
- Ringo Starr – drums, lead vocals on "Boys"

== Charts ==
=== Weekly charts ===
Chart (1977)	Position
Australian Kent Music Report	12
Austrian Albums Chart	3
Canadian RPM Albums Chart	8
Finland (Suomen virallinen lista)	18
Italian M&D Albums Chart	24
Japanese Oricon LP Chart	1
New Zealand Albums Chart	18
Norwegian VG-lista Albums Chart	4
Swedish Albums Chart	17
UK Albums Chart	1
US Billboard 200	2
West German Media Control Albums Chart	10

Chart (2016)	Position
Italian M&D Albums Chart	13
UK Albums Chart	3
US Billboard 200	7

=== Year-end charts ===
Chart (1977)	Position
Australian Albums Chart	86
Japanese Albums Chart	15
Canadian Albums Chart	54

=== Certifications ===
Region	Certification	Certified units/sales
Canada (Music Canada)	Platinum	100,000^{^}
France (SNEP)	Gold	100,000^{*}
Japan (Oricon Charts)	—	186,000
United Kingdom (BPI)	Gold	100,000^{^}
United States (RIAA)	Platinum	1,000,000^{^}
^{*} Sales figures based on certification alone.^{^} Shipments figures based on certification alone.

== See also ==
- Live at the Hollywood Bowl (disambiguation), for other artists' performances at the Hollywood Bowl
