= Arden Villa =

- Location within the Los Angeles metropolitan area Arden Villa (California) Arden Villa (the United States)

General information
- Type: House
- Architectural style: Palladian Revival
- Location: 1145 Arden Rd., Pasadena, California
- Coordinates: 34.13297°N 118.12456°W
- Completed: 1913
- Governing body: Private

Technical details
- Grounds: 2.44 acres (0.99 ha)

Arden Villa is a Palladian-style estate located in Pasadena, California, designed by the architectural firm Marston & Van Pelt in 1913 for William Kennon Jewett. Arden Villa has gained fame not only for its architectural splendor but also for its appearances in various movies and TV shows, including the popular 1980s TV drama Dynasty.

Arden Villa was also used in the classic 1980's US TV series Knight Rider, as the base HQ for the fictional non-profit organization known as the Foundation for Law and Government. Knight Rider was an action drama series featuring a lone crime fighter Michael Knight and his artificially intelligent talking car called KITT.

Arden Villa has been a filming location, appearing in various movies, TV shows, and commercials.

== History ==
Built in 1913, on lots 11, 12, 13, 14 of the Arden Road Tract, for William Kennon Jewett, a mining tycoon and railroad heir, Arden Villa was a statement of opulence and luxury during its time. Originally spanning 9 acres (3.6 ha), the estate was gradually subdivided over the years, reducing its size to 2.5 acres (1.0 ha) by the 1950s.

The property has since changed ownership several times, most notably in May 2013 when it was sold for an unprecedented $28 million, setting a new benchmark for home prices in the San Gabriel and San Fernando valleys.

The home, with 2.44 acres (0.99 ha), is listed for sale in 2023.

== In popular culture ==
The south gated entrance was a filming location, for Cops (1922).

The lily pond was a filming location, for Duck Soup (1933), and Brain Donors (1992), a loose remake of the former.

Arden Villa was used as the setting for the memorable 1983 lily pond catfight scene between the characters Krystle Carrington and Alexis Colby in the 1980s prime time soap opera Dynasty.

It was the primary location for the video of Oasis's "Don't Look Back in Anger", filmed in December, 1995.

Other films made on the property, of at least 21, include: Get Your Man (1927), Death Wish (1974), True Confessions (1981), and Gods and Monsters (1998).

Other Television series made on the property include: CSI: Miami, The Love Boat, CHiPs, The Incredible Hulk (1977), The A-Team (1983), Knight Rider (1982), The Twilight Zone (1959).
