= Mario Lanza Live at Hollywood Bowl: Historical Recordings (1947 & 1951) =

Mario Lanza Live at the Hollywood Bowl: Historical Recordings (1947 & 1951)

Live album by Mario Lanza
- Released: 2000
- Recorded: 1947, 1951
- Genre: Opera, Neapolitan and Italian songs, traditional pop
- Length: 76:54
- Label: Gala

Mario Lanza Live at the Hollywood Bowl: Historical Recordings (1947 & 1951) is a 2000 CD, released by the Gala label (GL 311), includes the six selections that tenor Mario Lanza sang at his first Hollywood Bowl concert on August 27, 1947. This is the performance that first brought Lanza to the attention of Hollywood, and shortly afterwards he was signed to a seven-year film contract with MGM. Included from the performance at the Bowl are six arias, three of them in duet with soprano Frances Yeend. Eugene Ormandy conducts the Hollywood Bowl Orchestra for these performances.

Reviewing the concert in the Los Angeles Examiner, Ernest Lonsdale wrote that, "Mario Lanza could have taken the Bowl with him. [His] voice is rich, full, warm and ringing. He has expression, emotion and good pronunciation. His operatic potentialities, if he works hard for a few more years, are unmistakably great."

In addition to the six classical selections from the Bowl, this album included fourteen recordings from The Mario Lanza Show radio broadcasts. These songs were introduced by Mario Lanza and his regular announcer, Bill Baldwin. They include three Neapolitan songs, his million-selling hits, several of his evergreen popular songs, and the aria "O paradiso". Ray Sinatra served as conductor on these radio broadcasts taped between June and September 1951.

== Track listing ==
1. "Una furtiva lagrima" – (Gaetano Donizetti: L'elisir d'amore) – 4:57 (Bowl)
2. "Un dì all'azzurro spazio" – (Umberto Giordano: Andrea Chénier) – 4:45 (Bowl)
3. "E lucevan le stelle" – (Giacomo Puccini: Tosca) – 3:17 (Bowl)
4. "Parigi, o cara" (duet with Frances Yeend) – (Giuseppe Verdi: La traviata) – 5:25 (Bowl)
5. "Vogliatemi bene, un bene piccolino" (duet with Frances Yeend) – (Giacomo Puccini: Madama Butterfly) – 6:56 (Bowl)
6. "O soave fanciulla" (duet with Frances Yeend) – (Giacomo Puccini: La bohème) – 4:04 (Bowl)
7. "Funiculì, Funiculà" – (Luigi Denza, Giuseppe Turco) – 2:30 (Radio)
8. "My Song, My Love" – (Gerda Beilson, Beelby) – 3:45 (Radio)
9. "Diane" – (Ernö Rapée, Lew Pollack) – 3:33 (Radio)
10. "Thine Alone" – (Victor Herbert, Henry Blossom) – 3:06 (Radio)
11. "'A vucchella" – (Paolo Tosti, Gabriele D'Annunzio) – 2:59 (Radio)
12. "Toselli's Serenade" (Serenata 'Rimpianto' Op. 6, No. 1) – (Enrico Toselli, Alfredo Silvestri) – 3:59 (Radio)
13. "Because You're Mine" – (Nicholas Brodszky, Sammy Cahn) – 2:31 (Radio)
14. "The Loveliest Night of the Year" – (Juventino P. Rosas, Irving Aaronson, Paul Francis Webster) – 3:25 (Radio)
15. "O Paradiso" – (Giacomo Meyerbeer: L'Africaine) – 3:36 (Radio)
16. "The Rosary" – (Ethelbert Nevin) – 2:53 (Radio)
17. "If (They Made Me a King)" – (Tolchard Evans, Robert Hargreaves, Stanley Damerell) – 3:28 (Radio)
18. "They Didn't Believe Me" – (Jerome Kern, Herbert Reynolds) – 4:57 (Radio)
19. "The Lord's Prayer" – (Albert Hay Malotte) – 3:35 (Radio)
20. "Be My Love" – (Nicholas Brodszky, Sammy Cahn) – 3:05 (Radio)
