= Josephine P. Everett =

Josephine Pettingill Everett
- Born: May 12, 1886; Cleveland, Ohio
- Resting place: Lake View Cemetery, Cleveland, Ohio
- Occupations: Patron of the arts, arts leader, and philanthropist.
- Spouse: Henry A. Everett
- Children: Leolyn Louise Everett Spelman, Dorothy Burnham Everett
- Parent(s): Charles Ballard Pettengill and Abbey Louise Burnham Pettengill

Josephine Pettingill Everett (May 12, 1866 – July 4, 1937) was a patron of the arts, arts leader, and philanthropist. She is credited with being a major supporter of the Hollywood Bowl and the Pasadena Playhouse at their inception. Her home became the headquarters of the Shakespeare Club of Pasadena.

== Early life ==
Everett was a Cleveland, Ohio native. She became a permanent resident of Pasadena after her husband, Henry A. Everett, died in 1917. Her philanthropy likely stemmed from her father, Charles Ballard Pettengill, a founding member of Cleveland's Society for the Prevention of Cruelty to Animals (SPCA) in the 1870s, which evolved to encompass a humane society that served women and children.

== Career ==
Everett was a primary financial supporter of the Hollywood Bowl, which was founded in 1922, and the Pasadena Playhouse, founded 1924. In 1922, in her deceased daughter Dorothy Burnham Everett's name, Everett donated more than 100 notable paintings and sculptures from her collection of over 500 art pieces to the Cleveland Museum of Art, the now-Pasadena Norton Simon Museum of Art, and the San Diego Museum of Fine Arts. She also loaned pieces of art to various museums all over the country. In 1934, she donated her collection of 521 books on women and women's issues to the Huntington Library in San Marino. The donation ended up forming the core of the museum's holdings in women's studies.

Everett also supported musicians at her home, the Villa, in Pasadena. Among the numerous performers she hosted were concert pianist Lillian Steuber, the London String Quartet, and the local Coleman Chamber Music Ensemble. She hosted musicals at the home as well.

Everett sat on various boards of organizations including the Los Angeles Philharmonic Orchestra and Pasadena Civic Orchestra, making significant financial contributions to the latter. She also served as president of the Pasadena Community Playhouse Association and was a supporter of the California Institute of Technology, the Pasadena Public Library, the Neighborhood Church in Pasadena, the Salvation Army, and Scripps College.

== Death ==
After a year of illness, Everett died at her home, the Villa, on July 4, 1937. She bequeathed an estimated endowment of $500,000 to the Cleveland Museum of Art, in addition to her donated art.
