= Hollywood Bowl =

Amphitheater in Los Angeles, California

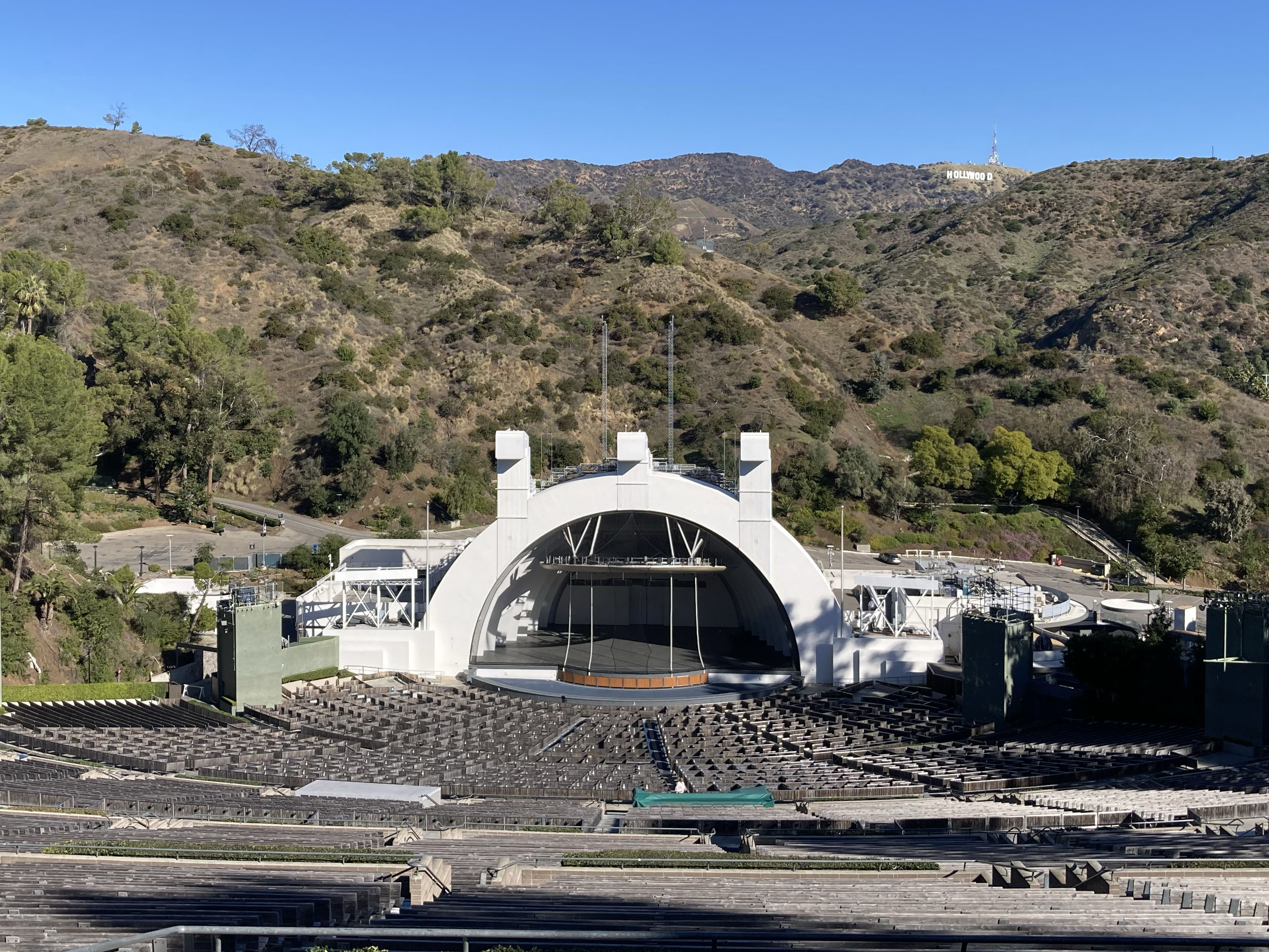
- The Hollywood Bowl in 2024 with the Hollywood Sign in background

- Location within the Los Angeles metropolitan area Location within California Location within the United States
- Location: 2301 North Highland Avenue; Los Angeles, California
- Coordinates: 34°06′46″N 118°20′20″W
- Owner: County of Los Angeles
- Operator: County of Los Angeles; Los Angeles Philharmonic Association
- Seating type: reserved seating
- Capacity: 17,500
- Type: Outdoor Amphitheater
- Public transit: Los Angeles Metro Rail; B Line at Hollywood/Highland; Los Angeles Metro Bus; Line 224 (both directions); Line 222 (southbound only)

Construction
- Opened: July 11, 1922
- Renovated: 2003–2004

Website
- Official website
- Hollywood Bowl
- U.S. National Register of Historic Places
- Area: 70 acres (28 ha)
- NRHP reference No.: 100009637
- Added to NRHP: December 22, 2023

The Hollywood Bowl is an amphitheatre and public park in the Hollywood Hills of Los Angeles, California. It was named one of the ten best live music venues in the United States by Rolling Stone magazine in 2018 and was listed on the National Register of Historic Places in 2023.

The Hollywood Bowl is known for its distinctive bandshell, originally a set of concentric arches that graced the site from 1929 through 2003, before being replaced with a larger one to begin the 2004 season. The shell is set against the backdrop of the Hollywood Hills and the Hollywood Sign to the northeast.

The "bowl" refers to the shape of the concave meadow or dell, originally called Daisy Dell, into which the amphitheatre is carved. The Bowl is owned by the County of Los Angeles and is the home of the Hollywood Bowl Orchestra, the summer home of the Los Angeles Philharmonic, and the host venue for hundreds of musical events each year.

Located on North Highland Avenue, it is north of Hollywood Boulevard and approximately 1 mile (1.6 km) from the Hollywood/Highland Metro Rail station. It is adjacent to U.S. Route 101.

== History ==
=== Siting and opening ===
The site of the Hollywood Bowl was chosen in 1919 by William Reed and his son H. Ellis Reed, who were dispatched to find a suitable location for outdoor performances by the members of the newly formed Theatre Arts Alliance, headed by Christine Wetherill Stevenson. The Reeds selected a natural theater, a shaded canyon and popular picnic spot known as Daisy Dell in Bolton Canyon, which was chosen for its natural acoustics and its proximity to downtown Hollywood. The Community Park and Art Association, then headed by F. W. Blanchard, was the first organization to begin building the Bowl.

One of the earliest performances at the Bowl was Hollywood High School's Performance of Shakespeare's Twelfth Night. The Women's World Peace Concert was held on November 11, 1921. On November 11, 1921, the first Sunrise Service took place at the bowl, in one of its first major events. With the building of the first actual stage, consisting of little more than wooden platforms and canvas, The Bowl officially opened on July 11, 1922.

=== Community function ===
The Bowl began as a community space rather than a privately owned establishment. Proceeds from the early events at the Bowl went to financing the construction of new elements of the bowl such as a stage and seating in 1922 and 1923 respectively. In 1924, a backdrop to the stage was added.

During the early years of the Bowl's existence, concert tickets were kept at the lowest available price of 25 cents using the slogan popular prices will prevail, coined by F.W. Blanchard. While serving as the venue for concerts by the Los Angeles Philharmonic, the Bowl also served as a community space, used for Easter services, the Hollywood Community Chorus, as well as Young Artists Nights where younger musicians could perform well-known classical music. Children were also invited to perform at community events with the Los Angeles Philharmonic and the Hollywood Community Chorus, beginning with Sibelius' Finlandia in 1921.

The Bowl hosted a variety of Native American tribal events, as well as international music ensembles.

In 1924, the land was deeded to the County of Los Angeles.

=== Women in the Bowl ===
Many of the key influential figures in the founding of the Hollywood Bowl were women, most notably the pianist Artie Mason Carter, whose connections with the Los Angeles arts patrons were vital in the early days of the Bowl's existence. Christine Wetherill Stevenson and Marie Rankin Clarke both donated $21,000 to purchase the land on which the bowl was built. E.J. Wakeman, Leiland Atherton Irish, Harriet Clay Penman, and composers Gertrude Ross and Carrie Jacobs Bond all contributed to the Bowl through fundraising drives. Josephine P. Everett was a financial contributor as well.

=== Band shells ===
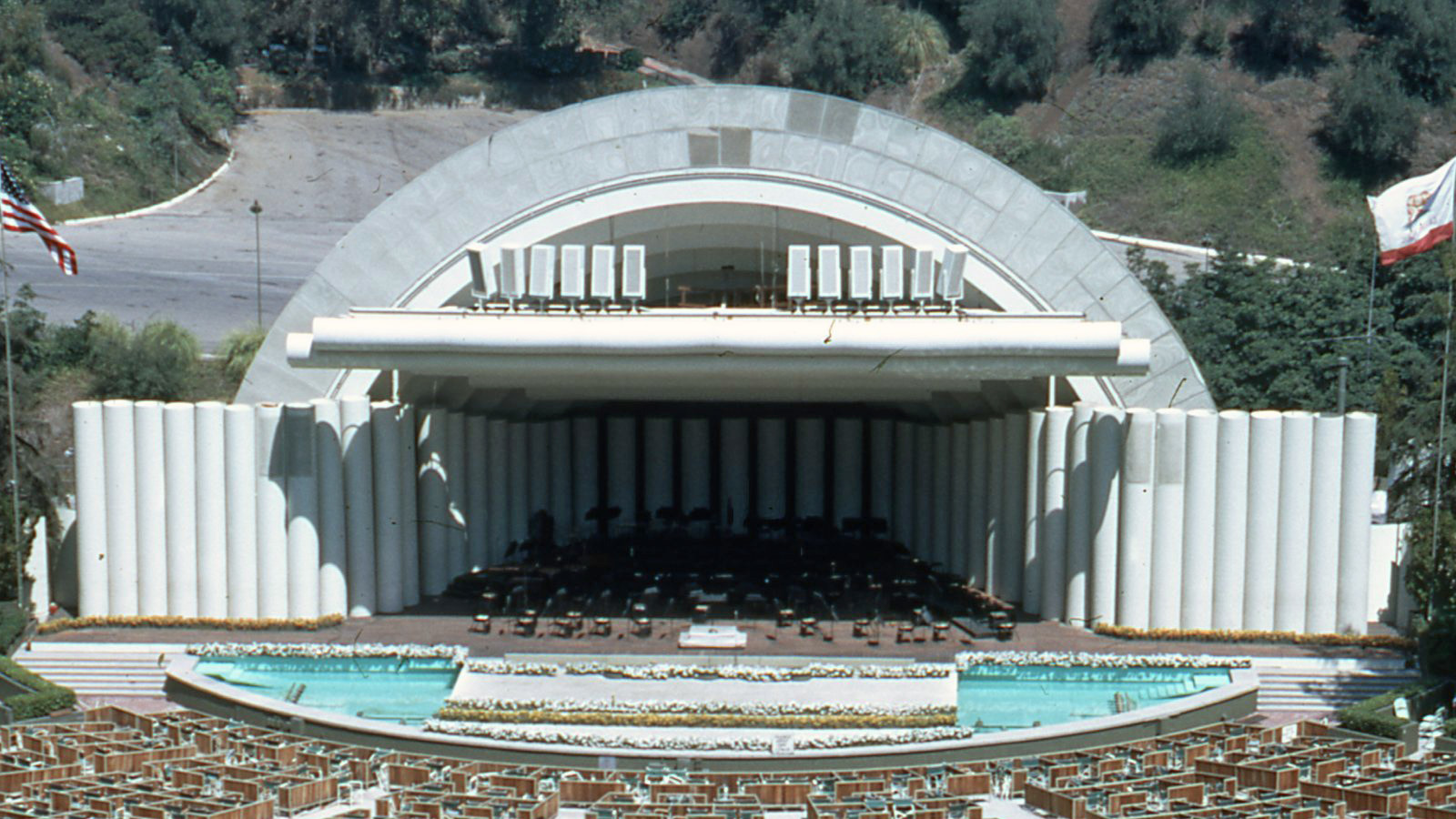
The Hollywood Bowl's 1970s appearance, with the large cardboard tubes

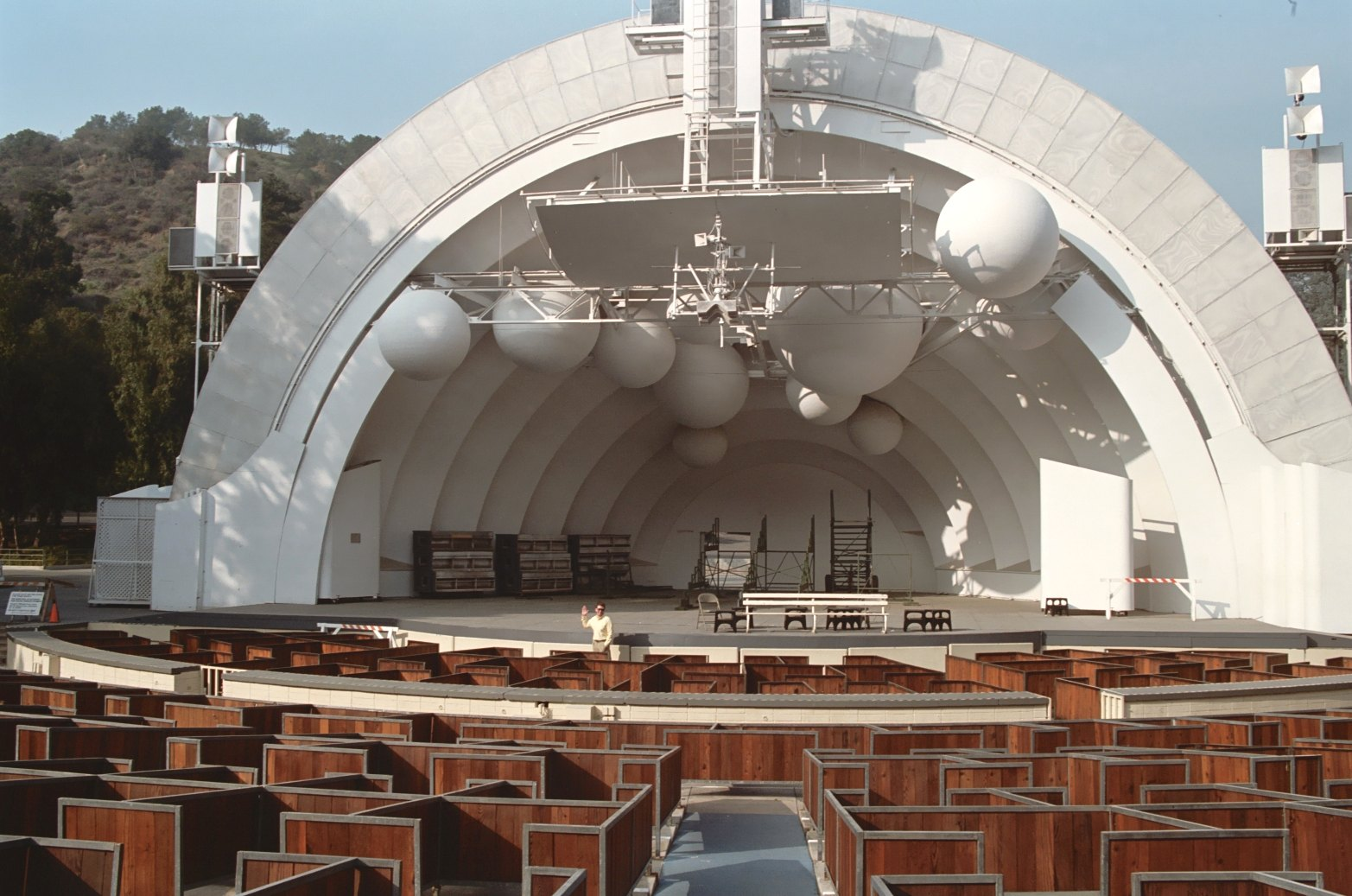
The Hollywood Bowl's 1980s–2003 appearance, with the acoustic fiberglass spheres

Frank Lloyd Wright, Jr. (commonly known as Lloyd Wright) designed the second and third band shells. The original 1926 shell, designed by the Allied Architects Association, was considered unacceptable both visually and acoustically. Wright's 1927 shell had a pyramidal shape and a design reminiscent of southwest Indigenous architecture. Its acoustics generally were regarded as the best of any shell in Bowl history. But its appearance was considered too avant-garde, or even ugly, and it was demolished at the end of the season. His 1928 wooden shell had the now-familiar concentric ring motif, covered a 120-degree arc, and was designed to be easily dismantled. Unfortunately it was neglected and ruined by water damage.

For the 1929 season, the Allied Architects built the shell that stood until 2003, using a transite skin over a metal frame. Its acoustics, though not nearly as good as those of the Lloyd Wright shells, were deemed satisfactory at first, and its clean lines and white, semicircular arches were copied for music shells elsewhere. As the acoustics deteriorated, various measures were used to mitigate the problems, starting in the 1970s with an inner shell made from large cardboard tubes, which were replaced in the early 1980s by large fiberglass spheres (both designed by Frank Gehry) that remained until 2003.

These dampened the unfavorable acoustics, but required massive use of electronic amplification to reach the full audience, particularly since the background noise level had risen sharply since the 1920s. The appearance underwent other visual changes as well, including the addition of a broad outer arch (forming a proscenium) where it had once had only a narrow rim, and a reflecting pool in front of the stage that lasted from 1953 till 1972. Sculptor George Stanley, designer of the Oscar statuette, designed the Muse Fountain which has stood outside the Hollywood Bowl's main entrance since 1940.

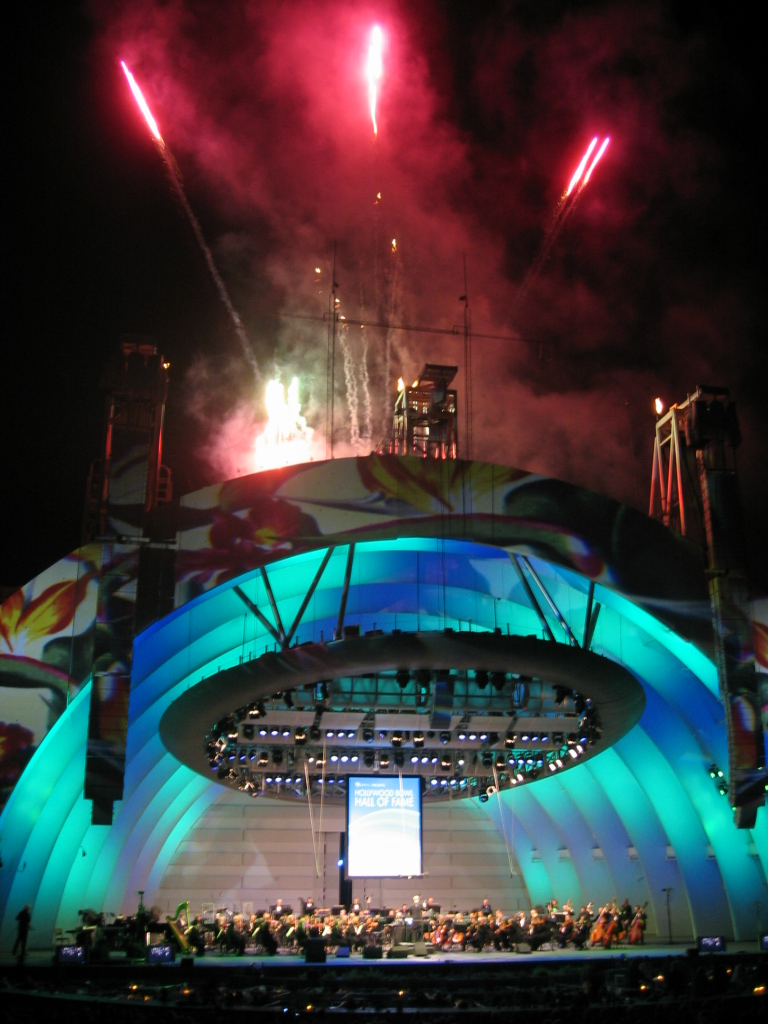
The Hollywood Bowl re-opening night, 2005

Shortly after the end of the 2003 summer season, the 1929 shell was replaced with a new, somewhat larger, acoustically improved shell, which had its debut in the 2004 summer season. Preservationists fiercely opposed the demolition for many years, citing the shell's storied history. However, even when it was built, the 1929 shell was (at least acoustically) only the third-best shell in the Bowl's history, behind its two immediate predecessors. By the late 1970s, the Hollywood Bowl became an acoustic liability because of continued hardening of its transite skin. The new shell incorporates design elements of not only the 1929 shell, but of both the Lloyd Wright shells. During the 2004 summer season, the sound steadily improved, as engineers learned to work with its live acoustics.

The current sound reinforcement system is a line-array configuration of multiple loudspeaker enclosures hung vertically in a curved manner, with the lower enclosures facing the front sections, and the upper enclosures angled towards the rear sections. It is manufactured by L-Acoustics, and includes state-of-the-art audio processing, allowing each individual loudspeaker enclosure to be "tuned" and directed towards the near-precise location of the listener, regardless of where in the venue they are sitting. This results in the audience in the rear sections hearing the same audio, at the same level, as in the front sections.

This electronic processing includes sound level, frequency equalization, occasional special effects, and time delay. Sound passes through wire much faster than through air, so the sound coming from the speakers must be delayed, allowing the actual sound from the stage to "catch up" so both sources reach the listeners' ears simultaneously. The system is maintained by Rat Sound Systems, the same company that has provided audio for the Coachella Festival, since its inception.

The 2004 shell incorporates the prominent front arch of the 1926 shell, the broad profile of the 1928 shell, and the unadorned white finish (and most of the general lines) of the 1929 shell. In addition, the ring-shaped structure hung within the shell, supporting lights and acoustic clouds, echoes a somewhat similar structure hung within the 1927 shell. During the 2004 season, because the back wall was not yet finished, a white curtain was hung at the back; beginning with the 2005 season, the curtain was removed to reveal a finished back wall. The architectural design for the shell was developed by the Los Angeles-based architectural practice Hodgetts + Fung, with the structural concept developed by the local office of Arup.

At the same time the new shell was being constructed, the bowl received four new video screens and towers. During most concerts, three remotely operated cameras in the shell, and a fourth, manually operated camera among the box seats, provide the audience with close-up views of the musicians.

On November 11, 2025, the Los Angeles Philharmonic named the concert stage after film composer John Williams, the first in the venue's 103-year history to have that honor.

== Hollywood Bowl Orchestra(s) ==
The Hollywood Bowl has had several house orchestras. A "Bowl Orchestra" performed in 1925, and a "Hollywood Bowl Orchestra" made a live recording in 1928. Later, the "Hollywood Bowl Symphony Orchestra" made several classical recordings under music director Leopold Stokowski from 1945 to 1946, and released a number of recordings on the Capitol Records label in the 1950s and 1960s.

The Hollywood Bowl Orchestra was re-launched by the Los Angeles Philharmonic Association in 1991 under principal conductor John Mauceri, who finished his tenure in 2006.

=== Early conductors ===
The first appointed conductor of the Bowl ensemble was Emil Oberhoffer, who served for one year. Oberhoffer was preceded by Alfred Hertz for two years. In 1925 Fritz Reiner migrated to the orchestra from the Cincinnati Symphony. Reiner was supplanted by Sir Henry Wood several years later. German-born Frederick Stark, who would later become a music librarian at Walt Disney Studios, occasionally served as conductor.

== Early ballet and opera ==
Ballet dancer Maud Allen performed during the production of the Pathétique Symphony by Tschaikowsky under the direction of Alfred Hertz in 1926. Ernest Belcher arranged a ballet scene for Bowl Dedication Night, and dancers from the Belcher Ballet School performed the Beautiful Galatea, Enchanted Hour, and Venesive Festival. In 1932, the Belcher's ballet was performed in Greek Costumes as a dedication to the Olympic-Games Athletes. Alexis and Theodore Kosloff performed the ballet Scheherazade with dancers from Hollywood and the Klosloff Dancing School. In 1932, Theodore Klosloff performed the Flower. Also in 1932, the ballet Chopiniana was performed.

Ballet Dancers Ruth St. Denis and Ted Shawn performed solo dances under direction of Hertz in 1927. Ruth St. Denis and Ted Shawn raised their arms to point at the California Stars during the Russian Ballet sur le point at the Hollywood Bowl. In 1928, Andreas Pavley, a tenor, and Serge Oukrainsky, a ballet dancer, performed at the Hollywood Bowl. Oukrainsky performed in the ballet La Fete a Robinson alone after Pavley's death. In 1929, Norma Gould brought her Los Angeles dancers to the bowl to perform during Schubert's Unfinished Symphony and Tschaikowsky's Nut-Cracker Suite. In August 1930, Michio Ito brought five dancers to the Hollywood Bowl to perform in the Russian Ballet Prince Igor. In 1931, Adolph Bolm performed at the Bowl for Debussy's Les Nuages. He also performed The Spirt factory. This was later called the Mechanical Ballet, composed by Alaxander Mosolov. Dancers Elise Reiman and Robert Bell also performed in the Mechanical Ballet.

In 1931, Los Angeles Grand Opera performed segments of Marouf. Early Hollywood Bowl appearances of opera include Carmen, Aida, and Shanewis. In 1929, a concertized form of the opera Carmen was performed by Alice Genytle, Paul Althouse and Alexander Kisselburgh. The same cast later performed moments from the opera Tannhäuser. In 1932, Samson and Delilah was performed by Paul Althouse, local singers, the Belcher Ballet and the Civic Chorus in concert style. In 1927, Elsa Alsen performed Santuzza in Cavalleria.

In 1934, Nina Koshetz performed Carmen and Nelson Eddy sang Escamillo in the opera Carmen. Koshetz also sang the lead in Tschaikowsky's Eugene Onegin. In the 1930s, Verdi's Aida was performed by Dan Gridley, Clemence Gifford, Eleanor Woodforde and Richard Bonelli with the Los Angeles Philharmonic Orchestra. In 1935, Lohengrin was performed, with Jeanette Vreeland performing Elsa and Dan Gridley performing Lonhengrin.

== Performances ==
The first season at the Hollywood Bowl began on July 11, 1922, with conductor Alfred Hertz and the Los Angeles Philharmonic.

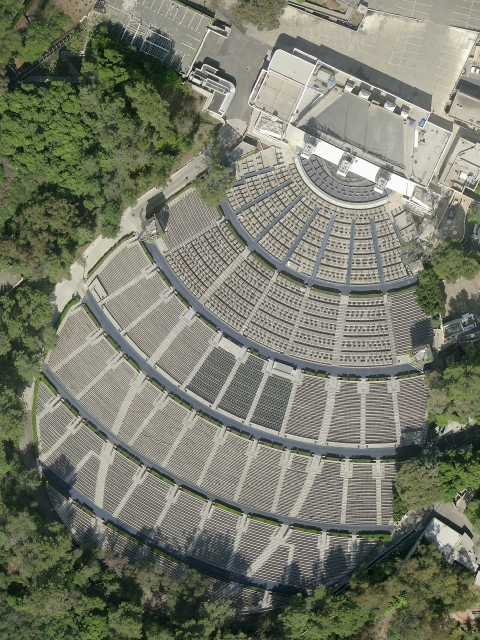
2012 aerial photograph showing the seating of the Hollywood Bowl

In 1945, Leopold Stokowski formed the Hollywood Bowl Symphony Orchestra, drawing its players from among members of the Los Angeles Philharmonic and various film studios orchestras. He made a number of 78 rpm recordings with them for RCA Victor during his two seasons there (1945–46) before returning to New York. The Hollywood Bowl Symphony's name was retained for a series of Capitol LPs made in the 1950s under such conductors as Felix Slatkin and Carmen Dragon.

In 1951, a financial crisis closed the Hollywood Bowl during its summer season. Dorothy Chandler chaired a committee that organized a series of fundraising concerts that was able to reopen it.

The film-and-orchestra concert Bugs Bunny on Broadway, subsequently called "Bugs Bunny at the Symphony," has played the Hollywood Bowl a record 21 times—19 times with the Los Angeles Philharmonic, and twice with the Hollywood Bowl Orchestra, all conducted by George Daugherty. In September 2003, "Bugs Bunny On Broadway" was the final Los Angeles Philharmonic concert to be performed in the 1929 shell before its demolition started the following day, making way for the new shell.

=== 1920s ===
- Tsianina Redfeather Blackstone sang the role of Shanewis in the opera Shanewis in 1926.
- Rafaela Díaz performed in 1926 as Lionel in Charles Wakefields Cadman's Indian-themed opera "Shanewis."

=== 1930s ===
- Claude Lapham's Japanese-inspired opera Sakura premieres with 2,000 performers, and an audience of 10,000. The premiere on June 24, 1933, starred Miyoshi Sugimachi and was a significant moment for Japanese culture in America before World War II. The premiere was followed up by another performance on July 7 that same year.
- August 7, 1936: The Hollywood Bowl set an attendance record of 26,410 at a performance by French opera star Lily Pons
- September 1936: The Bowl's shell was dismantled to make room for Kay Nielsen's enormous sets in Irving Thalberg's spectacular production of George Sterling's The Play of Everyman, featuring a cast of 500.

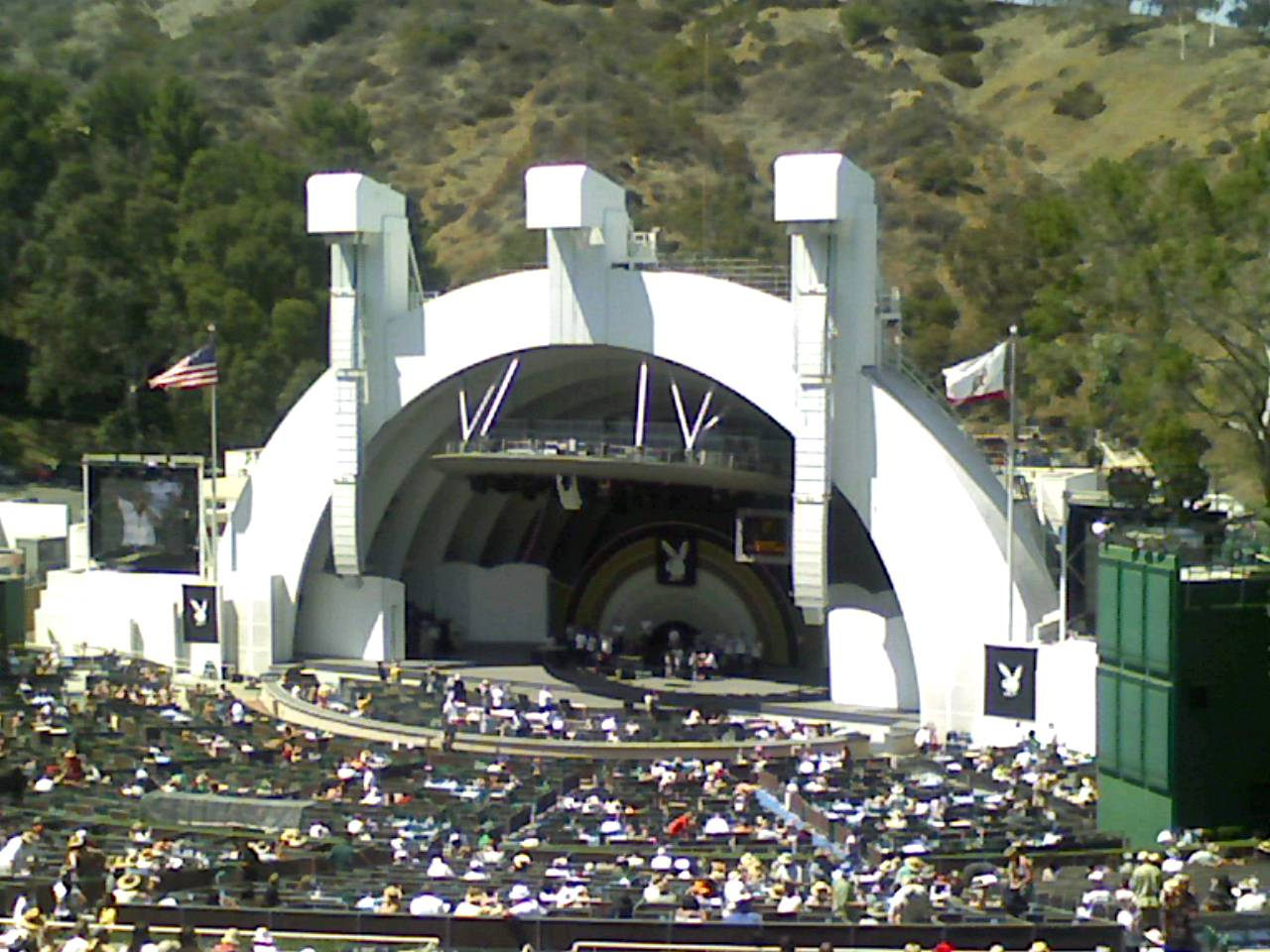
Playboy Jazz Festival hosted in the Hollywood Bowl 2007

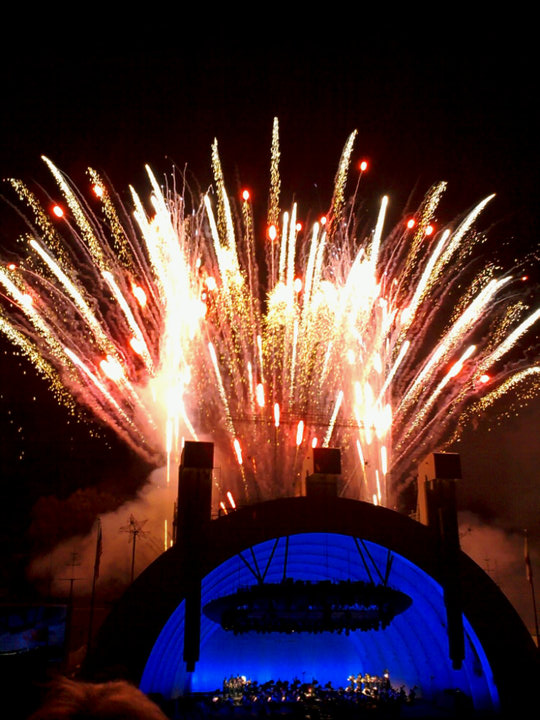
July 4 Fireworks Spectacular at the Hollywood Bowl 2010

=== 1940s ===
- Bass baritone George London made his opera début in 1941 singing Dr. Grenvil in La Traviata.
- American soprano Florence Quartararo made her début as Leonora in a concert performance of Il trovatore in 1945.

=== 1950s ===
- September 1950: California's official state centennial show, The California Story, ran for five performances. The production, directed by Vladimir Rosing, was immense. A chorus of 200 and hundreds of actors were employed. The shell of the bowl was removed, the stage was enlarged, and the action was expanded to include the surrounding hillsides. Lionel Barrymore provided the show's dramatic narration.
- August 15, 1956: A Jazz at the Philharmonic program featuring Louis Armstrong and His All Stars, Ella Fitzgerald, Art Tatum, and Oscar Peterson became the best-attended event of the venue's history.
- American Baritone Mack Harrell performed in the US première of "David" in 1956.

=== 1960s ===
- The Beatles performed in 1964 and 1965, which resulted in the live album The Beatles at the Hollywood Bowl that was released in 1977. This recording was re-released in 2016 with the screams of the fans significantly reduced and sound improved with new technology by Giles Martin.
- April 29, 1967: The Supremes performed as the headliners for KHJ (AM) 2nd Annual Appreciation Concert. Their performance is notable as it was the first time Cindy Birdsong stood in for an absent Florence Ballard.
- July 5, 1968: L.A. rock band The Doors performed at the Hollywood Bowl, with Steppenwolf and The Chambers Brothers as their opening acts. Recordings from this show were released in 1987 as the live album Live at the Hollywood Bowl.
- August 23, 1968: Simon & Garfunkel performed a 24-song set, later released unofficially outside the United States, notably in 1994 by Australian label Vigotone under the title Voices of Intelligent Dissent.
- September 14, 1968: The Jimi Hendrix Experience appeared at the Hollywood Bowl. This concert was recorded and eventually released as part of the 50th anniversary box set of Electric Ladyland.

=== 1970s ===
- August 22, 1971: The Jackson 5 performed at this venue on their Second National Tour
- June 17, 1972: Ron "Pigpen" McKernan played his last show with the Grateful Dead.
- July 29, 1973: The World of Sid & Marty Krofft, a one-performance-only live show was filmed here and aired as a television special The World of Sid & Marty Krofft at the Hollywood Bowl. The show featured performances by Johnny Whitaker, Jack Wild with H.R. Pufnstuf characters and The Brady Bunch Kids.
- September 7, 1973: Elton John played a concert here that was filmed for inclusion in the Bryan Forbes documentary film Elton John and Bernie Taupin Say Goodbye Norma Jean and Other Things.
- 1979: the inaugural Playboy Jazz Festival was held. It has taken place at the Hollywood Bowl ever since.
- Pink Floyd played the venue in 1972.

=== 1980s ===
- 1980: The Monty Python comedy troupe performs. A filmed performance is released as Monty Python Live at the Hollywood Bowl.
- March 1989: Eddie Money performs at the Hollywood Bowl for the first time. Money continued to perform there annually until he died in 2019.

=== 1990s ===
- July 2–4, 1991: The newly formed Hollywood Bowl Orchestra made their debut performance with Independence Day concerts on conducted by John Mauceri. The program included works by Aaron Copland, Leonard Bernstein, John Williams, George Gershwin & Jerome Kern, among others.
- On August 25, 1991, Miles Davis performed what would be his final appearance at the Bowl.

=== 2000s ===
- July 1, 2002: The Who performed their first concert after the death of John Entwistle.
- October 1 and 2, 2007: Dave Matthews Band performs #34 with lyrics for the first time since 1993, in honor of frontman Dave Matthews' wife's 34th birthday.

=== 2010s ===
- July 22 & 23, 2011: Dolly Parton made her Hollywood Bowl debut as part of her Better Day tour.
- November 8, 2013: Avicii performed at the Hollywood Bowl, becoming the first EDM artist to headline the venue.
- June 4, 2014: Barry Gibb performed at the Hollywood Bowl, on his Mythology Tour, his first and only solo tour, performing classic hits of the Bee Gees.
- September 25–26, 2015: Kanye West performed his fourth studio album, 808s & Heartbreak (2008), in full for the first time ever.
- October 2 and 4, 2015: Van Halen performed at the Hollywood Bowl to conclude their 2015 Tour. These would be the last concerts guitarist Eddie Van Halen would perform live before his death on October 6, 2020.
- July 1, 2016: Garrison Keillor recorded his final episode of A Prairie Home Companion from the Hollywood Bowl which was later released as a Live CD.
- October 14 and 15, 2016: Kygo performed during his Cloud Nine Tour. The concerts were filmed in the documentary: "Kygo: Live at the Hollywood Bowl".
- September 21, 22, 25, 2017: Tom Petty and the Heartbreakers completed their 40th Anniversary World Tour; final shows of Petty's career before his death on October 2.
- October 12, 2017, Depeche Mode played the first of 4 consecutive sold out nights at the Hollywood Bowl, as part of their Global Spirit Tour, becoming the first band to ever sell out 4 consecutive nights at the venue.
- October 27, 2017: Linkin Park held a tribute concert for Chester Bennington
- May 12, 2018: The Iranian singer Googoosh along with the singers and songwriters Hassan Shamaizadeh and Martik Kanian performed their Memory Makers Tour. Googoosh became the first Iranian artist to headline at the Hollywood Bowl.

=== 2020s ===
- May 13, 2020: Due to the COVID-19 pandemic, the entire season of film screenings and concerts was cancelled for the first time.
- 2021: Billie Eilish held a no-audience concert in support of her second studio album, Happier Than Ever, for a concert film titled Happier Than Ever: A Love Letter to Los Angeles, featuring accompaniment by a full orchestra, that released on Disney+ on September 3.
- October 8, 2021: Burna Boy made his debut at the bowl as a part of his 2021 Space Drift arena tour. He became the first African artist to headline a concert at the Bowl
- November 2-3, 2021: Tame Impala held two sold-out shows as part of the tour for his album The Slow Rush.
- May 4, 2022: Dave Chappelle performed as part of the Netflix Is a Joke Festival and was attacked on stage by an armed audience member. Chappelle was uninjured and the suspect was arrested by the LAPD. The performance tied Chappelle with Monty Python for the most headlined shows for a comedian at the venue.
- a-ha concluded their 'Hunting High and Low' tour on 31st July 2022 with the Hollywood Bowl Orchestra for a final concert playing a mix of classic hit songs.https://www.hollywoodbowl.com/events/performances/1728/2022-07-31/a-ha-with-orchestra.
- July 16, 2023: Sparks concluded the North American leg of the tour in support of their album The Girl Is Crying in Her Latte, their first performance at the venue, with opening act They Might Be Giants. The performance was a landmark in the history of the band, representing the culmination of a late-career surge in popularity due to the documentary The Sparks Brothers by filmmaker Edgar Wright, who was in attendance at the Bowl.
- November 15 and 17, 2023: Mariah Carey performed two sold-out shows as part of her 2023 holiday tour Merry Christmas One and All!.
- October 17, 2025: Shawn Mendes performed a sold-out show for his final performance from his On The Road Again Tour.
- August 22, 2026: Foo Fighters performed a sold-out show with the LA Philharmonic to celebrate Gustavo Dudamel's penultimate performance before heading to New York.
- October 16 and 18, 2026: Miley Cyrus played two sold-out shows for her tenth studio album Bass Persuades.
- October 21, 23, 24, 30, and 31, 2026: My Chemical Romance performs 5 sold out shows, playing their third studio album The Black Parade in its entirety with Broadway style acting with full sets, acting, and storylines. This performance serves as the conclusion to their Long Live The Black Parade tour.

== Hollywood Bowl Museum ==
The Hollywood Bowl Museum is located at the bottom of Peppertree Lane. It was formerly known as the Tea Room which opened in 1984. In 1996, it was rebuilt as the Edmund D. Edelman Hollywood Bowl Museum. It features many historical exhibits including: Summer Nights: Jazz at the Bowl, Hollywood Bowl: Music For Everyone, Postcards from the Bowl, Beatles at the Bowl, Concert Programs and Live from the Bowl. These exhibits feature vintage photographs, vintage sound equipment, newspaper clippings, postcards, live video recordings, and live audio recordings.

The Hollywood Bowl Museum also features memorabilia and artifacts about the history of the Hollywood Bowl and performances. The museum includes the Hollywood Bowl Hall of Fame, whose honorees include John Williams, Reba McEntire, Garth Brooks, Stevie Wonder, Brian Wilson, Henry Mancini, Sarah Chang, Bernadette Peters, George Harrison, Frank Sinatra and more. The Hollywood Bowl Museum offers free admission, free self-guided tour options, free guided tour options and educational programs. The educational program, Music Mobile, is a volunteer program and offers musical instrument lessons to students twice a year. If the Hollywood Bowl Museum is closed visitors can walk through "The Bowl Walk" which features historical photographs of the Hollywood Bowl.

== Green initiatives ==
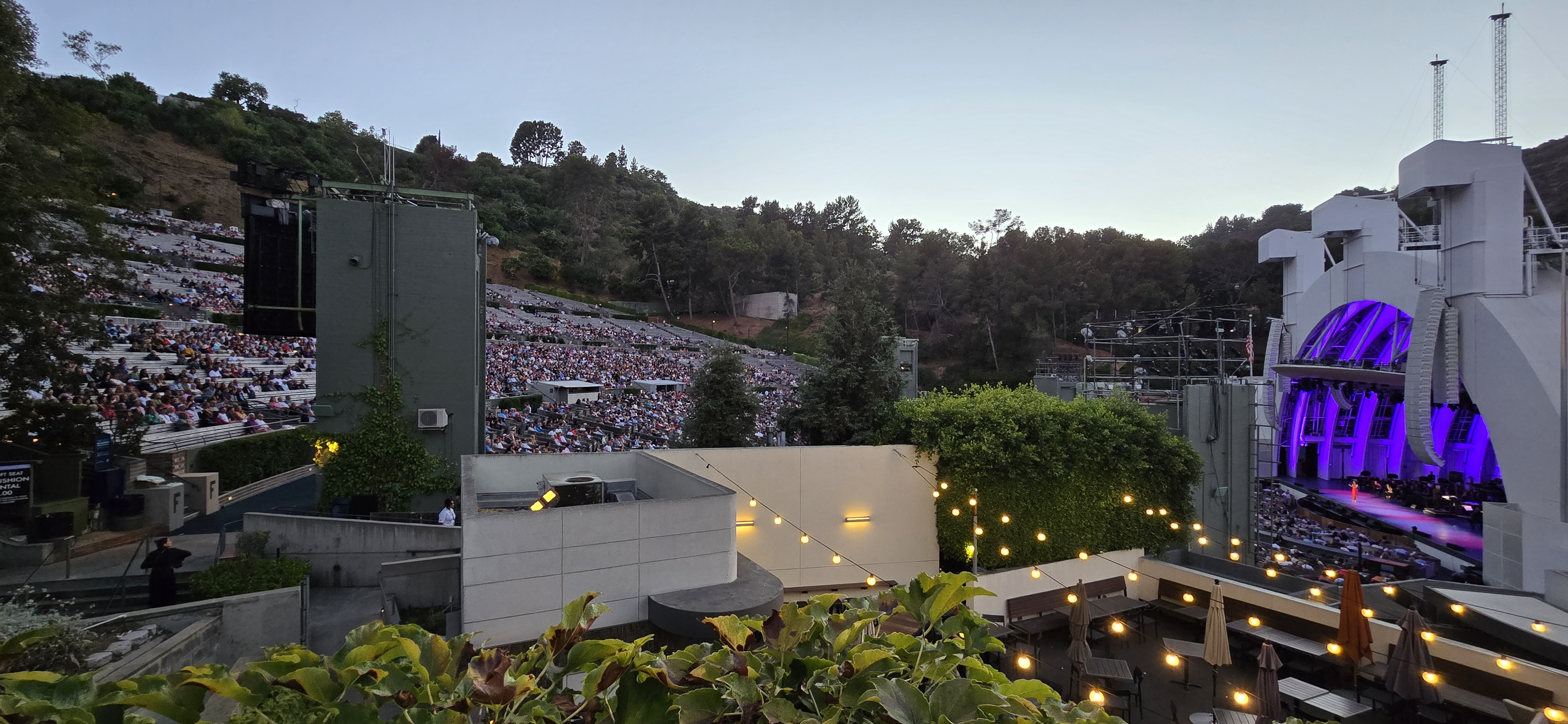
The view of the Hollywood Bowl and its band shell during a performance in 2024. The Backyard, one of the Hollywood Bowl's two restaurants, is in the foreground.

The Hollywood Bowl is the first amphitheater in California to be certified as an Audubon Society Cooperative Sanctuary. Los Angeles Philharmonic Association and Los Angeles County are partners with the Hollywood Bowl and encourage recycling. The Hollywood Bowl has many recycling bins located throughout the venue. The Hollywood Bowl has also partnered with Los Angeles County Metropolitan Transportation Authority (formerly Southern California Rapid Transit District) since 1953 and provides the public with green alternatives to driving, including shuttle buses. Know Before You Go is provided as a detailed guide offering public transport information and free bike parking options. The Hollywood Bowl has waterless urinals and flush-reducing toilets to preserve water as well as a satellite-based irrigation system to control water use. This irrigation system also provides water based on the needs of animal life. The Hollywood Bowl has stainless steel grates and water filters to keep its irrigation system clean.

In 2024, the Hollywood Bowl reduced on-site parking and introduced a rideshare parking lot. Parking fees were increased and more shuttles offered.

Metro has proposed a new station on the K line at the Hollywood Bowl, north of the existing Hollywood/Highland station on the B line.

== In popular culture ==
The Vinewood Bowl, which appears in the 2013 video game Grand Theft Auto V, is heavily inspired by the Hollywood Bowl.

Many films and television shows have been filmed in the Hollywood Bowl, including Jazz Mad, A Star Is Born, Hollywood Hotel, Anchors Aweigh, Clay Pigeon, Hollywood or Bust, Columbo, Some Kind of Wonderful and more.

Several animated cartoons from the golden age of American animation, including Long Haired Hare, Rabbit of Seville, Baton Bunny, and Tom and Jerry in the Hollywood Bowl, feature the Hollywood Bowl.

== See also ==
- Live at the Hollywood Bowl (disambiguation)
- List of contemporary amphitheatres
- List of Los Angeles Historic-Cultural Monuments in Hollywood
- Hatch Memorial Shell
- National Bowl
- Waikiki Shell
- CNE Bandshell
- Korean Music Festival
