= Marston, Van Pelt & Maybury =

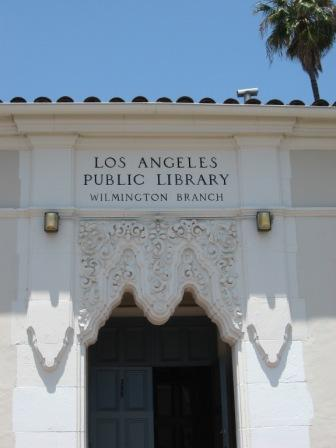
Wilmington Branch library detail

Marston, Van Pelt, & Maybury and associated partnership names were architects in Pasadena, California. The partners were Sylvanus Marston, Garrett Van Pelt, and Edgar Maybury. A number of their works are listed in the National Register of Historic Places.

== Partners ==
Marston, Van Pelt & Maybury's partners were Sylvanus Marston (1883-1946), Garrett Van Pelt (1879-1972) and Edgar Maybury. The firm designed hundreds of homes in Pasadena, California and its surrounding communities.

== Projects ==
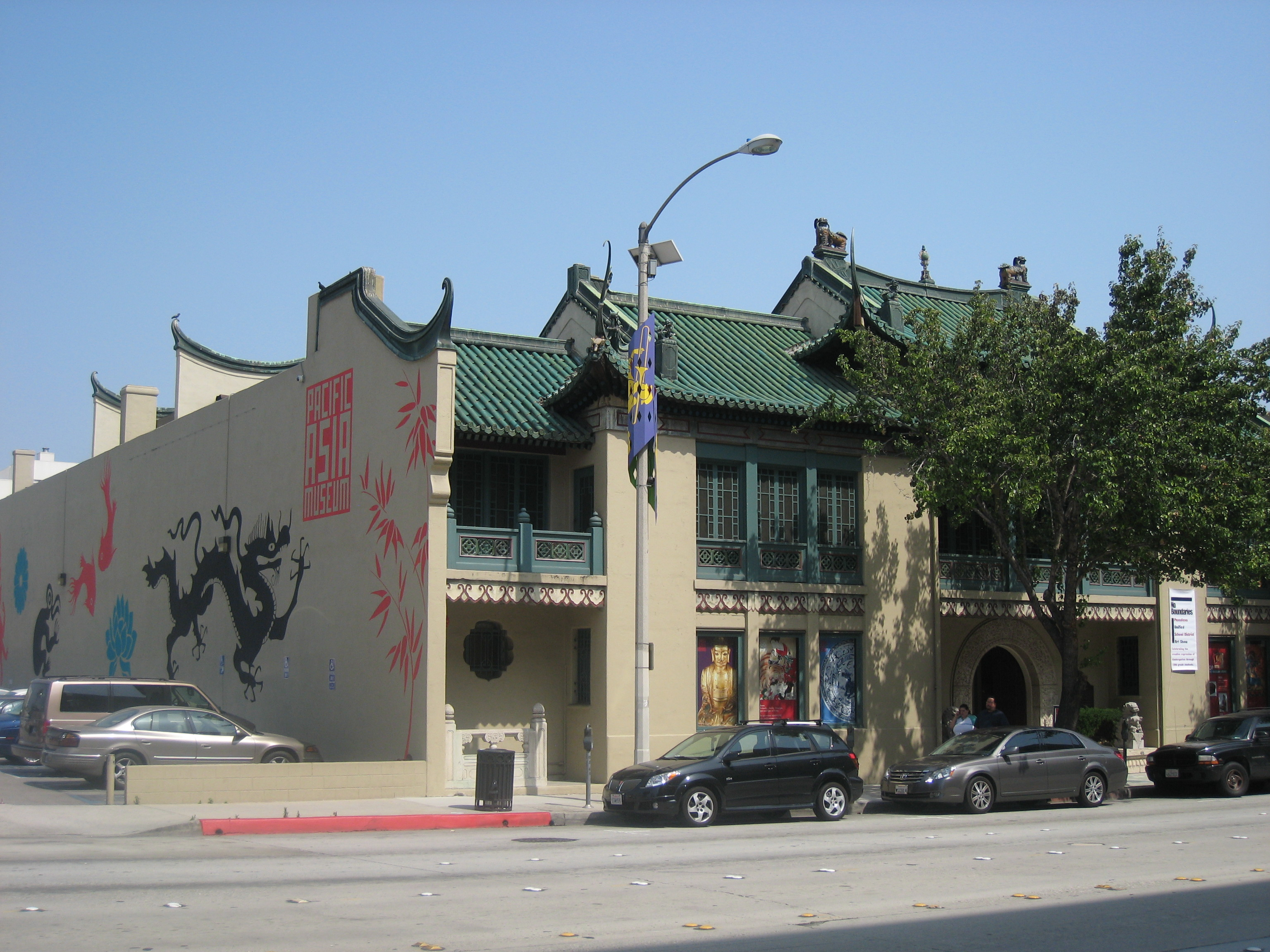
Grace Nicholson Building, home of USC Pacific Asia Museum

Marston, Van Pelt & Maybury works include (in Pasadena, California unless otherwise noted):

=== National Register of Historic Places ===
- Fenyes Estate (1911 addition)
- Vista del Arroyo Hotel and Bungalows (1920)
- Home Laundry (1922)
- Grace Nicholson Building (1926)
- Villa Verde (1927)
- Wilmington Branch, Los Angeles (1927)
- The Bishop Estate, Rancho Santa Fe

=== Other ===
- Arden Villa (1913)
- Ferdinand R. Bain House, Los Angeles (1925)
- Winter home of Josephine P. Everett (1928)
