= Cicada (disambiguation) =

Cicada is a superfamily of insects, as well as a genus within that group; Cicada (genus).

Cicada may also refer to:

== Music ==
- Cicada (British band), English electronic music group
  - Cicada (Cicada album), the 2006 debut album by Cicada, and its track "Cicadas"
- Cicada (Japanese band), a Japanese trip-hop band
- Cicada (Hazmat Modine album), a 2011 album by Hazmat Modine, and its title track
- "Cicada", a song by Silverchair from Frogstomp, 1995
- "Cicada", a song by La Luz from Floating Features, 2018
- "Cicada", a song by Sega Bodega from Romeo, 2021
- "The Cicada's Song", a song by Autopilot Off from Make a Sound, 2004
- "Cicada", a song by Good Kid from Can We Hang Out Sometime?, 2026

== Other uses ==
- Cicada variant, a nickname for the SARS-CoV-2 BA.3.2 Omicron subvariant.
- Cicada (character), a villain of The Flash comic book series
- Cicada 3301, a series of cryptographic puzzles that were posted on the internet in the mid 2010s
- Cicada (mythology), several references in classical literature
- Cicada (horse) (1959–1981), an American Hall of Fame racehorse
- Cicada (2020 film), an American film
- Cicada (2024 film), a Malayalam film
- Cicadas (2025 film) a German–France film
- "Cicada" (Slow Horses), a TV episode
- Cicada, an alternative spelling for Tsikada, a Russian satellite navigation system established in 1974
- Cycada (compatibility layer), an unreleased iOS app compatibility layer for Android
- Exeirus, the Australian cicada killer wasp
