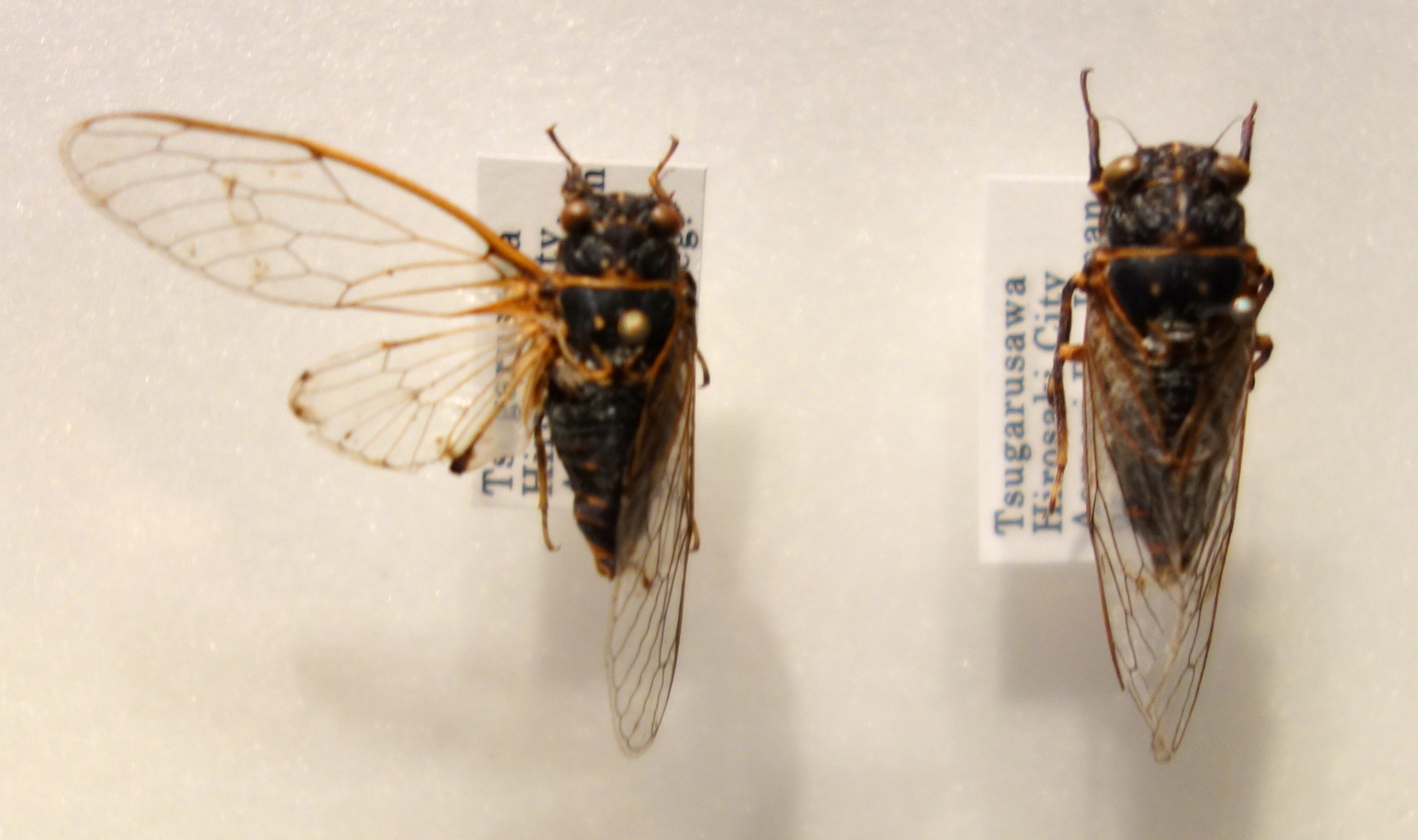
- Cicadetta radiator - National Museum of Nature and Science, Tokyo

Scientific classification
- Kingdom: Animalia
- Phylum: Arthropoda
- Class: Insecta
- Order: Hemiptera
- Suborder: Auchenorrhyncha
- Family: Cicadidae
- Tribe: Cicadettini
- Genus: Cicadetta; Kolenati, 1857

Synonyms
- Cicadetta Amyot, 1847; Cicadette [sic] Kolenati, 1857; Sicadetta Kolenati, 1857 and other orthographic variants

= Cicadetta =

Genus of true bugs

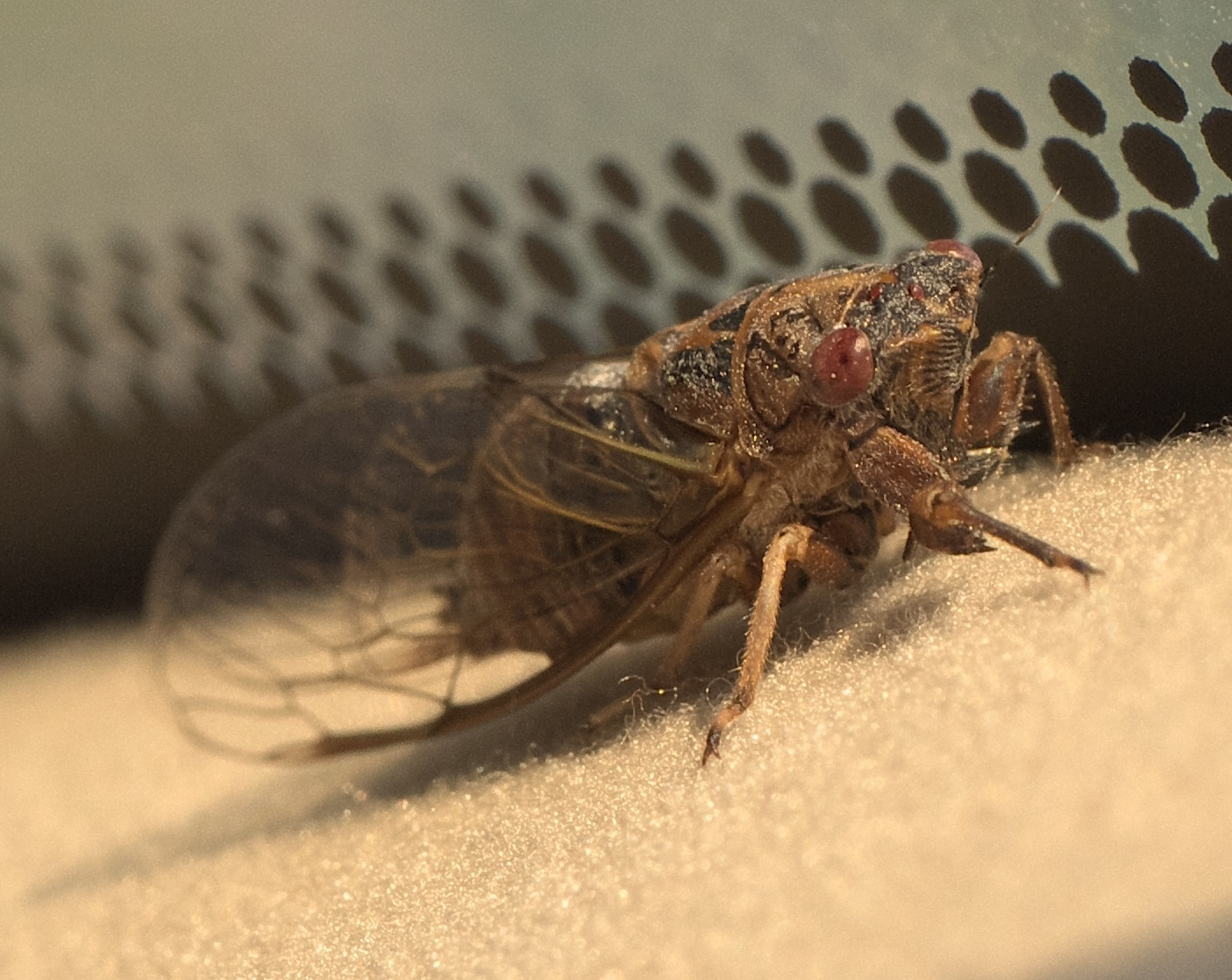
Cicadetta calliope

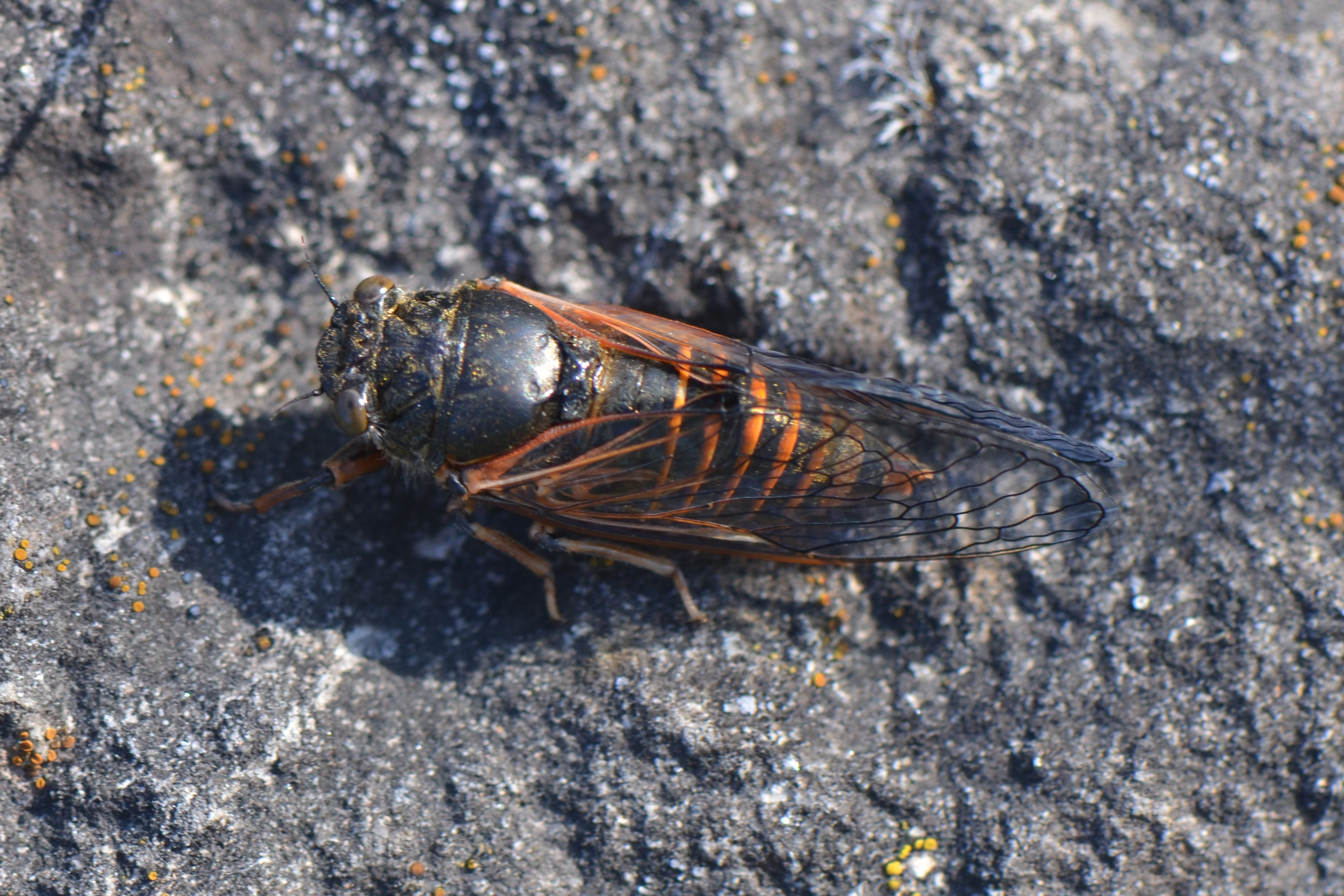
Cicadetta brevipennis

Cicadetta is a genus of generally small-bodied annual cicadas widespread across portions of the Palearctic, Indomalayan, North African and Australian realms. In older scientific and taxonomic literature, this genus was popularly referred to as Melampsalta. These cicadas occur in a diverse spectrum of habitats, although most taxa are typically associated with weedy meadows and tallgrass prairie ecosystems. Several related species from North America were recently (2017) transferred to the genus Cicadettana.

== Distribution and conservation status ==
Many members of the genus inhabit Southern Europe, Greece, Anatolia, and coastal Mediterranean regions, and they have a long history of association with the civilizations of those areas; revered by many cultures for their complex, loud, and sometimes melodic courtship calls. In addition, species have been recorded from North Africa, Asia and Australia.

Most of the cicadas within this genus are classified by conservation groups as least concern, although many species are endemic to a particular isolated area or threatened by habitat loss primarily due to grazing. Cicadetta montana, the type species, is the only cicada to occur in the British Isles and parts of Scandinavia; however, it is more common in warmer areas of mainland Europe, where it is one of a species complex.

== Species ==
The genus Cicadetta includes:

1. Cicadetta abscondita Lee, 2008
2. Cicadetta afghanistanica Dlabola, 1964
3. Cicadetta albipennis Fieber, 1876
4. Cicadetta anapaistica Hertach, 2011
5. Cicadetta brevipennis Fieber, 1876
6. Cicadetta cantilatrix Sueur & Puissant, 2007
7. Cicadetta cerdaniensis Puissant & Boulard, 2000
8. Cicadetta chaharensis (Kato, 1938)
9. Cicadetta concinna (Germar, 1821)
  (synonym C. podolica (Eichwald, 1830))
10. Cicadetta diminuta Horváth, 1907
11. Cicadetta dirfica Gogala, Trilar & Drosopoulos, 2011
12. Cicadetta fangoana Boulard, 1976
13. Cicadetta fraseri (China, 1938)
14. Cicadetta haematophleps Fieber, 1876
15. Cicadetta hageni Fieber, 1872
16. Cicadetta hannekeae Gogala, Drosopoulos & Trilar, 2008
17. Cicadetta hodoharai (Kato, 1940)
18. Cicadetta inglisi (Ollenbach, 1929)
19. Cicadetta inserta Horváth, 1911
20. Cicadetta intermedia (Ollenbach, 1929)
21. Cicadetta juncta (Walker, 1850)
22. Cicadetta kissavi Gogala, Drosopoulos & Trilar, 2009
23. Cicadetta kollari Fieber, 1876
24. Cicadetta konoi (Kato, 1937)
25. Cicadetta laevifrons (Stål, 1870)
26. Cicadetta macedonica Schedl, 1999
27. Cicadetta mediterranea Fieber, 1876
28. Cicadetta minuta (Ollenbach, 1929)
29. Cicadetta montana (Scopoli, 1772)
  - type species
30. Cicadetta nigropilosa Logvinenko, 1976
31. Cicadetta olympica Gogala, Drosopoulos & Trilar, 2009
32. Cicadetta pellosoma (Uhler, 1861)
33. Cicadetta petrophila Popov, Arnov & Sergeeva, 1985
34. Cicadetta petryi Schumacher, 1924
35. Cicadetta pieli (Kato, 1940)
36. Cicadetta pilosa Horváth, 1901
37. Cicadetta shansiensis (Esaki & Ishihara, 1950)
38. Cicadetta sibillae Hertach & Trilar, 2015
39. Cicadetta transylvanica Fieber, 1876
40. Cicadetta tumidifrons Horváth, 1911
41. Cicadetta tunisiaca (Karsch, 1890)
42. Cicadetta ventricosa (Stål, 1866)
43. Cicadetta viridicincta (Ashton, 1912)
44. Cicadetta walkerella Kirkaldy, 1909
