= Alice (company) =

Israeli-American cybersecurity firm

- Type: Private
- Industry: Cybersecurity
- Founded: 2018; 8 years ago
- Founders: Noam Schwartz (CEO); Alon Porat; Eyal Dykan; Iftach Orr
- Headquarters: New York City
- Products: WonderSuite; WonderBuild; WonderFence; WonderCheck
- Number of employees: 250+
- Website: alice.io

Alice, formerly ActiveFence, is an Israeli-American artificial intelligence safety company. Founded in 2018 by Noam Schwartz, Alon Porat, Eyal Dykan and Iftach Orr, the company is co-headquartered in New York City and Tel Aviv, Israel. It assists technology companies to track content such as disinformation, hate speech, fraud, and child abuse, across user-generated content platforms and generative AI systems.

Alice's clients include NVIDIA, Amazon, TikTok, and Cohere. Its technology has been used by The New York Times.

== History ==
ActiveFence was founded in 2018 by Noam Schwartz, Alon Porat, Eyal Dykan and Iftach Orr. Schwartz, who had earlier founded the data startup Tapdog (acquired by SimilarWeb), while mapping the Internet's most popular file hosting services, he discovered a folder containing child sexual abuse content and decided to build an AI solution to stop such incidents from happening again.

The company grew its staff from roughly 60 employees to approximately 200 across six offices by mid-2021.

In July 2021, ActiveFence raised $100 million in funding, including a Series B led by CRV and Highland Capital Partners, and a previously unannounced Series A led by Grove Ventures and Norwest Venture Partners. The company's valuation at the time was reported at $500 million.

In March 2023, ActiveFence acquired Rewire, a London-based startup founded in 2021 by Bertie Vidgen and Paul Röttger.

In September 2023, ActiveFence acquired Spectrum Labs, a Miami-based startup valued at $137M that developed contextual AI content moderation for text.

In January 2026, they rebranded to Alice as the company's products expanded its focus to security with AI models.
