= Sudip Roy (computer scientist) =

Computer scientist

- Occupation: Technology Executive
- Organization: Adaption
- Known for: Co-founding Adaption Labs
- Title: Chief Technology Officer

Sudip Roy is a computer scientist and technology executive. He is the co-founder and chief technology officer of Adaption. He has worked on large-scale machine learning systems at organizations including Google DeepMind and Cohere.

== Education ==
Roy earned a PhD in Computer Science from Cornell University. He holds a B.Tech in Computer Science and Engineering from the Indian Institute of Technology (IIT), Kharagpur.

== Career ==
Sudip worked at Google Brain (now part of Google DeepMind) on systems research and large-scale data management. During his tenure, he contributed to infrastructure projects including Pathways and TensorFlow Extended, which support training and inference workflows for production machine learning models.

He later served as Senior Director of Engineering at Cohere, leading work on inference infrastructure and fine-tuning systems.

In late 2025, he co-founded the company Adaption Labs with Sara Hooker. The company focuses on developing AI systems designed for continuous learning and adaptation.

Roy’s research spans systems for AI and AI for systems, including work on optimizing system performance and compilers. His publications have appeared in conferences such as MLSys, NeurIPS, SIGMOD, and KDD. He has been a program committee member or reviewer for the conferences SIGMOD, VLDB, ICDE, and MLSys.

== Awards ==
He is the recipient of the MLSys Outstanding Paper Award (2022) and the SIGMOD Best Paper Award (2011). He holds multiple patents in machine learning systems, including methods for learned graph optimizations and neural network-based device placement.

== See also ==
- Cohere
- Google DeepMind
