= Good Kid =

Canadian indie rock band

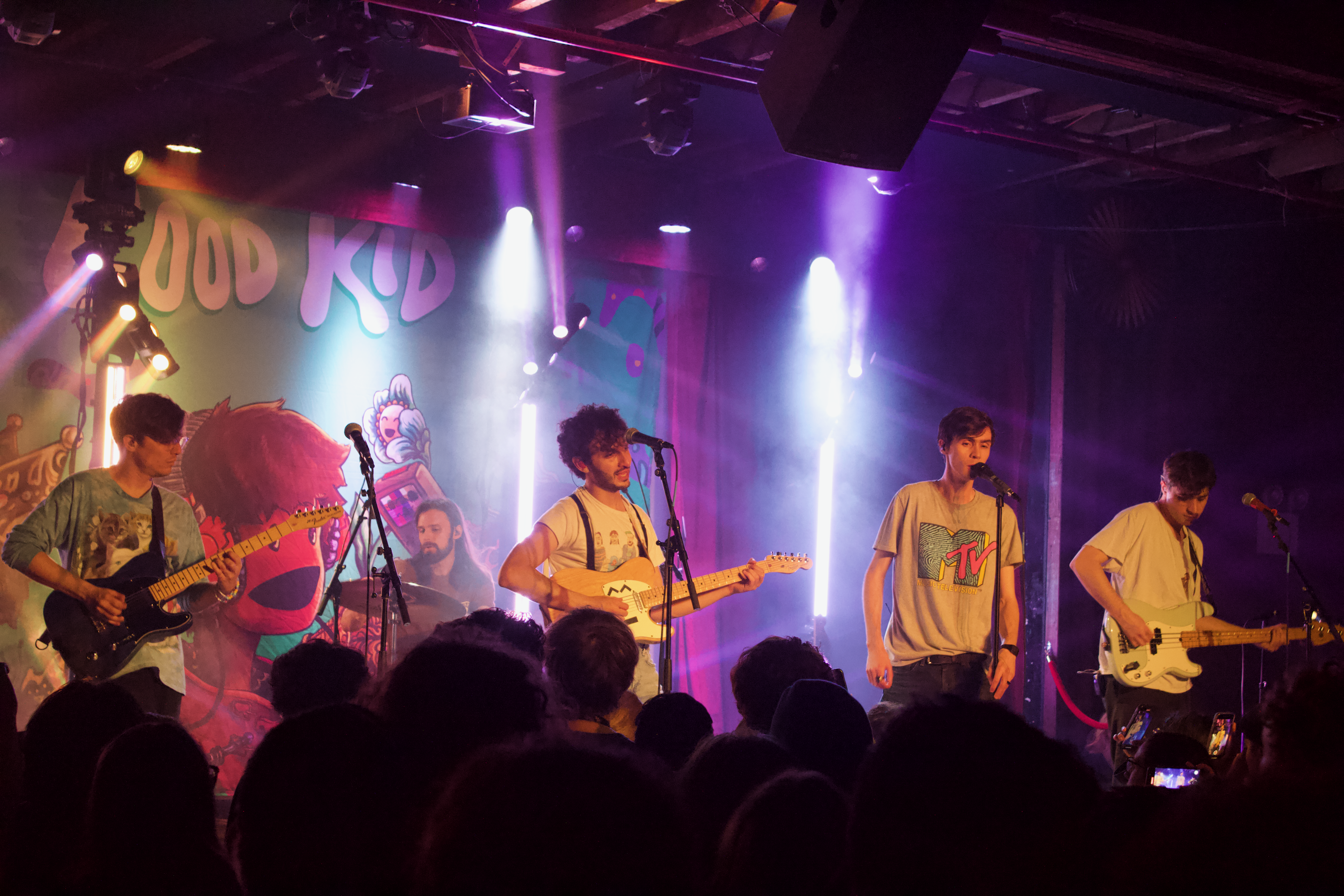
- Good Kid performing at The Bell House in Brooklyn in 2023

Background information
- Origin: Toronto, Ontario, Canada
- Genre: Indie rock
- Years active: 2015–present
- Spinoff of: Streets Ahead
- Members: Nick Frosst; Jon Kereliuk; Michael Kozakov; David Wood; Jacob Tsafatinos
- Website: goodkidofficial.com

Good Kid is a Canadian indie rock band from Toronto, Ontario. It consists of five members: lead vocalist Nick Frosst, bassist Michael Kozakov, drummer Jon Kereliuk, guitarists David Wood and Jacob Tsafatinos. The band's mascot, known as Nomu Kid, is primarily featured in their marketing and social media. The band released their first single in 2015, their self-titled first EP in 2018. In late 2020, the band gained popularity through the use of their music on the internet, particularly on Fortnite streams. The band has chosen not to issue DMCA strikes so that their music could be used in streams. Good Kid primarily releases music in the form of singles, later bundled into self-titled, sequentially numbered EPs with additional tracks. They released their first album Can We Hang Out Sometime? in 2026, at which point they were "not far off" from being the largest indie band in the world according to Dork.

== History ==
=== 2015–2020: Formation and Good Kid 1–2 ===
Good Kid was formed in 2015 as a hobby while all of its members were studying, primarily computer science, at the University of Toronto. Prior to forming Good Kid, Wood and Tsafatinos played together in a band called Streets Ahead, titled after a reference to Community. Frosst had also played in a prior band, which played music featuring a glockenspiel he described as "weird". Good Kid's first song, "Nomu", was released on October 13, 2015 and garnered initial attention from users of Reddit. It introduced the band's mascot, Nomu Kid, who was named after the song. Nomu Kid was created by artist Gabriel Altrows, who has continued to work with the band since. Their first EP, titled Good Kid, released on June 15, 2018.

In 2020, the band released their second EP, Good Kid 2. Its lead track, "Down With the King", was based on Donkey Kong Country; the lyrics describe the singer being stuck on the game and calling their friend for help. Following the release of Good Kid 2, Good Kid launched an alternate reality game on social media to promote a tie-in browser game called Ghost King's Revenge. The premise was that their mascot, Nomu Kid, had gone missing, and was captured by the antagonist of the game. Ghost King's Revenge featured a soundtrack consisting of both original music and chiptune arrangements of every Good Kid song featured on Good Kid and Good Kid 2.

=== 2021–2025: Rise, tours, and Good Kid 3–4 ===
In mid-2021, Good Kid experienced a surge of popularity with the Fortnite community. Fortnite streamers would often play Good Kid music in their streams, introducing it to their viewers. This extended to high-profile players such as Bugha and members of the esports organization FaZe Clan. The band members began participating in these streams by promoting Fortnite gameplay montages that included their music on social media. Fortnite players campaigned for Good Kid music to be added to the in-game radio. In response, Epic Games asked Good Kid to submit two of their songs for inclusion. Epic Games settled on "Witches", which was added that June, to positive reception by the band. Their song "Orbit" would also be added in late October of that same year. "No Time to Explain" would also be added in late 2022. By September 2022, Good Kid was selling out shows across the United States and had over 425,000 monthly Spotify listeners.

In response to controversy over DMCA claims, and the number of people including their music in streams, Good Kid said it would not issue takedowns against streamers. According to Tsafatinos, this reaction came from the band's observation that most streamers were young people who "just wanna play the music that they like on stream", and likely did not know about the DMCA system. A separate interview in 2024 with Tsafatinos later clarified that data showed that it was more financially viable for Good Kid to allow others to freely use their music on YouTube than if they were to monetize it through YouTube's Content ID system, as the editors of several larger creators would use their music and the band would achieve further growth through those videos.

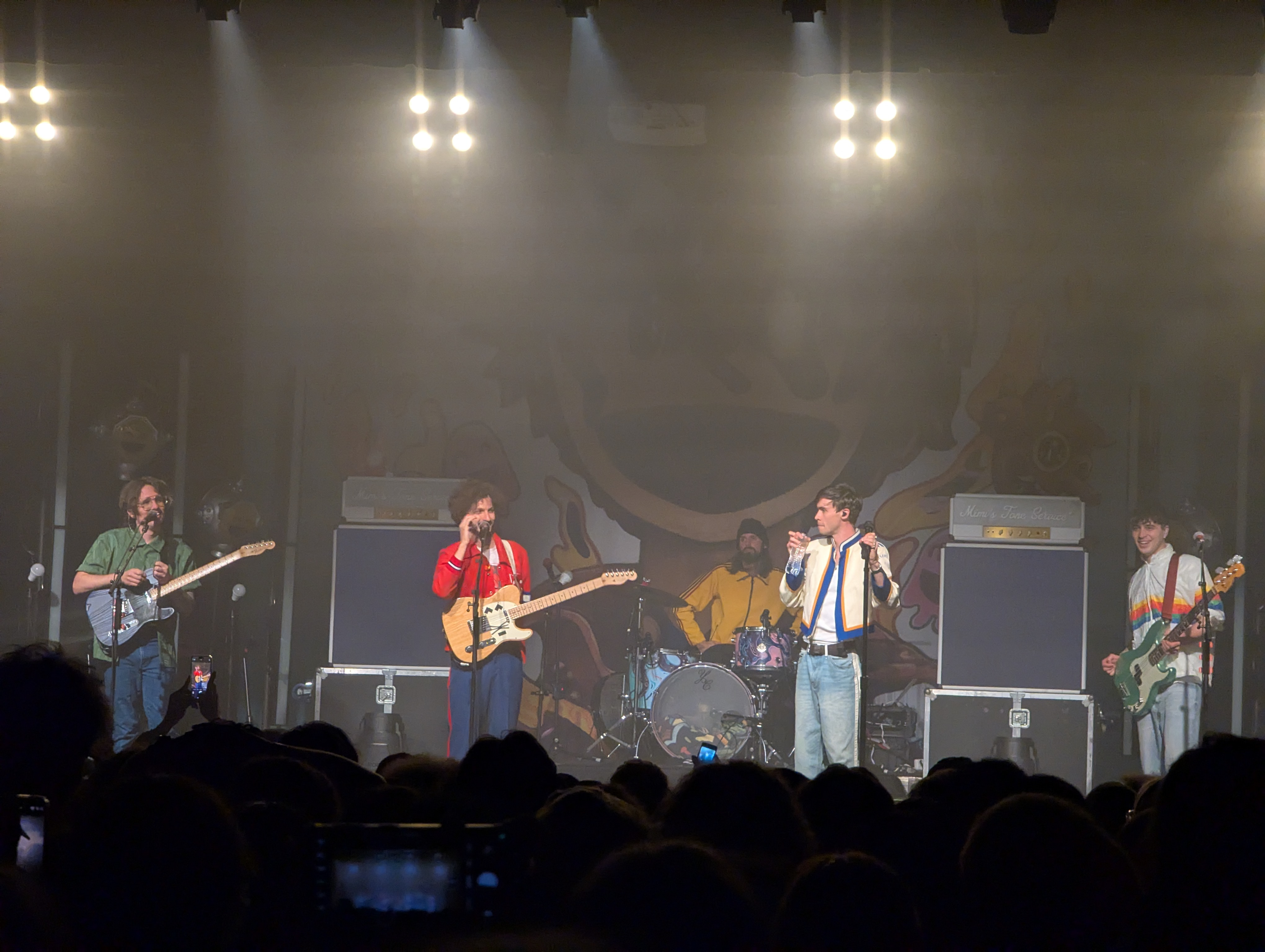
Good Kid between sets while performing at Bogart's in Cincinnati during their Chaos Kid tour in 2025

In 2023, the band performed a sold-out tour across the UK and Europe alongside Lovejoy. On June 20, 2023, Portugal. The Man announced Good Kid as a special guest for their Canadian tour running from November 6 to 18.

In 2024, Good Kid was nominated for Breakthrough Group of the Year at the 2024 Juno Awards. On March 27, the band released Good Kid 4, releasing singles for the EP including "Summer", "Bubbly", "Break", and a cover of "From the Start" by Laufey. The cover of "From The Start" would go on to become their most popular song. In August, the band also played at Lollapalooza. Following Lollapalooza, the band went on another tour in the UK and Europe.

In 2025, the artwork for the band's EP Good Kid 4 by Gabriel Altrows was nominated at the 2025 Juno Awards for Album Artwork of the Year.

=== 2025–present: Can We Hang Out Sometime? ===
In 2025, Good Kid released singles "Wall" and "Rift" before announcing their debut album, Can We Hang Out Sometime?, which would incorporate these two songs. The album was given a release date of April 3, 2026, followed by a subsequent tour of North America and Europe. On December 6, 2025, Good Kid performed at The Streamer Awards. In 2026, the singles "Eastside" and "Cicada" were released ahead of the full album. A profile by Dork on the release date of the album described them at that point as being "not far off" from the largest indie band in the world. Good Kid followed the album with a tour across Canada, the United States, the United Kingdom, and Europe.

== Influences and style ==
The band has taken influence from Bloc Party, Two Door Cinema Club, Gorillaz, and Twenty One Pilots. Michael Kozakov stated in an interview that the band pairs their indie rock with influences from other rock genres, namely punk rock, Australian aboriginal music, and J-rock. He also described the band as "incredibly open to anything new". The band has also taken influence from video games, internet culture, geek culture, anime, and manga as sources of inspiration for their songs.

Ben Rayner of the Toronto Star has described the band's music as "hyperactive, Tokyo Police Club-esque power pop." Individual songs have also been compared to the work of Panic! at the Disco and The Strokes. Frosst's vocals have been compared to that of Kele Okereke.

The band's music contains elements of storytelling and has developed a complex lore with a large set of characters. This originated from the artwork created by Gabriel Altrows to accompany the band's music. The lore they have created is based around a group of friends who deliver pizzas as a day job and play music at night in the city of Neo-TO, described as a utopian version of Toronto which highly values friendship and art. Rayner also noted that the band de-emphasizes personal stories in their work, though Tsafatinos has stated that the song "Mimi's Delivery Service" was inspired by his girlfriend. (Note: This is despite similarities in theme and name to Kiki's Delivery Service.)

== Personal lives ==
All members of the band are employed as programmers outside of the band, continuing work remotely while on tour. Frosst is a co-founder of Cohere, an artificial intelligence company oriented towards businesses which also employs Kozakov. In July 2024, Tsafatinos was a software engineer for Uber, though he had resigned by April 2026.

== Members ==
- Nick Frosst – lead vocals
- Jonathon Kereliuk – drums
- Michael Kozakov – bass
- David Wood – guitar
- Jacob Tsafatinos – guitar

== Discography ==
=== Albums ===
Title	Details	Peak chart positions
Title	Details	AUS
Can We Hang Out Sometime?	Released: April 3, 2026; Formats: Digital download, streaming, CD, vinyl	77

=== Soundtracks ===
Soundtracks
Title	Details
Ghost King's Revenge (OST)	Released: December 11, 2020; Formats: Digital download, streaming

=== EPs ===
List of extended plays, with release date shown
Title	Details	Peak chart positions
Title	Details	UK Indie
Good Kid	Released: June 15, 2018; Formats: Digital download, streaming, CD, vinyl, cassette	—
Good Kid 2	Released: November 6, 2020; Formats: Digital download, streaming, CD, vinyl, cassette	—
Good Kid 3	Released: April 14, 2023; Formats: Digital download, streaming, CD, vinyl, cassette	—
Good Kid 4	Released: March 27, 2024; Formats: Digital download, streaming, CD, vinyl, cassette	39
Acoustic Kid	Released: September 27, 2024 (Note: Originally released exclusively as B side to the vinyl release of Good Kid 4); Formats: Digital download, streaming, vinyl	—

=== Singles ===
List of singles, showing year released
Title	Year	Album	Ref.
"Nomu"	2015	Good Kid	
"Atlas"	2016	Good Kid	
"Witches"	2017	Good Kid	
"Tell Me You Know"	2018	Good Kid	
"Slingshot"	2019	Good Kid 2	
"Everything Everything"	2020	Good Kid 2	
"Drifting"	2020	Good Kid 2	
"Down With the King"	2020	Good Kid 2	
"Orbit"	2021	Good Kid 3	
"No Time To Explain"	2022	Good Kid 3	
"First Rate Town"	2023	Good Kid 3	
"Mimi's Delivery Service"	2023	Good Kid 3	
"Ground" (Note: Originally vinyl exclusive hidden track for Good Kid 3, later released as a standalone single on online platforms)	2023	Good Kid 3	
"Bubbly"	2024	Good Kid 4	
"Break"	2024	Good Kid 4	
"Summer"	2024	Good Kid 4	
"Wall"	2025	Can We Hang Out Sometime?	
"Rift"	2025	Can We Hang Out Sometime?	
"Eastside"	2026	Can We Hang Out Sometime?	
"Cicada"	2026	Can We Hang Out Sometime?	

=== Covers ===
List of covers, showing year released
Title	Year	Original From	Ref.
"From the Start"	2023	Laufey	
"I'm Like a Bird"	2025	Nelly Furtado	

== Tours ==
Headlining

- Speedrun USA Tour (2022)
- Good Kid Goes West (2022)
- The Return of Good Kid (2023)
- This Can't Be The End Tour (2024)
- Chaos Kid Tour (2025)
- Can We Hang Out Tour (2026)

== Awards and nominations ==
Year	Award	Category	Work	Result	Ref.
2024	Juno Awards	Breakthrough Group of the Year	—N/a	Nominated	
2025	Juno Awards	Album Artwork of the Year	Good Kid 4	Nominated	
