= Summer (Good Kid song) =

Single by Good Kid

from the EP Good Kid 4
- Released: March 8, 2024
- Genre: Indie rock
- Length: 2:27
- Songwriter: Good Kid
- Producer: Crispin Day

Good Kid singles chronology
"Break" (2024)	"Summer" (2024)	"Wall" (2025)

Music video
- "Summer" on YouTube

"Summer" is a song by the Canadian indie rock band Good Kid. It was released as a single from their fourth EP, Good Kid 4 (2024). Written by Good Kid and produced by Crispin Day, the song was released on March 8, 2024, on all platforms.

The song is characterized by its energetic indie rock and J-rock instrumentation, paired with emotionally reflective and nostalgic lyrics. It reached position 26 on the Canadian Modern Rock chart and has since become one of Good Kid's most successful tracks.

== Background ==
In 2024, Good Kid was nominated for Breakthrough Group of the Year at the 2024 Juno Awards. The band had already announced Good Kid 4, their fourth EP release, and had already released other singles slated for the EP prior to the release of "Summer". These included "Bubbly", "Break", and a cover of "From the Start", a song originally recorded by Laufey.

According to lead singer Nick Frosst, the song is about "...spending the winter months locked indoors and then finally taking a few steps outdoors to find that it’s 30 degrees and sunny." Guitarist David Wood explained in an interview that "we wrote a song about the Summer we never wanted to end."

== Composition ==
"Summer" is an exuberant indie rock song, with elements of J-rock, pop-punk, and indie punk. According to songbpm.com, the song is written in the key of F sharp or G flat major (Note: According to songdata.io, the track is written in F# minor.) and is set at a tempo of 90 beats per minute. The instrumentation of "Summer" is characterized by dual electric guitars, a highly active bassline and a background drumline presence.

== Release ==
"Summer" was first released on March 7, 2024. The single was accompanied by cover art designed by Gabriel Altrows, who has worked with Good Kid on several other projects. The single would then be released as part of the Good Kid 4 EP on March 27.

On October 27, 2024, an early cassette demo version of the song was released to the band's YouTube channel. This version was also found on a limited edition cassette tape for the Good Kid 4 extended play release, along with demo versions of other songs from the EP.

== Reception ==
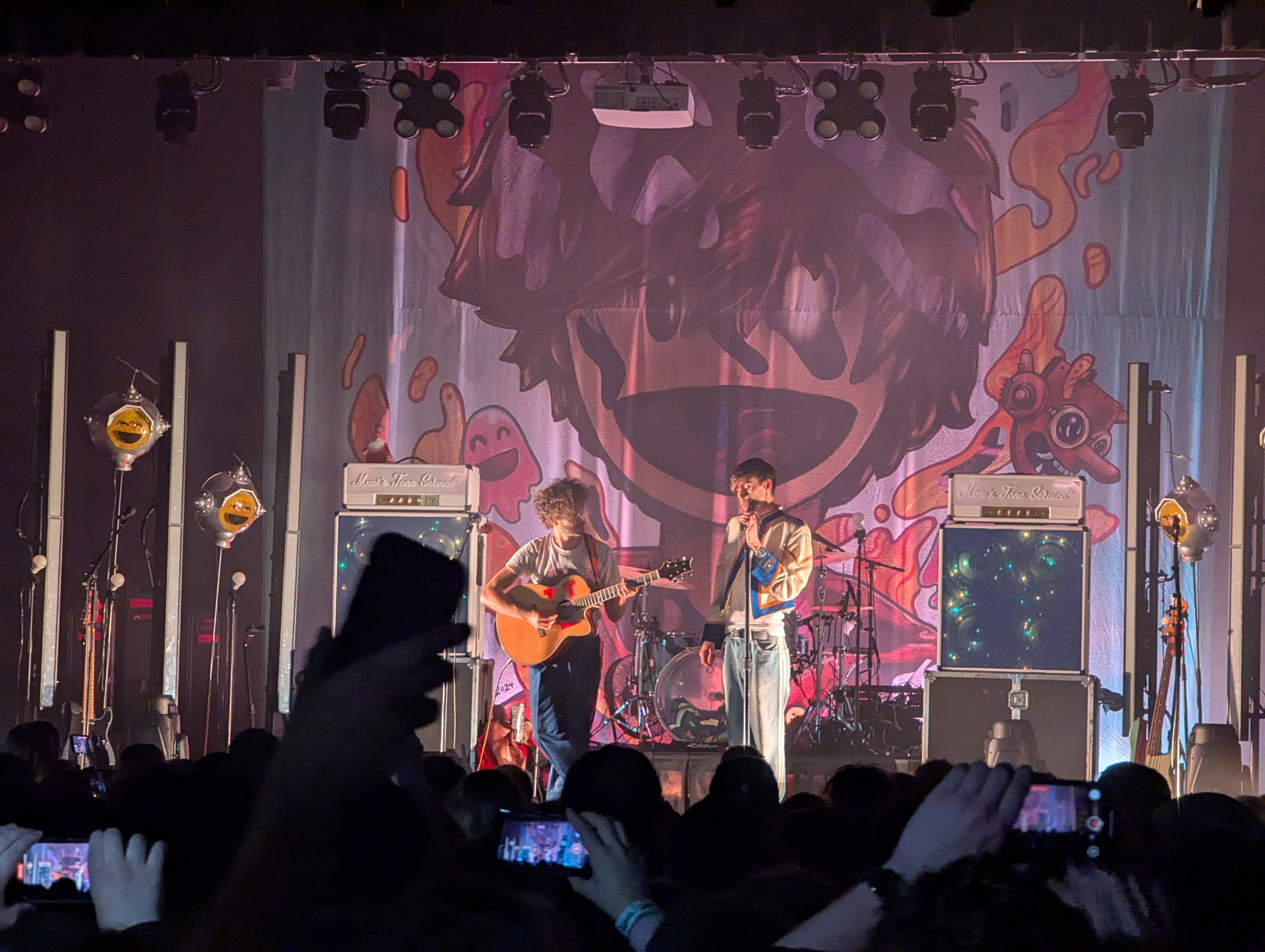
Good Kid on tour in 2025

The song has been described as "high energy and somewhat danceable." Sêan Reid noted that the song was "highlighted by vocalist Nick Frosst’s delicious wordplay and equally gorgeous guitar melodies" and described it as "[an] antidote to brighter days." An article by the Amplify Music Magazine acknowledged "singer Nick Frosst’s clever lyrics and catchy hooks taking center stage on this irresistible indie-pop hit".

After the release of "Summer" and the Good Kid 4 EP, the band announced a corresponding tour, dubbed the "This Can't Be The End Tour", which references a recurring lyric in "Summer". The tour included 21 shows in cities across Canada and the United States, with the band describing it as their "BIGGEST headlining tour" to date.

Later that year, a European leg of the tour was announced, with 13 shows across the United Kingdom and other Western European countries, which ran through September and October.

== Music video ==
Good Kid released an animated music video for "Summer" to their YouTube channel on March 7, 2024. The video was created by the independent animator XrayAlphaCharlie. It features the band's mascot, "Nomu Kid", trying to make a clay version of himself. According to a TikTok video released by the band, the music video "...tells the story of 'Nomu', a boy who wakes up from a dream with a premonition that he will one day break apart into pieces, so he plans to sculpt a new version of himself."

As of October 2026, the video has over 17 million views on YouTube.

== Charts ==
Chart (2024)	Peak position
Canada (Modern Rock)	26

== Personnel ==
=== Good Kid ===
- Nick Frosst – vocals
- Jacob Tsafatinos – electric guitar
- Michael Kozakov – bass
- Jonathon Kereliuk – drums
- David Wood – electric guitar

=== Production and engineering ===
- Crispin Day – producer
