= Wall (Good Kid song) =

Single by Good Kid

from the album Can We Hang Out Sometime?
- Released: October 10, 2025
- Genre: Indie rock
- Length: 2:51
- Songwriter: Good Kid
- Producer: John Congleton

Good Kid singles chronology
"Summer" (2024)	"Wall" (2025)	"Rift" (2025)

Music video
- "Wall" on YouTube

"Wall" is a song by the Canadian indie rock band Good Kid. It was released as a single on October 10, 2025. Written by Good Kid and produced by John Congleton, the song was later added to their debut album Can We Hang Out Sometime?, which was released in April 2026.

The song includes a high-energy, fast-paced indie rock and J-rock style, with lyrics that depict an awkward, unexpected run-in with an ex-partner at a vintage clothing store.

== Background ==
After the release of Good Kid's fourth extended play Good Kid 4 in March 2024, the band went over a year without releasing any new music. They spent over four months working on the song, although a similar demo track had been performed by the band on their 2024 tour, after which fans encouraged them to take the song to studio.

According to the band, "Wall" is about "running into your ex... it's about putting up walls, pretending you're fine, even though a single encounter at a vintage clothing shop can stir up everything you thought you left behind." Good Kid also mentioned that the song was "the most uninhibited and unfiltered we've ever been" with their music.

The final version of the song was recorded in Los Angeles with producer John Congleton. Guitarist David Wood mentioned that since it was Good Kid's first time working with Congleton, they "recorded ... in a way [they] hadn't before" and that the sound and production style was somewhat different from their previous music. However, since they had been working with the song for over a year, the production process was a lot easier.

== Composition ==
Like many of Good Kid's songs, "Wall" includes elements of indie rock, J-rock, and pop-punk. Guitarist Jacob Tsafatinos said he was inspired by Korean rock as well as some of his favorite anime opening songs. According to songbpm.com, the song is written in F sharp/G flat major, and has a tempo of 170 beats per minute.

== Release ==
"Wall" was released as a single on October 10, 2025. The release was accompanied by cover artwork designed by Gabriel Altrows, who has worked with Good Kid on previous projects.

In December 2025, the band announced their debut album, Can We Hang Out Sometime?, would be released in April 2026. The album would include "Wall", as well as the single "Rift" released the same month.

== Reception ==
"Wall" received general praise for its lyrics and instrumentation. Andrea Surmit of When in Manila praised the song for its "grittier, rawer, and unapologetically chaotic" energy. Kyle Forbush, reporting for the American music magazine SLUG, noted "the vocal maturity of lead singer Nick Frosst shows growth and a seriousness that suits the half-somber, half-accepting lyrics." In her review of Can We Hang Out Sometime?, Eliana Fermi wrote that "the excellent fuzz bass sound conveys a sense of attack, while Frosst's upper-register sustained notes in the chorus hit with emotional precision", and noted that the structure of the song "mirrors the emotional turbulence of the lyrics."

Good Kid played the song at concerts during their 2026 Can We Hang Out? tour.

== Music video ==
An animated music video for the song was released on Good Kid's official YouTube account the day of its release. The video was created by the independent animator XrayAlphaCharlie, who has previously created animated Good Kid music videos. The project received funding from the Government of Ontario, as well as FACTOR, a Canadian nonprofit.

== Personnel ==
=== Good Kid ===
- Nick Frosst – vocals
- Jacob Tsafatinos – electric guitar
- Michael Kozakov – bass
- Jonathon Kereliuk – drums
- David Wood – electric guitar

=== Production and engineering ===
- John Congleton – producer, mixing engineer
- Dan Weston – mastering engineer
