= Nick Frost (disambiguation) =

Nick Frost (born 1972) is a British actor, comedian and writer.

Nick Frost may also refer to:

- Nick Ffrost (born 1986), Australian swimmer
- Nick Frost (rugby union) (born 1999), Australian rugby union player
- Nick Frosst (born 1993), Canadian computer scientist and musician
