= Joëlle Pineau =

Canadian computer scientist (born 1974)

Joëlle Pineau FRSC
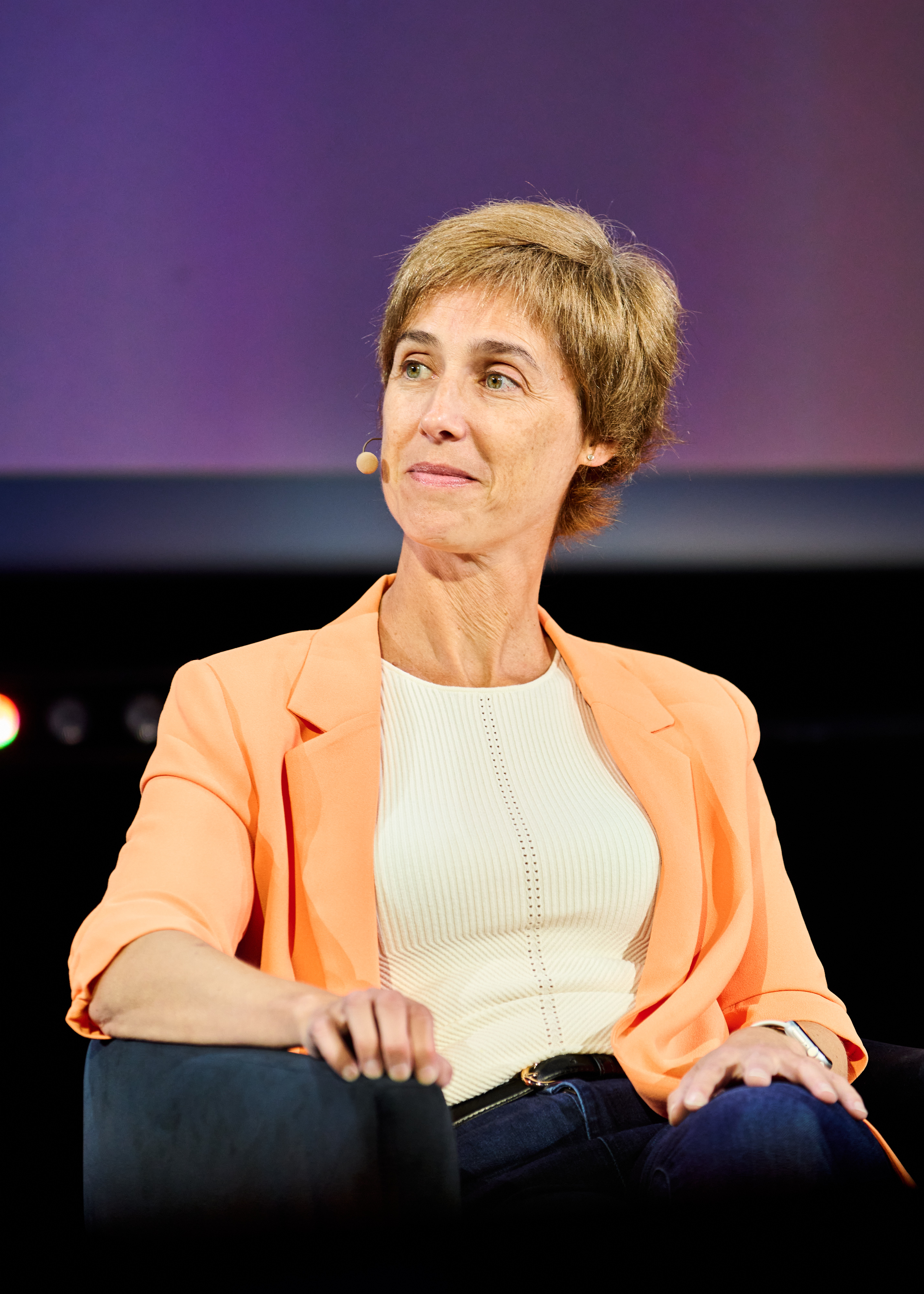
- Pineau in 2025
- Born: 1974 (age 51–52); Ottawa, Ontario, Canada
- Education: Carnegie Mellon University; University of Waterloo
- Children: 4
- Awards: AAAI Fellow (2018); Governor General's Innovation Award (2019); Fellow of the Royal Society of Canada (2023)
- Scientific career
- Workplaces: Cohere; Meta; McGill University; Mila Quebec
- Thesis: Tractable Planning Under Uncertainty: Exploiting Structure (2004)
- Academic advisors: Sebastian Thrun; Geoffrey J. Gordon
- Website: ai.meta.com/people/joelle-pineau/; cs.mcgill.ca/~jpineau/

Joëlle Pineau (born 1974) is a Canadian computer scientist and Professor at McGill University. She is the chief A.I. Officer of Cohere. She was the global vice president of Facebook Artificial Intelligence Research (FAIR), now known as AI at Meta, until May 2025. She was elected as a Fellow of the Royal Society of Canada in 2023.

== Early life and education ==
Pineau was born in 1974 in Ottawa, Ontario. She played the viola in the Ottawa Symphony Orchestra. She eventually studied engineering at the University of Waterloo. During that time, she helped train a voice recognition system for helicopter pilots; when no female pilots were available, Pineau sat in the cockpit to record voices for the system, simulating typical pilot stress levels. Her first job was at Canada's Ministry of Natural Resources, where she developed models focused on solar energy applications in aquaculture. She then completed her postgraduate education in robotics at Carnegie Mellon University in 2004. A chapter of Pineau's Masters thesis, Point-based value iteration: An anytime algorithm for POMDPs, has been published and cited almost 1,000 times. Her doctoral thesis, Tractable Planning Under Uncertainty: Exploiting Structure, was supervised by Sebastian Thrun and Geoff Gordon.

== Research and career ==
Pineau develops algorithms and models that allow learning in partially complex domains. She is co-director of McGill University's Reasoning and Learning Lab. She co-founded two initiatives that developed robotic assistants for the elderly; the SmartWheeler initiative and the Nursebot platform. SmartWheeler is a multi-modal wheelchair that combines artificial intelligence and robotics.

She is a Fellow of the Association for the Advancement of Artificial Intelligence (AAAI) and a Senior Fellow of the Canadian Institute for Advanced Research. In 2016 she was inducted into the Royal Society of Canada College of New Scholars, Artists and Scientists. Pineau and colleagues investigated approaches to personal medicine, using data from medical charts, X-ray images, clinical notes and lab reports to generate new treatment strategies. She developed AI techniques to allow Artificial intelligence analyse medical scans. Her team have used Deep learning for detecting seizures. She served as an editor of the Journal of Artificial Intelligence Research (JAIR) and the Journal of Machine Learning Research (JMLR). She has given lectures for the Artificial Intelligence Channel. She is a core academic member of Mila Quebec.

=== FAIR ===
In 2017 Pineau was appointed the head of the Facebook AI Research Lab in Montreal. She spoke at the third annual Canada 2020 conference. During her time at FAIR, she focused on research projects across all areas of AI, including deep learning, reinforcement learning, computer vision, natural language, and robotics. She has challenged Artificial intelligence research that is not reproducible. She was the reproducibility chair for the Conference on Neural Information Processing Systems in 2019, where she introduced the requirement of a reproducibility checklist as part of the paper submission process. She is a past president and emeritus member of the International Machine Learning Society. She climbed the ranks within FAIR and eventually led the entire Fundamental AI research organization at Meta.

Pineau was elected to the Fellow of the Royal Society of Canada in 2023 for her "contributions to research in machine learning, with a focus on Bayesian learning and planning under uncertainty." She is on the board of Partnership on AI.

Pineau left Meta's FAIR group in May 2025, stating that she wanted to refocus her energy before pursuing a new opportunity. In June 2025 she joined the board of Laude Institute.

=== Cohere ===
In August 2025 Pineau joined Cohere as chief AI officer. She is expanding the company's North platform and its enterprise agents; her focus is on privacy, security, and the ethical deployment of AI.

== Awards ==
She won a Facebook Research Award in 2017. In 2018 she won the Natural Sciences and Engineering Research Council E.W.R. Steacie Memorial Fellowship. In 2019, Pineau received a Governor General's Innovation Award for her leadership in the innovative applications of artificial intelligence and machine learning to the field of personalized medicine. In 2025 she was recognized on Observer Magazine's AI Power Index.

== Personal life ==
Pineau has four children and lives in Montreal, Canada.
