= Sara Hooker =

Irish computer scientist

- Scientific career
- Fields: Computer Science
- Workplaces: Adaption; Google; Cohere; Udemy

Sara Hooker is a computer scientist who works in artificial intelligence (AI). She has worked for companies including Google Brain and Cohere.

== Career ==
Hooker grew up in Africa. She became a researcher at Google Brain, and established Google's research lab in Ghana, the first of its kind in Africa. She became the head of Cohere for AI, a non-profit group affiliated with the for-profit AI company Cohere. In 2023, Hooker worked on a large language model that could use 10 languages. In 2025, she and Sudip Roy created a startup, Adaption Labs. In 2023, Hooker named one of AI's top 13 innovators by Fortune. In 2024, Time named her one of the most influential people in AI.
