= Cicada (Good Kid song) =

Single by Good Kid

from the album Can We Hang Out Sometime?
- Released: March 13, 2026
- Genre: Indie rock
- Length: 2:47
- Songwriter: Good Kid
- Producer: John Congleton

Good Kid singles chronology
"Eastside" (2026)	"Cicada" (2026)

Music video
- "Cicada" on YouTube

"Cicada" is a song by the Canadian indie rock band Good Kid. It was released as a single on March 13, 2026. Written by Good Kid and produced by John Congleton, the song was the final single release for their debut album Can We Hang Out Sometime?, which was released in April 2026.

== Background ==
"Cicada" explores themes of connection, anxiety, miscommunication, and acknowledging the difficulties of life, reflecting on "moments of personal stagnation and the people who help pull you out of them." The inspiration for the song's lyrics came from the band's members reflecting on past mistakes and relationship failures. According to guitarist Jacob Tsafatinos, the song is "rooted in times in our lives when we didn't feel like we were making good decisions." Guitarist David Wood said that "Cicada" was reflective of a former relationship which ended because of his overambition relating to his musical career, saying the song is about "being able to be a better person so you can move on from that." On reflecting on a previous relationship that inspired his lyrics for the song, Wood said "the very first relationship I had ... ended because I was verbally very ambitious, ... but I never showed the drive or effort to achieve it."

== Composition ==
Similar to many of the songs on the Can We Hang Out Sometime? album, "Cicada" includes elements of pop-punk, J-rock, and math rock. Lyrically, it contains themes of romance, introspection, personal growth, self-worth, and inadequacy. According to songbpm.com, the song is written in the key C and has a tempo of 178 beats per minute.

== Release ==
"Cicada" was released on March 13, 2026. The single's cover art was designed by independent artist Gabriel Altrows, who is a friend of the Good Kid members and has designed previous art for the band. This was the fourth and final single released by the band prior to the release of their first album, Can We Hang Out Sometime?, which was released on April 3, 2026. The song would be played at concerts during the Can We Hang Out? Tour.

== Reception ==
Critical reception of "Cicada" has generally been very positive, labelling the song as a "standout" and praising its lyrics and melodic character. Spin Magazine described the song as a "natural evolution of [Good Kid's] core sound" as an upbeat track that was "rooted in feelings of longing and inadequacy." The music magazine Rock N Load noted how "Cicada" fits the album's emotional range and lyrical themes, describing the song as "wrestling with inadequacy and desire", reflecting the "tension between closeness and distance" felt throughout the album. Schuyler Aldridge, in her review for Scene Music Media, said that the song "takes the album to another level", noting that the lyrics invoke themes of self-improvement, desperation, and hopefulness. The song has also been described as melancholic.

"Cicada" became the most popular song off the album, generating 5 million streams in less than a month.

== Music video ==
An animated music video for "Cicada" was released to Good Kid's official YouTube account on March 20, one week after the song's release. The video was created by the independent animator XrayAlphaCharlie, who has previously created animated music videos for Good Kid songs. The band had hosted a fan contest to create a music video for the song, offering a $1000 CAD prize to the winner, part of the band's efforts to support fans and creators. The video quickly went viral, getting almost 2 million views within 5 days of the album's release. As of November 2026, the video has over 14 million views on YouTube.

== Personnel ==
=== Good Kid ===
- Nick Frosst – vocals
- Jacob Tsafatinos – electric guitar
- Michael Kozakov – bass
- Jonathon Kereliuk – drums
- David Wood – electric guitar

=== Production and engineering ===
- John Congleton – producer, mixing engineer
- Dan Weston – mastering engineer
