= Cicadettana texana =

Scientific classification
- Kingdom: Animalia
- Phylum: Arthropoda
- Clade: Pancrustacea
- Class: Insecta
- Order: Hemiptera
- Suborder: Auchenorrhyncha
- Family: Cicadidae
- Tribe: Cicadettini
- Genus: Cicadettana
- Species: C. texana

Binomial name
- Cicadettana texana (Davis, 1936)

Synonyms
- Melampsalta texana Davis, 1936

Species of true bug

Cicadettana texana is a species of cicada in the family Cicadidae. The species was formerly a member of the genus Cicadetta.
