= Geoffrey J. Gordon =

Geoff Gordon
- Awards: NSF Graduate Research Fellowship

Academic background
- Education: Cornell University (BA)
- Alma mater: Carnegie Mellon University (PhD)
- Thesis: Approximate Solutions to Markov Decision Processes (1999)
- Doctoral advisor: Tom M. Mitchell

Academic work
- Institutions: Carnegie Mellon University
- Doctoral students: Joelle Pineau; Byron Boots
- Website: https://www.cs.cmu.edu/~ggordon/

Geoffrey J. Gordon is a professor at the Machine Learning Department at Carnegie Mellon University in Pittsburgh and director of research at the Microsoft Montréal lab. He is known for his research in statistical relational learning (a subdiscipline of artificial intelligence and machine learning) and on anytime dynamic variants of the A* search algorithm. His research interests include multi-agent planning, reinforcement learning, decision-theoretic planning, statistical models of difficult data (e.g. maps, video, text), computational learning theory, and game theory.

Gordon received a B.A. in computer science from Cornell University in 1991, and a PhD at Carnegie Mellon in 1999.
