= Cicadettana camerona =

Scientific classification
- Kingdom: Animalia
- Phylum: Arthropoda
- Clade: Pancrustacea
- Class: Insecta
- Order: Hemiptera
- Suborder: Auchenorrhyncha
- Family: Cicadidae
- Tribe: Cicadettini
- Genus: Cicadettana
- Species: C. camerona

Binomial name
- Cicadettana camerona (Davis, 1920)

Species of true bug

Cicadettana camerona is a species of cicada in the family Cicadidae found in North America. The species was formerly a member of the genus Cicadetta.
