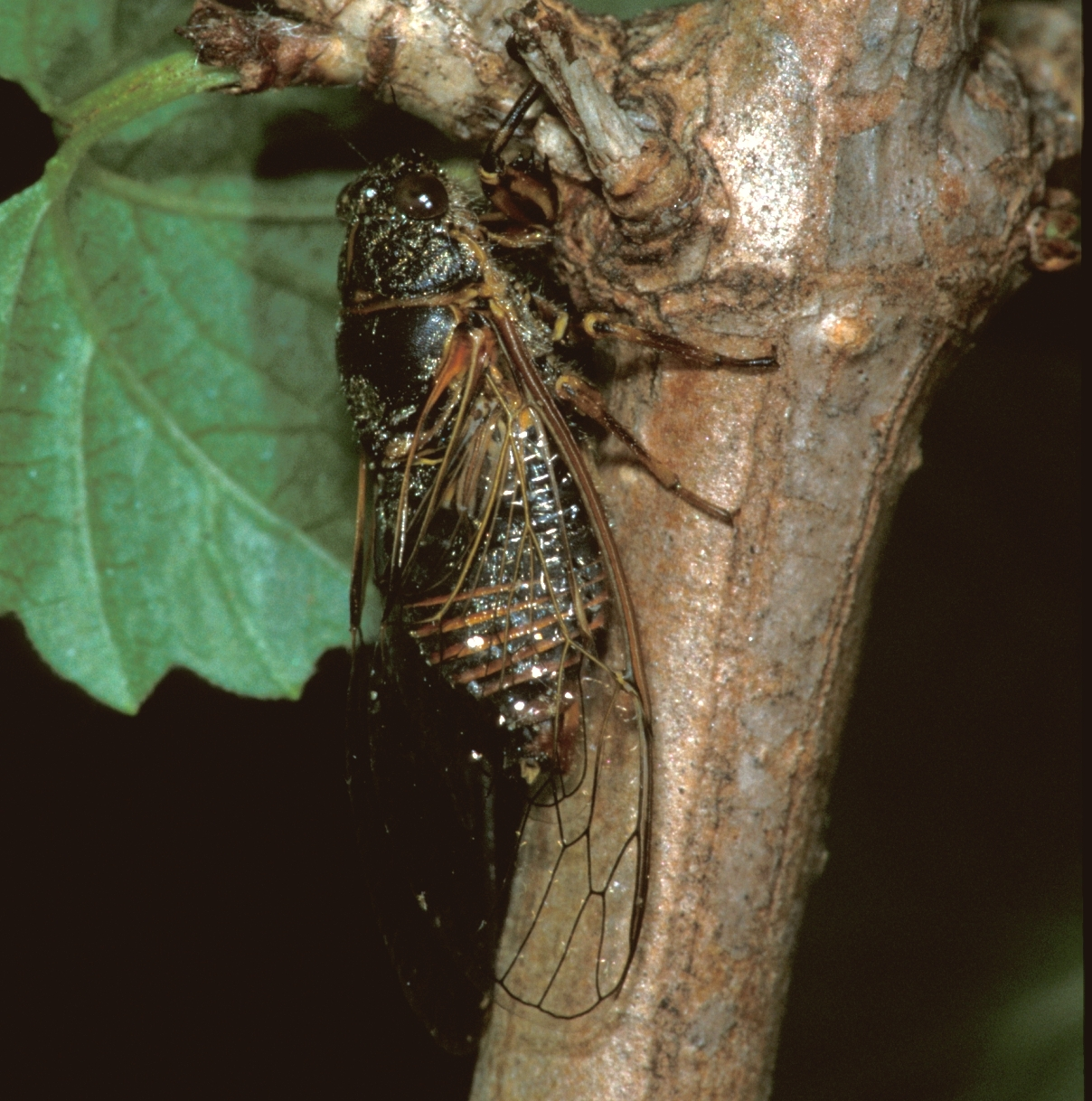

Scientific classification
- Kingdom: Animalia
- Phylum: Arthropoda
- Clade: Pancrustacea
- Class: Insecta
- Order: Hemiptera
- Suborder: Auchenorrhyncha
- Family: Cicadidae
- Genus: Cicadetta
- Species: C. cantilatrix

Binomial name
- Cicadetta cantilatrix Sueur & Puissant, 2007

= Cicadetta cantilatrix =

Species of true bug

Cicadetta cantilatrix is a cicada found in France, Poland, Germany, Switzerland, Austria, Slovenia, North Macedonia, and Montenegro. The calling song from this species consists of two phrases with different echemes.
