= Cicadettana kansa =

Scientific classification
- Kingdom: Animalia
- Phylum: Arthropoda
- Clade: Pancrustacea
- Class: Insecta
- Order: Hemiptera
- Suborder: Auchenorrhyncha
- Family: Cicadidae
- Genus: Cicadettana
- Species: C. kansa

Binomial name
- Cicadettana kansa (Davis, 1919)

Species of true bug

Cicadettana kansa is a species of cicada in the family Cicadidae, found in North America. The species was formerly a member of the genus Cicadetta.
