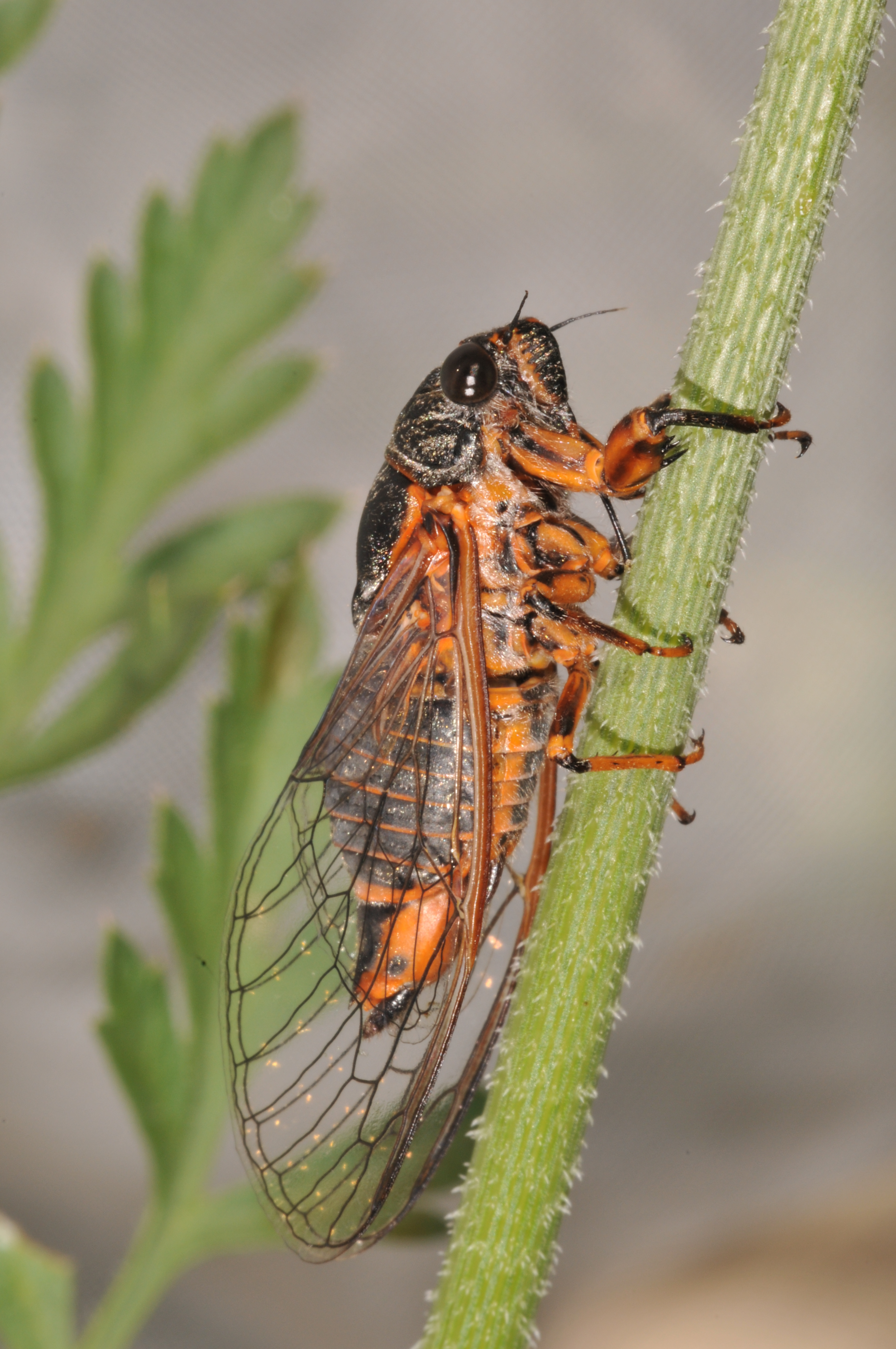

Scientific classification
- Kingdom: Animalia
- Phylum: Arthropoda
- Clade: Pancrustacea
- Class: Insecta
- Order: Hemiptera
- Suborder: Auchenorrhyncha
- Family: Cicadidae
- Subfamily: Cicadettinae
- Tribe: Cicadettini
- Genus: Cicadetta
- Species: C. montana

Binomial name
- Cicadetta montana (Scopoli, 1772)

= Cicadetta montana =

Species of true bug

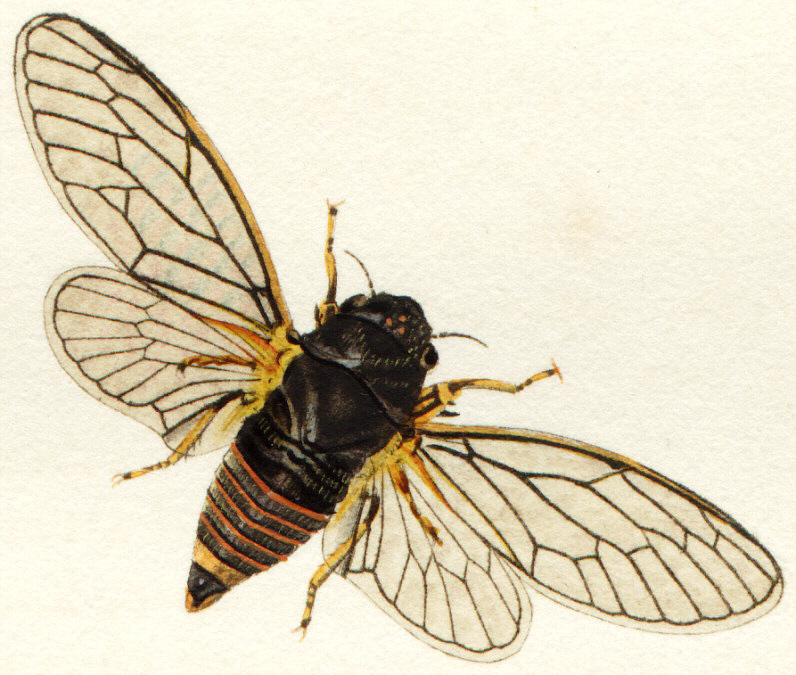
Cicadetta montana male, painted by John Curtis)

Cicadetta montana, commonly known as the New Forest Cicada, is a species of cicada found throughout Europe and in parts of Asia.

It is endangered over large parts of Europe, and has vanished from several areas in Western Europe. It is the only cicada species native to England and Finland (Åminnefors in Pohja).

The adult females inject their eggs into the stems of food plants, and, when the larvae emerge, they burrow underground and as nymphs feeding on root sap. This underground stage lasts for between four to ten years.

Females have a body measuring about 50 mm in length, with the males being much smaller. It has transparent wings with prominent veins, folded over the back when at rest, and a dark slate-grey or black body with dull orange rings around the abdomen. The legs are marked with dull orange as are the leading edges of the wings (costae).

As with all cicadas, the males produce the shrill, buzzing calls by rapidly flexing drum-like membranes, while the females are limited to producing clicks. The call of C montana sounds like static hiss to the unaided human ear and is sustained with relatively short lulls at irregular intervals.

== Food plants ==
- Betula pendula (silver birch)
- Betula pubescens (downy birch)
- Corylus avellana (common hazel)
- Crataegus monogyna (common hawthorn)
- Fagus sylvatica (European beech)
- Pteridium aquilinum (bracken)
- Quercus robur (pedunculate oak)
- Ulex europaeus (common gorse)

== Taxonomic history ==
In 1772, Scopoli described and named the type specimen from Slovenia as Melampsalta montana, and this was later changed to Cicadetta montana. It has turned out to be not a single taxon, but a complex of closely related species distinguishable by their songs. Using this method of differentiation, at least 10 species have been separated from the complex. Classification by calls has led to three main groups being proposed which largely correspond with the clades suggested by DNA analyses – one new species not fitting in the proposed scheme.

=== Synonyms ===
- Melampsalta montana Scopoli, 1772
- Cicadetta flavofenestrata Goeze, 1778
- C. schafferi Gmelin, 1780
- C. pygmaea Olivier, 1790
- C. dimidiata Fabricius, 1803
- C. anglica Samouelle, 1819
- C. parvula Walker, 1850
- C. saxonica Hartwig, 1857
- C. megerlei Fieber, 1876
- C. longipennis Fieber, 1876

== New Forest cicada project ==
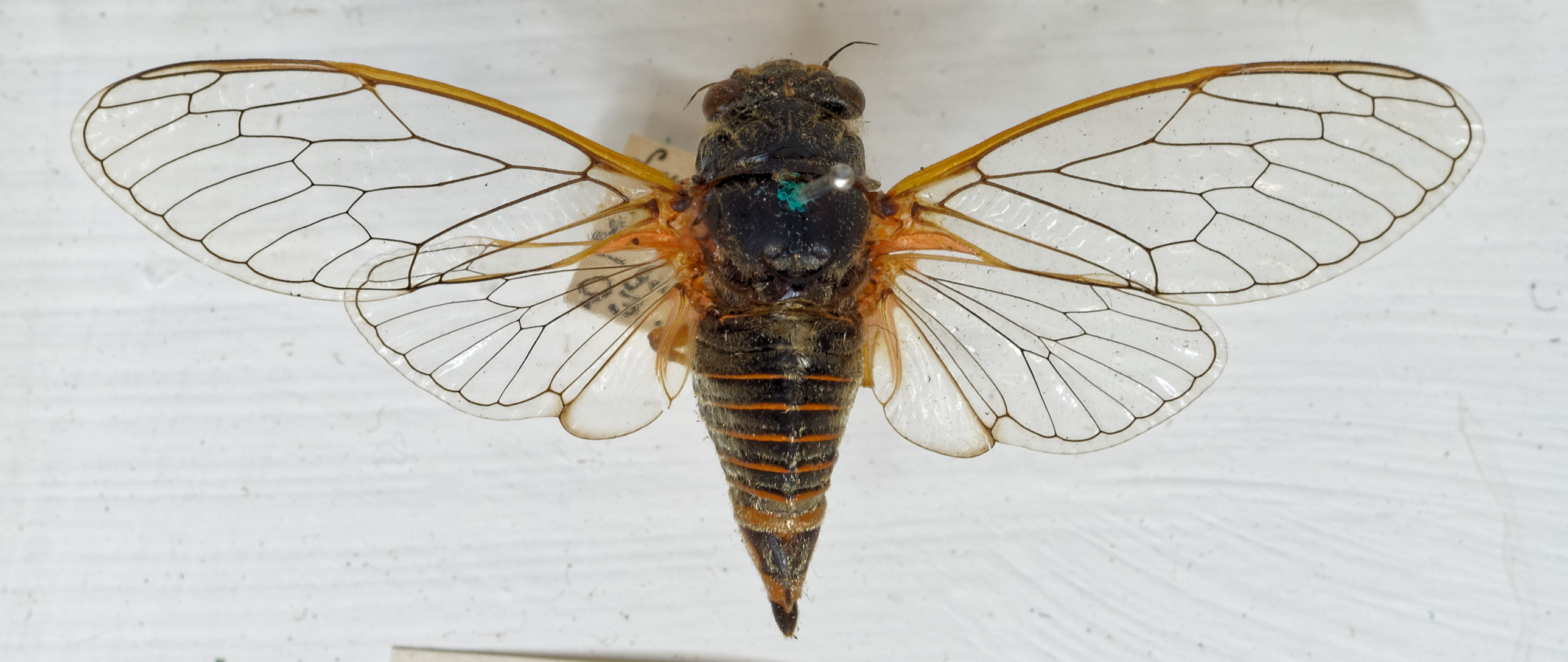
A specimen taken in the New Forest in June 1892

C. montana has not been seen or heard anywhere in Britain since 1996. In 2013, in an attempt to locate remaining specimens, developers have written application software for smartphones, enabling users to listen to sound frequencies beyond the normal human range. Up to December 2015, over 3,000 people had downloaded the "Hunt for the New Forest Cicada app" without success in Britain, although the app has recorded the insect in Slovenia. From 2016 onwards, 100 autonomous acoustic monitoring devices were to be deployed each year throughout the New Forest.

C. montana also disappeared between 1941 and 1961, so their current absence may be part of a cycle.

In 2024 a project to re-introduce the species to the New Forest was launched by the Species Recovery Trust. The project will involve capturing individuals from the Idrija region of Slovenia, with some to be captive bred and others released into a series of carefully monitored locations.

Another project commenced in 2026, collecting eggs from the French military base Académie militaire de Saint-Cyr Coëtquidan in Brittany.
