= Byron Boots =

American roboticist

- Education: Carnegie Mellon University
- Scientific career
- Fields: Machine Learning, Robotics
- Doctoral advisor: Geoffrey J. Gordon

Byron Boots is an American professor of machine learning at University of Washington (UW). He is the co-founder of the startup company Overland AI.
