= Cicadettana =

- Cicadettana calliope calliope

Scientific classification
- Kingdom: Animalia
- Phylum: Arthropoda
- Clade: Pancrustacea
- Class: Insecta
- Order: Hemiptera
- Suborder: Auchenorrhyncha
- Family: Cicadidae
- Subfamily: Cicadettinae
- Tribe: Cicadettini
- Genus: Cicadettana; Marshall and Hill, 2017

Genus of true bugs

Cicadettana is a genus of cicada belonging to the tribe Cicadettini of the family Cicadidae. Until 2017, the included species were classified under the genus Cicadetta. Cicadettana are small (12–20 mm body length), inconspicuous cicadas with high-pitched songs, and they are commonly found on grass or low shrubs. One species (ramosi) is known from Hispaniola, while the rest are found in the United States east of the Rocky Mountain divide. The type species of the genus is Cicadettana calliope calliope, originally designated as Cicada calliope Walker, 1850. Their closest known relatives are found in Europe, eastern Asia, and Micronesia.

== Species ==
- Cicadettana calliope
  - C. c. calliope (Walker, 1850) – east of Rocky Mountain divide, excluding northern/northeastern states
  - C. c. floridensis (Davis, 1920) – southeastern states
- Cicadettana camerona (Davis, 1920) – southern Texas (Cameron County)
- Cicadettana kansa (Davis, 1919) – central and southern Great Plains states
- Cicadettana ramosi (Sanborn, 2009) – Hispaniola
- Cicadettana texana (Davis, 1936) – south central Texas
