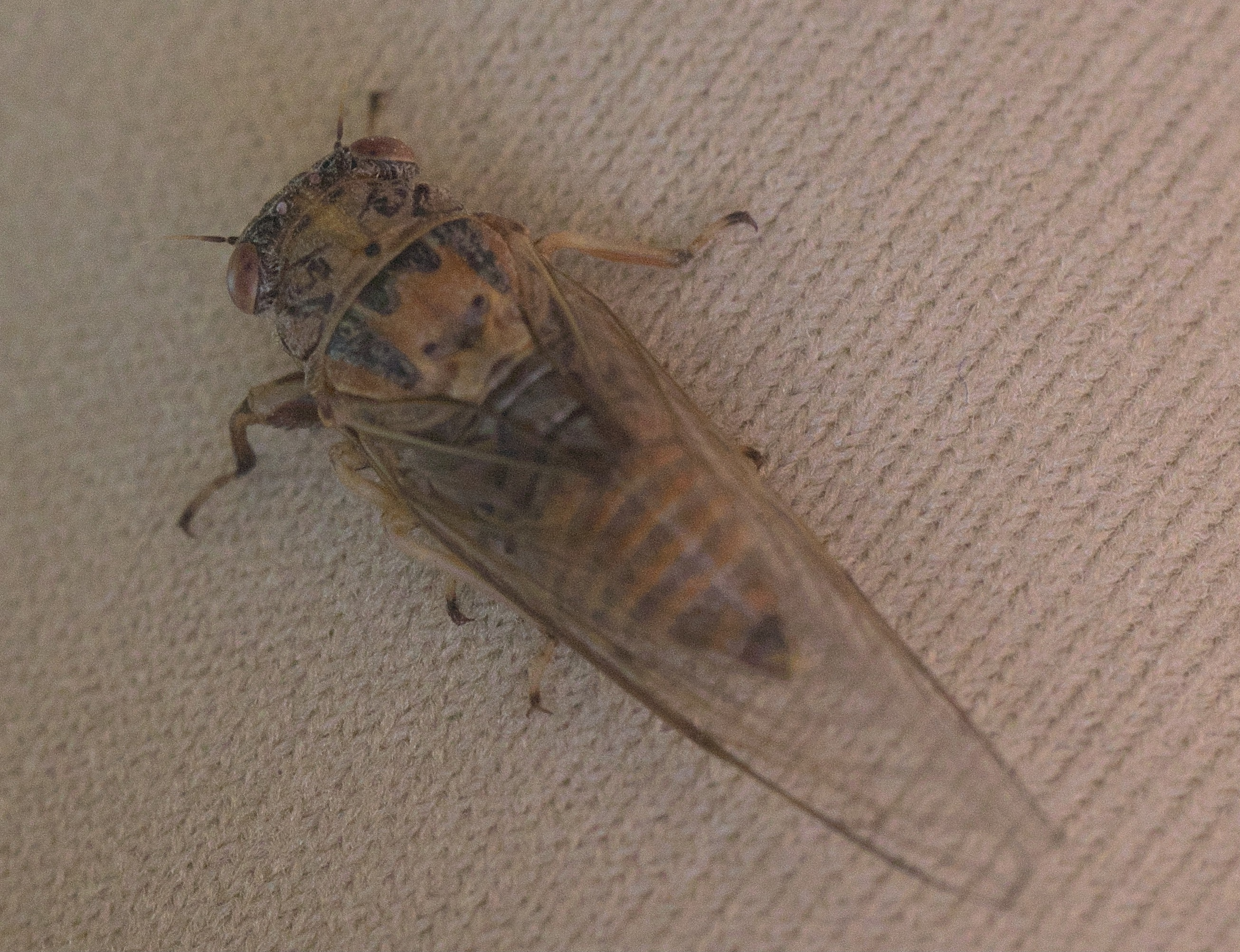
- Cicadettana calliope calliope, Oklahoma

Scientific classification
- Kingdom: Animalia
- Phylum: Arthropoda
- Clade: Pancrustacea
- Class: Insecta
- Order: Hemiptera
- Suborder: Auchenorrhyncha
- Family: Cicadidae
- Genus: Cicadettana
- Species: C. calliope

Binomial name
- Cicadettana calliope (Walker, 1850)

= Cicadettana calliope =

Species of true bug

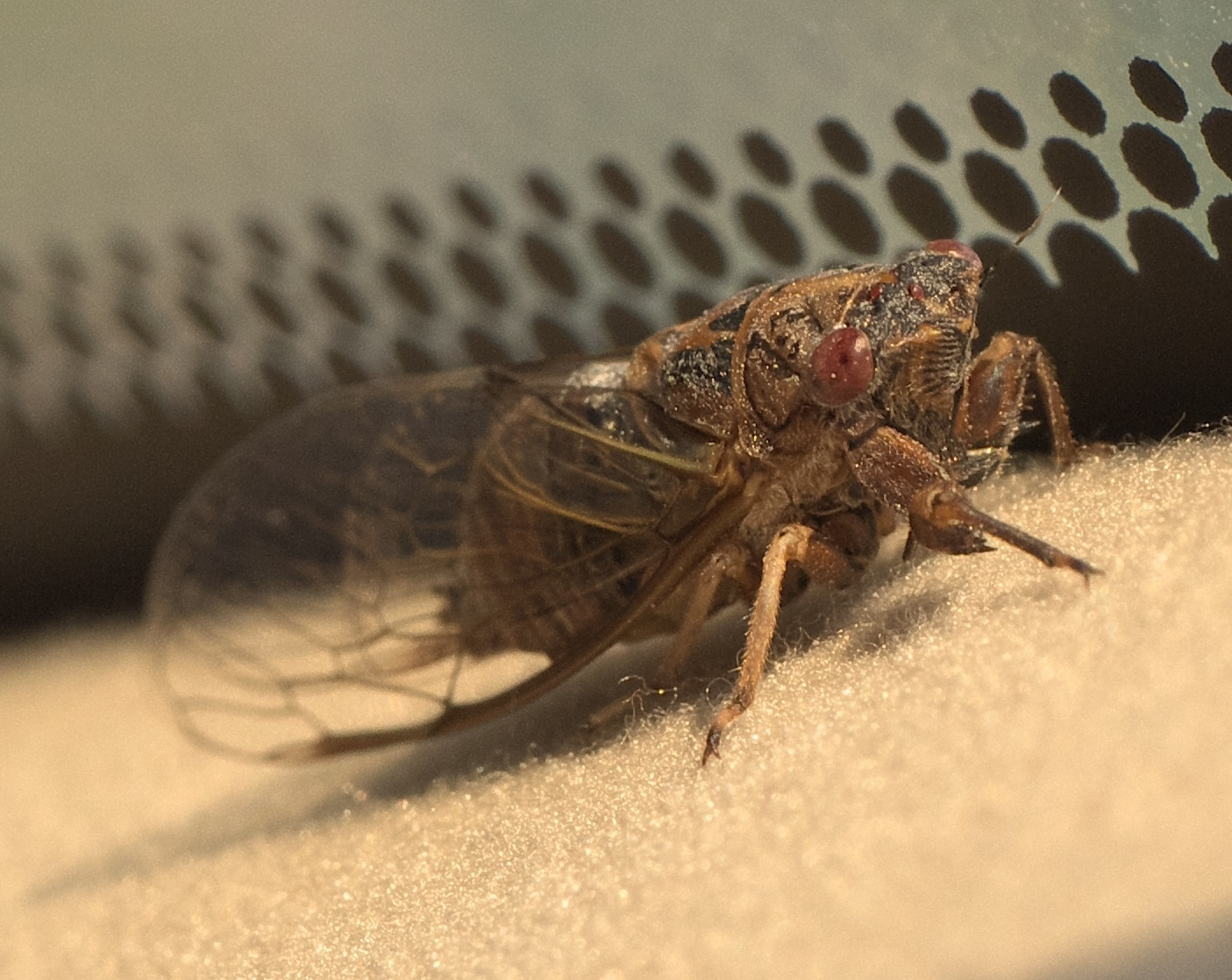
Cicadettana calliope calliope

Cicadettana calliope is a species of cicada in the family Cicadidae, found in North America. The species was formerly a member of the genus Cicadetta.

== Life Cycle ==
Their median total life cycle length is around four years, this being from egg to a natural adult death.

== Subspecies ==
These two subspecies belong to the species Cicadetta calliope:

- Cicadetta calliope calliope (Walker, 1850)
- Cicadetta calliope floridensis (Davis, 1920)
