= Cicada (Japanese band) =

Japanese trip-hop band

CICADA シケイダ
- Origin: Japan
- Genres: Trip-hop; pop
- Years active: 2012 – March 2019
- Labels: para de casa
- Past members: Ryosuke Hitsuda; Akiko Kido; Chokyo Kimura; Shunsuke Ochi; Sosuke Oikawa; Tomo Wakabayashi

Cicada (stylized as CICADA) was a Japanese trip-hop band formed in 2012 and disbanded in March 2019.

== History ==
Cicada formed in late 2012 when band member Tomo Wakabayashi began searching for members of a trip-hop band on the social networking site mixi. The name Cicada comes from the video game Front Mission, which features a mecha called Cicada.

Cicada performed at the Apple Music Festival in 2014.

The band's debut album BED ROOM was released on February 4, 2015 on record label para de casa. Their second album, Formula, was also released by para de casa on November 9, 2016. They later signed with Universal Music Japan.

Cicada broke up in March 2019. Oikawa started a new band called Roomies.

== Members ==
Cicada was initially composed of five members.

- Ryosuke Hitsuda (櫃田良輔), drums
- Akiko Kido (城戸あき子), vocals
- Chokyo Kimura (木村朝教), bass
- Sosuke Oikawa (及川創介), keyboard
- Tomo Wakabayashi (若林とも), guitar, keyboard, sampler

Shunsuke Ochi (越智俊介) joined the band in 2017 as bassist, replacing Kimura.

== Discography ==
=== Albums ===
- BED ROOM (2015)
- Formula (2016)
- ESCAPE (2018)

=== Mini albums ===
- Eclectic (2013)
- blue nude (2014)
- Loud Colors (2016)

=== Singles and EPs ===
- stand alone (2015)
- "Harvest" / "Party Out" (2017)
- "u got my love" (2019)
