= Can We Hang Out Sometime? =

Studio album by Good Kid
- Released: April 3, 2026
- Studio: Animal Rites
- Genre: Indie rock
- Length: 25:41
- Label: Good People
- Producer: John Congleton

Good Kid chronology
Good Kid 4 (2024)	Can We Hang Out Sometime? (2026)

Singles from Can We Hang Out Sometime?
- 1. "Wall" Released: October 10, 2025; 2. "Rift" Released: November 21, 2025; 3. "Eastside" Released: February 3, 2026; 4. "Cicada" Released: March 13, 2026

Can We Hang Out Sometime? is the debut studio album by the Canadian indie rock band Good Kid. It was released on April 3, 2026, through Good People Record Co. Supported by four singles, the album mainly explores themes of love, friendship, and loss. Recorded in Los Angeles with producer John Congleton during the 2025 LA wildfires, it was heavily influenced by those circumstances. The indie rock album was first announced in December 2025 and received generally positive reviews from critics, with many praising its atmosphere while criticizing its lack of originality.

Alongside the announcement of the album, a tour was also announced, which would go across North America and Europe. Commercially, the album peaked at number 77 on the Australian Albums Chart, number 14 on the UK Independent Albums Breakers Chart, and number 40 on the US Top Album Sales chart.

== Background ==
Good Kid described Can We Hang Out Sometime? as their most "unfiltered and uninhibited" release to date, stating that the album features irreproducible sounds and recording methods that made each take unique, and that the band made several creative risks during its production and accepted the outcome of such choices.

The band has stated that the album is based around a narrative of sustaining relationships in uncertain times, with themes including love, anger, friendship, and loss. The album additionally emphasizes forgiveness, letting go, hopeless romance, and resolving interpersonal conflict by attempting to spend time with friends.

The album was recorded in Los Angeles by John Congleton during the 2025 LA wildfires. The wildfires played a major role in getting the album finished. The band stated that Congleton helped shape the album by a giving the band a "brand new soundscape". The album's title came from a lyric by the band's guitarist David Wood, but Congleton helped shape it into the final name. The title's meaning is an invitation aimed at friends or people they "miss hanging out with." The album's artwork was created by Gabriel Altrows, with the band collaborating with Altrows remotely due to the wildfires, discussing each song's color, mood, and imagery.

== Composition ==
Can We Hang Out Sometime? was described by Dork as "classic indie guitar-pop", featuring lively and energetic guitar riffs and melodies combined with lyrics which alternate between enthusiasm and awkward sincerity. The album was described by Exclaim! as a "26-minute blast of bright 2000s indie rock hooks." The album features guitar-driven indie rock sound with tight rhythms and melodic hooks.

== Release and singles ==
"Wall" was released as the lead single from Can We Hang Out Sometime? on October 10, 2025, accompanied by an animated music video created by Winnipeg-based animator Xray Alpha Charlie, who was later invited by the band to collaborate on official visuals after producing fan animations using their music. "Rift" was released as the album's second single on November 21. On December 5, 2025, Can We Hang Out Sometime? was officially announced by Good Kid. A music video for "Rift", directed by Ted Nivison, was released on December 19. "Eastside" was released as the third single on February 3. "Cicada" was released on March 13. The album was released on April 3.

== Critical reception ==
Professional ratings
Review scores
Source	Rating
Dork	4/5 stars
No Ripcord	5/10
Spill Magazine	4.5/5 stars

Can We Hang Out Sometime? received positive reviews from critics, with many praising the sound and songwriting. Mercedes Chircop of Spill Magazine rated Can We Hang Out Sometime? a 9 out of 10, praising its sound, songwriting, and emotional range. Writing for Dork, Harry Shaw rated the album four stars, appreciating its energy, hooks, and charm. Writer Leo Edworthy from Earmilk stated that the album extends Good Kid's established musical style while maintaining its authenticity. The record features emotional lyrical themes and experimental production that incorporates imperfections. Edworthy also found a contrast between the album's raw production and the energy of the band's live performances. In an album release round up from No Ripcord, the review describes the album as a pleasing and satisfying indie rock album that successfully draws on sleek, propulsive guitar influences from bands like Two Door Cinema Club and Bloc Party, specifically highlighting the tracks "Cicada" and "Tornado." The band is also credited for putting genuine thought into the visual aspect of their project.

Can We Hang Out Sometime? also received criticism for its lack of originality. Chircop criticized the album's lack of major reinvention and reliance on familiar elements. Shaw pointed out its lack of originality and ambition. No Ripcord stated that the album lacks passionate urgency and relies on pastiche rather than a distinct musical identity.

== Tour ==
Alongside the announcement of the album, Good Kid announced an accompanying tour of the same name. The tour included dates for 2026 across North America, the United Kingdom, and Europe. The tour started the week after release on April 10 and is set to end on October 3. INOHA opened for the North American dates of the tour, excluding the London show.

== Track listing ==
All tracks are written by David Wood, Jacob Tsafatinos, Jonathon Kereliuk, Michael Kozakov, and Nicholas Frosst.

Can We Hang Out Sometime? track listing
No.	Title	Length
1.	"Rift"	3:02
2.	"Eastside"	1:37
3.	"Coffee"	2:12
4.	"Cicada"	2:46
5.	"Tea Leaves"	2:52
6.	"Alone with Me"	2:32
7.	"Ghost Keeper"	2:25
8.	"Tornado"	2:19
9.	"Wall"	2:51
10.	"Ginger Lemonade"	3:05
Total length:		25:41

== Personnel ==
Credits adapted from the album's liner notes and Tidal.

=== Good Kid ===
- Nicholas Frosst – lead vocals
- Jonathon Kereliuk – drums
- Michael Kozakov – bass
- Jacob Tsafatinos – electric guitar
- David Wood – electric guitar

=== Additional contributors ===
- John Congleton – production, mixing
- Pete Milkovic – additional engineering
- Mike Darolfi – additional engineering
- Dan Weston – mastering
- Gabriel Altrows – artwork, illustration, design
- Shutteye – additional insert layout
- Spicychashu – calendar illustration

== Charts ==
Weekly chart performance for Can We Hang Out Sometime?
Chart (2026)	Peak position
Australian Albums (ARIA)	77
UK Independent Albums Breakers (OCC)	14
US Top Album Sales (Billboard)	40
