= Aleph Alpha =

German artificial intelligence company

Aleph Alpha GmbH
- Type: Private
- Industry: Artificial intelligence
- Founded: 2019; 7 years ago
- Founders: Jonas Andrulis; Samuel Weinbach
- Headquarters: Heidelberg, Germany
- Products: Luminous LLM
- Number of employees: 51–200 (2024)
- Website: aleph-alpha.com

Aleph Alpha GmbH is a German artificial intelligence (AI) startup developing large language models (LLMs). It emphasizes transparency of the sources used to generate the results. The company caters to enterprises and governmental agencies only.

== History ==
Aleph Alpha was founded in 2019 by Jonas Andrulis and Samuel Weinbach. After securing €5.3 million in seed funding in 2020, Aleph Alpha raised an additional €23 million in a second round of financing in 2021, backed by several European venture capital firms. In 2021, Aleph Alpha offered multimodality, the ability to prompt their models with any combination of text and images. In 2022, the company developed the ability to create images based on multimodal input (NeurIPS 2023: Multifusion).

In a financing round in November 2023, German companies Schwarz Gruppe and Dieter Schwarz Foundation, with the Innovation Park Artificial Intelligence (IPAI), participated as the co-lead investors along with Bosch, SAP, Hubert Burda Media, Christ&Company Consulting, and Hewlett Packard Enterprise. The round raised a total of $500 million. The amount of a 500 million dollar financing round publicly communicated by Aleph Alpha appeared to be significantly higher than the funds actually raised. Research by the trade press subsequently revealed that only 110 million euros of the total volume was genuine equity financing. A further 300 million euros had flowed into research funding for the company subsidiary Aleph Alpha Research, as well as 60 million euros in the form of order commitments. Meanwhile, the internal sales target of 6 million US dollars for 2023 had not been achieved: According to the 2023 financial statements, the company had not even been able to show a turnover of one million euros, while the loss amounted to 18.9 million euros.

In April 2026, Cohere and Aleph Alpha announced that they are in talks to merge and have Berlin's support for a potential deal. On 24 April, Cohere and Aleph Alpha announced that a merger would go through in a deal which Cohere would acquire Aleph Alpha. Though the terms of the deal were not public, an anonymous individual told the New York Times that would make the combined companies worth $20 billion. The deal was made in a bid to challenge AI dominance from primarily the United States as well as China, with the New York Times noting that Cohere had struggled to keep up in attracting investment from US-based companies. Schwarz Gruppe stated the terms of the deal would also involve them investing $600 million in Cohere.

In September 2026, Cohere and Aleph Alpha signed a definitive merger agreement. The combined company will operate under the name Cohere, with headquarters in Berlin and Toronto. Aleph Alpha's Heidelberg location will be retained as a research center. The transaction remains subject to regulatory approvals.

In October 2026, Aleph Alpha released Kolibri, a large language model supporting German and English and based on a mixture of experts architecture. The model weights were made publicly available on Hugging Face under the Apache License 2.0. Kolibri is designed for language processing, text generation, reasoning, and agentic tasks.

== Description ==
Aleph Alpha developed its own AI language model, Luminous, based on its own research and codebase with the architecture of generative pre-trained transformers (GPT) and self-supervised learning. Its method makes patterns learned by GPT models visible and controllable, addressing the "black box" problem of generative AI. As a tool to build and train its foundation models, the HPE Machine Learning Development System is used.

Customers include the citizen information system, Lumi, for the city of Heidelberg.

For R&D, Aleph Alpha is working with the University of Duisburg-Essen and the Technical University of Darmstadt. It is also participating in open-source organizations such as EleutherAI. Both Hewlett Packard Enterprise (HPE) and SAP have entered non-exclusive partnerships with Aleph Alpha.

== See also ==
- General Data Protection Regulation
- AI alignment
