= Cicadas in mythology =

Cicada lore and mythology is rich and varied as there are about 2500 species of cicada throughout the world, many of which are undescribed and remain a mystery to science. Cicadas have been prized as a delicacy, and are famed throughout the world for their song.

The cicada is an animal replete with symbolism: recurring themes are resurrection, immortality, spiritual realization and spiritual ecstasy. For the Ancient Greeks and Romans they sang ecstatically, were sacred to Apollo and related to the dionysiac bacchae and maenads.

== Eunomos and his cithara ==
Egan (1994) cites several Greek sources that tell the story of Eunomos and the cicada. Eunomos, an accomplished cithara player and singer, was performing in a competition when one of the cithara strings snaps. A cicada as offering, alights on his cithara, sustaining the note of the broken string. Eunomos, thereby attributed accolade, wins the competition.

== Aristotle ==
Aristotle, fond of eating cicadas, described them briefly in his Historia Animalium. From this, we know that he was aware of their periodic lifecycle, their resurrection from the earth, their progression to winged form and their song. Aristotle is attributed with disseminating in Greek culture cicada symbolism of resurrection and immortality, although their liminal aspect and propensity to incite admiration pre-date Aristotle.

== Phaedrus, Plato and Socrates ==
In Phaedrus, a dialogue authored by Plato, the sage Socrates and his student of rhetoric Phaedrus engage in repartee in an idyllic setting on a riverbank in the shade of a tree occupied by a chorus of cicadas.

These cicadas are not simply decorative; they add a profound metaphor, transcendent musical motif and a liminal aspect to the dialogue of Socrates and Phaedrus.

It is in Phaedrus that Socrates states that some of life's greatest blessings flow from mania, specifically in the four kinds of mania: (1) prophetic; (2) poetic; (3) cathartic; and (4) erotic. It is in this context that Socrates' Myth of the Cicadas is presented. The Cicadas chirp and watch to see whether their music lulls humans to laziness or whether the humans can resist their sweet song. Cicadas were once humans who, in ancient times, allowed the first Muses to enchant them into singing and dancing for so long they stopped eating and sleeping and died without noticing. The Muses rewarded them with the gift of never needing food or sleep, and of singing from birth to death. The task of the Cicadas is to watch humans and report who honors the Muses and who does not.

In the dialogue, Socrates affirms that nymphs and local divinities or spirits of place inhabit the countryside; talks of the Muses and nature gods such as Pan; in addition he indulges in an extended exegesis of his own dæmon; waxes lyrical, connecting divine inspiration to religion, poetry, art and love; all of which are informed and set in poignant relief by the cicada chorus.

== See also ==
- Tithonus
