= Cohere =

Canadian artificial intelligence company

Cohere Inc.
- Type: Private
- Industry: Natural language processing; Artificial intelligence
- Founded: 2019; 7 years ago
- Founders: Aidan Gomez; Ivan Zhang; Nick Frosst
- Headquarters: Toronto, Ontario, Canada
- Area served: Worldwide
- Key people: Aidan Gomez (CEO); Joëlle Pineau (chief AI officer); Phil Blunsom (chief scientist)
- Products: Command A+ (May 20, 2026); Command A Reasoning; Command A Translate; Command A Vision; Cohere North; Aya Vision
- Revenue: $240M (February 2026)
- Number of employees: 450+ (2025)
- Website: cohere.com

Cohere Inc. is a Canadian multinational technology company focused on artificial intelligence. Cohere specializes in large language models and AI products for regulated industries, particularly the finance, healthcare, manufacturing, and energy fields, as well as the public sector. Cohere was founded in 2019 by Aidan Gomez, Ivan Zhang, and Nick Frosst and is headquartered in Toronto, with offices in Montreal, New York City, San Francisco, London, Paris, and Seoul. In April 2026, Cohere agreed to acquire German AI firm Aleph Alpha.

== History ==
In 2017, a team of researchers at Google Brain introduced the transformer machine learning architecture in "Attention Is All You Need", which demonstrated state-of-the-art performance on a variety of natural language processing tasks. In 2019, Aidan Gomez, one of its co-authors, along with Nick Frosst, another researcher at Google Brain, founded Cohere with Ivan Zhang, with whom Gomez had done research at FOR.ai. All of the co-founders attended the University of Toronto.

Gomez is the company's CEO. In December 2022, Martin Kon, the former CFO of YouTube, became president and COO.

In November 2021, Google Cloud announced they would help power Cohere's platform using their infrastructure, and Cloud's TPUs would be used by Cohere for the development and deployment of their products.

In June 2022, Cohere launched Cohere Labs (previously called Cohere For AI), a nonprofit research lab and community to contributing open-source, fundamental machine learning research. It was led by Sara Hooker, a former research scientist at Google Brain until her departure in September 2025. Cohere Labs is now led by Marzieh Fadaee.

In December 2022, Cohere released a multilingual model for understanding text that would work with over 100 languages, to help users search for documents by meaning instead of keywords. This type of process was not previously widely available in languages other than English.

On September 12, 2023, it was announced that Cohere had become one of fifteen tech companies to sign on to a voluntary White House commitment on measures for testing, reporting, and research on the risks of AI. On September 27, 2023, it was announced that Cohere had also signed Canada's voluntary code of conduct for AI, to promote the responsible development and management of advanced generative AI systems.

In 2024, Cohere opened an office in New York City. In 2025, they expanded to Montreal, Canada, Paris, and Seoul.

In May 2025, Cohere acquired Ottogrid, a Vancouver-based platform that develops enterprise tools for automating certain kinds of market research. In June 2025, it was announced that Cohere had partnered with the governments of Canada and the United Kingdom to expand the use of AI in the public sector. In August 2025, Cohere hired Joelle Pineau as Chief A.I. Officer and Francois Chadwick, a former Uber executive and KPMG US partner, as its first Chief Financial Officer.

On April 10, 2026, Cohere and Aleph Alpha announced that they were in talks to merge, with the potential deal having the support of the German government. On April 24, Cohere and Aleph Alpha announced that Cohere would acquire Aleph Alpha. While the terms of the deal were not publicly disclosed, an anonymous individual told New York Times it would make the combined companies worth $20 billion. The deal was made in a bid to challenge AI dominance from primarily the United States as well as China, with the New York Times noting that they had struggled to keep up in attracting investment from US-based companies. The terms of the deal also involve $600 million in investment to Cohere from Schwarz Gruppe, already prominent investors in Aleph Alpha.

In September 2026, Cohere and Aleph Alpha signed a definitive merger agreement. The combined company will operate under the name Cohere, with headquarters in Toronto and Berlin, while Aleph Alpha's Heidelberg office will focus on research. The transaction remains subject to regulatory approvals.

== Products ==
Considered an alternative to OpenAI, Cohere works on generative AI, building technology that businesses can use to deploy chatbots, search engines, copywriting, summarization, and other AI-driven products. Cohere specializes in large language models: AI trained to digest text from internal data or publicly available sources to understand how to process and respond to prompts with increasing sophistication.

The Cohere platform is available through an API as a managed service and through platforms such as Amazon SageMaker and Google's Vertex AI. It is cloud agnostic and not tied to a particular cloud service. Cohere's generative AI technology is embedded into several Oracle products, and its chat capabilities are embedded into Salesforce products.

In March 2025, Cohere's nonprofit research lab introduced Aya Vision, an AI model that can describe images, translate text, and summarize information. The model is free for research but is not permitted to be used for commercial purposes.

== Partnerships ==
On June 13, 2023, Oracle announced a partnership with Cohere to provide generative AI services to help organizations automate end-to-end business processes. Cohere's technology is integrated into Oracle Fusion Cloud, Oracle NetSuite, and Oracle industry-specific applications. McKinsey announced a collaboration with Cohere, to help organizations integrate generative AI into their operations on July 18, 2023. Cohere also partnered with software company LivePerson to offer customized large language models for businesses in 2023.

In 2024, Cohere partnered with Fujitsu in co-developing Takane, a Japanese LLM.

In January 2025, in partnership with RBC, Cohere introduced North for Banking, a secure generative AI platform in financial services. A partnership with LG developed a Korean LLM and customized the North platform for Korean companies.

In May 2025, Cohere partnered with SAP to integrate its AI models into SAP's Business Suite and make them available through SAP AI Core's generative AI hub. In November 2025, Cohere's North platform was among the AI offerings integrated into the launch of SAP's European AI Cloud.

Cohere announced a collaboration with Dell Technologies, making Dell the first infrastructure provider to offer Cohere North, the company's secure AI workspace platform. Cohere also entered the healthcare sector through a partnership with Ensemble Health Partners, a revenue cycle management company, to deploy agentic AI solutions for healthcare providers' administrative workflows.

In July 2025, Cohere announced a partnership with Bell Canada to provide AI services to government and enterprise customers. Bell Canada will deploy Cohere's technology on its data centre infrastructure and offer AI solutions to clients. Bell also implemented Cohere's North platform for internal operations.

In December 2025, Thales Group and Cohere partnered to apply AI systems in naval and maritime defence operations.

Hanwha Ocean contracted with Cohere in January 2026 to integrate its generative AI technologies in ship design and procurement processes.

In March 2026, Saab AB announced a partnership with Cohere that utilizes the latter's AI technologies to support the GlobalEye surveillance aircraft.

As of April 2026, Cohere provides generative AI solutions for the Aston Martin F1. Cohere's technologies are applied in the teams' engineering, performance assessments, and operations.

== Funding ==
On September 7, 2021, Cohere announced they had raised $40 million in Series A funding led by Index Ventures; Index Ventures partner Mike Volpi also joined Cohere's board. The round also included Radical Ventures, Section 32, and AI-experts Geoffrey Hinton, Fei-Fei Li, Pieter Abbeel, and Raquel Urtasun.

In February 2022, Cohere announced they had raised $125 million in series B funding led by Tiger Global. In June 2023, Cohere raised an additional $270 million in series C funding from investors including Inovia Capital, Oracle, Salesforce, and Nvidia, at a valuation of $2.2 billion.

In March 2024, it was reported that Cohere had an annualized revenue run rate of $22 million and in July 2024 it was reported they received $500 million in funding from investors including Cisco, AMD and Fujitsu at a valuation of $5.5 billion.

In December 2024, Cohere received $240 million in public funding from the Canadian government as part of the Canadian Sovereign AI Compute Strategy to support the construction of a domestic AI data center.

As of May 2025, Cohere's annual revenue was reported to be $100 million. In October 2025, Cohere's annualized revenue reached $150 million. In February 2026, CNBC reported Cohere's revenue as $240 million.

In 2025, Cohere raised US$500 million in a funding round led by Radical Ventures and Inovia Capital, for a valuation of US$6.8 billion. Inovia's Patrick Pichette was appointed to Cohere's Board of Directors.

In September 2025, Cohere announced a second funding round, raising an additional $100 million and increasing its valuation to approximately $7 billion. The new investors included the Business Development Bank of Canada and Nexxus Capital Management.

== Awards ==
Cohere was listed on the Forbes AI 50 list in 2022, 2023, 2024, and 2025.

Fortune magazine listed the company on their 50 AI innovators list in 2023.

Cohere was listed on CNBC's Disruptor list in 2023 and 2024.

== Litigation ==
In February 2025, a consortium of 14 publishing companies including The Atlantic, Condé Nast, and Forbes sued Cohere for copyright infringement, accusing Cohere of using their content for training without permission, as well as displaying considerable portions or entire articles of their content without permission.
