= Nick Frosst =

Canadian AI researcher & singer (born 1993)

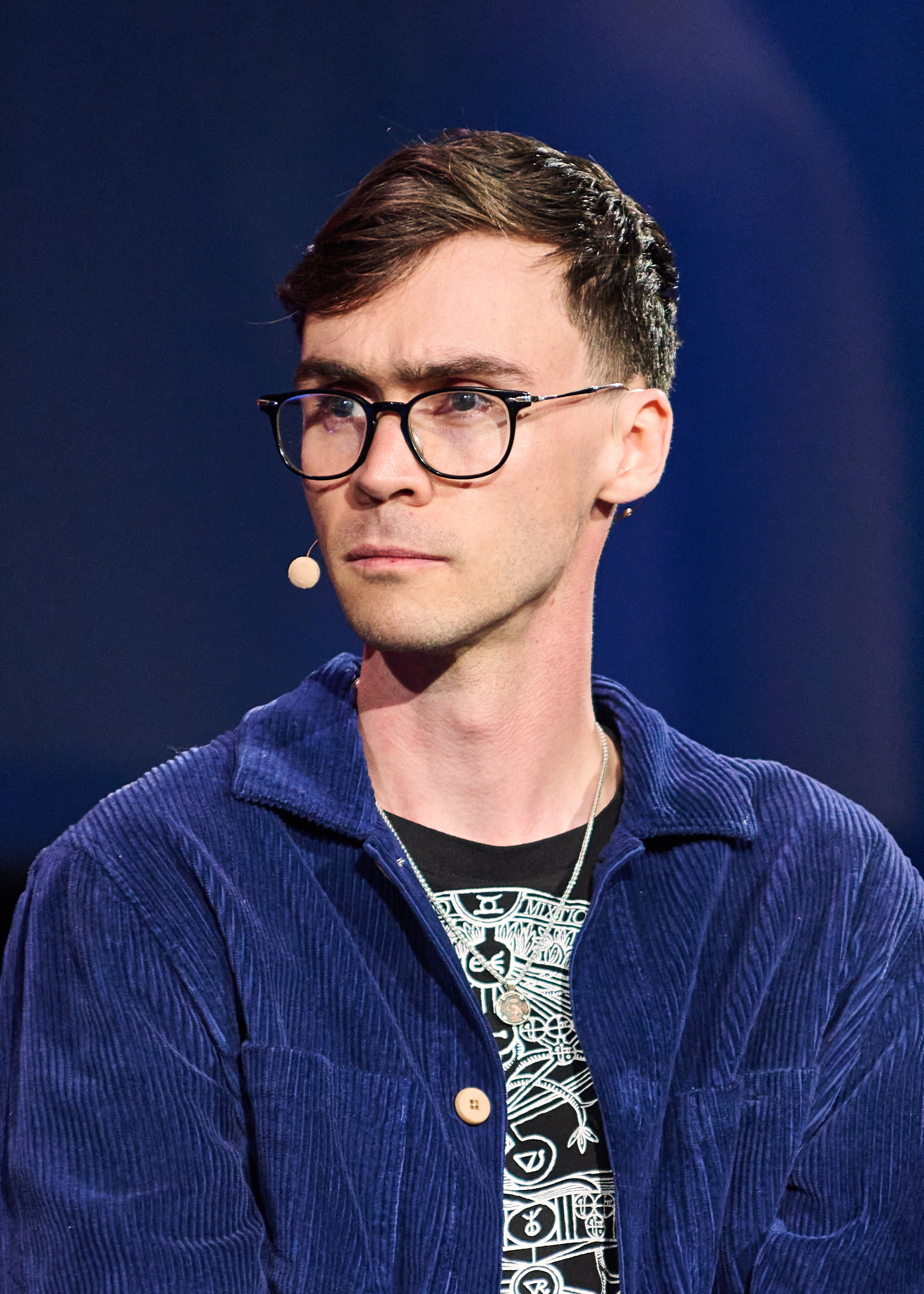
- Frosst in 2025
- Born: January 5, 1993 (age 33)
- Education: University of Toronto (B.S.)
- Occupations: Computer scientist; Musician
- Known for: Co-founder of Cohere; Lead singer of Good Kid
- Scientific career
- Fields: Computer science; Machine learning
- Workplaces: Google Brain
- Academic advisors: Geoffrey Hinton
- Musical career
- Genre: Indie rock
- Instrument: Vocals
- Years active: 2015–present
- Member of: Good Kid
- Website: nickfrosst.com

Nicholas Frosst (born January 5, 1993) is a Canadian computer scientist and musician. He co-founded Cohere, a Toronto-based artificial intelligence company. He is also the lead singer in the indie rock band Good Kid.

== Early life and education ==
Frosst was born on January 5, 1993. Frosst earned a Bachelor of Science degree in computer science and cognitive science from the University of Toronto in 2015. He was a student of Geoffrey Hinton, who also hired Frosst at Google Brain.

== Career ==
Frosst was among Geoffrey Hinton's earliest hires at Google Brain in Toronto, working as a machine learning researcher on deep learning and neural network architectures. He worked there from 2016 to 2020.

Frosst co-founded Cohere with Aidan Gomez and Ivan Zhang in 2019. The company builds large language models and enterprise AI tools.

Frosst has publicly explained Cohere's focus on industries like finance and health, where there are privacy and other regulatory considerations. Frosst has also spoken openly about his belief that artificial intelligence will not replace humans, but rather streamline and automate mundane tasks, and his belief that AGI is less "imminent" than many in the field claim, a position in dissent with his mentor Hinton.

Frosst and the other Cohere co-founders were listed first on Maclean's AI Trailblazers Power List and The Logic's Innovation Leaders.

== Music ==
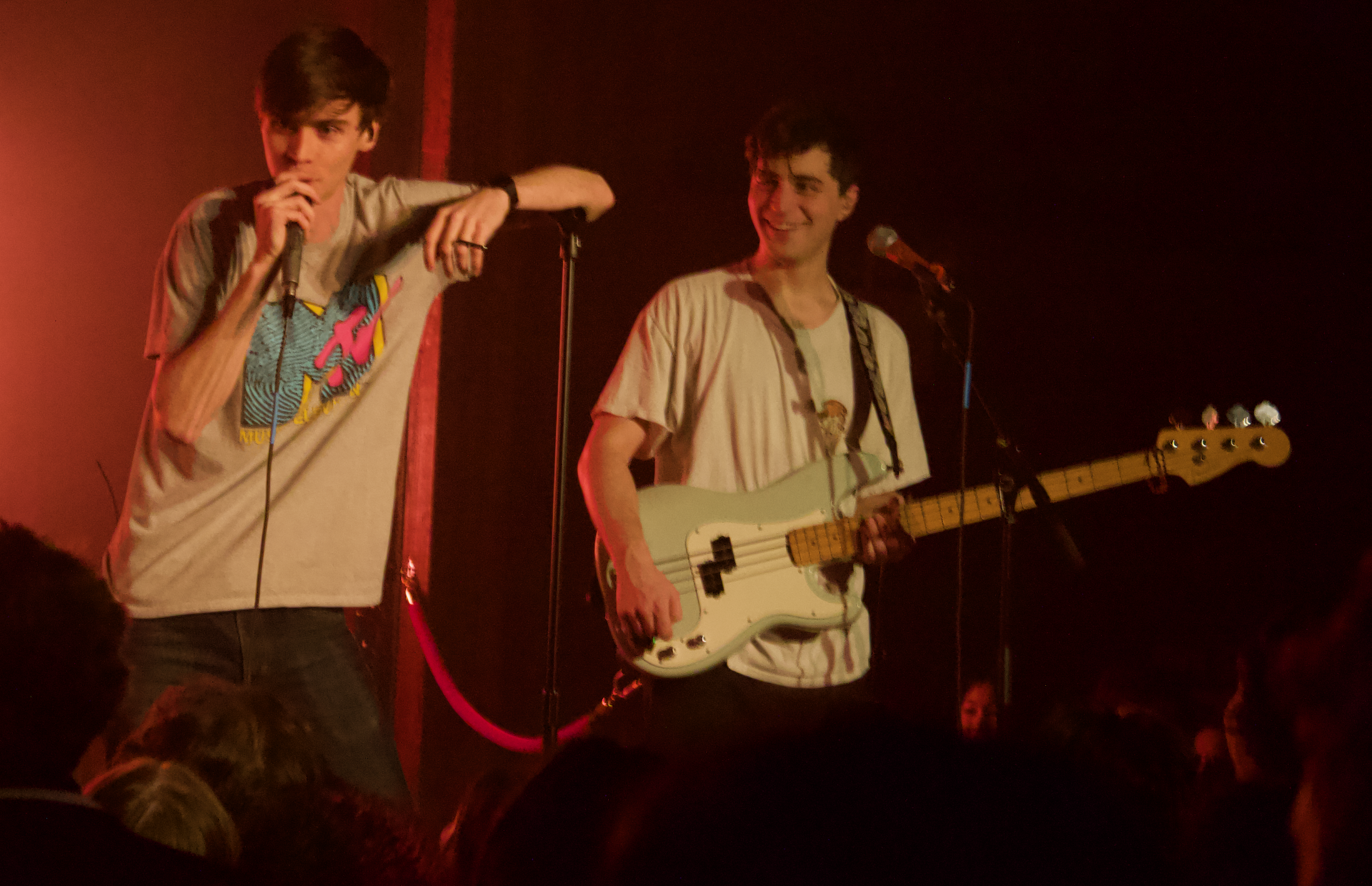
Frosst (left) with bassist Michael Kozakov during a Good Kid performance in 2023

After spending time in a prior band which played "weird" music featuring a glockenspiel, Frosst and fellow computer science students at the University of Toronto formed the indie rock band Good Kid in 2015. Frosst is the lead vocalist for the band. While on tour with the band, Frosst continues his work in the tech industry remotely. Frosst has described the band as a way for him to relax and not constantly think about tech. His vocals have been compared to that of Kele Okereke.

In 2024, the band was nominated for the Juno Awards Breakthrough Group of the Year. As of 2026, the band, which has performed at Lollapalooza, has 3.1 million monthly Spotify listeners.

== Discography ==
=== Good Kid ===
- Can We Hang Out Sometime? (2026)
