= A Matter of Time Tour =

2025–2026 concert tour by Laufey

- Tour by Laufey
- Official tour poster
- Location: Asia; Europe; North America; Oceania
- Associated album: A Matter of Time
- Start date: 15 September 2025
- End date: 12 September 2026
- Legs: 4
- No. of shows: 70
- Supporting acts: Suki Waterhouse; Alice Phoebe Lou; Elín Hall; Potatoi (John Cha); Leonie Biney; Amie Blu

Laufey concert chronology
- Bewitched Tour (2023–2024); A Matter of Time Tour (2025–2026)

The A Matter of Time Tour was the third concert tour by Icelandic musician Laufey. It began on 15 September 2025 in Orlando, United States, and concluded in Mexico City, Mexico, on 12 September 2026, comprising 70 shows. English singer-songwriter, actress, and model Suki Waterhouse served as the opening act for the North American leg, with South African musician Alice Phoebe Lou served as the opening act for the UK and European dates, and Icelandic musician Elín Hall served as the opening act for the Icelandic dates. South Korean musician Potatoi (John Cha) served as the opening act for the South Korea date. British singer-songwriter Leonie Biney served as the opening act for the Australia and New Zealand dates.

== Background ==
On 22 August 2025, Laufey released her third full-length album, A Matter of Time. On 29 May 2025, Laufey announced she would embark on a North American headlining tour, marking her first all-arena concert tour. The pre-sale and general sale dates were announced concurrently. Pre-sales started on 3 June, while general sales began on 6 June 2025. On 3 June 2025, Laufey added extra dates for Los Angeles, Oakland, New York and Toronto due to demand. Laufey rehearsed for the major North American tour in Clarksville, Tennessee, located about an hour north of Nashville at F&M Bank Arena using the space in Clarksville to prepare and rehearse for the large-scale arena production before kicking off the tour. On 5 September 2025, Laufey announced the European leg of the tour for 2026. Presale tickets went on sale from 9 September, and the general sale started on 12 September 2025. Additional dates for London and Kópavogur were announced the same day as the general sale. On 4 March 2026, an Asian, Australian, and New Zealand leg of the tour was announced, comprising 16 shows. On 11 March, extra Pasay (Manila), Melbourne and Sydney dates were added due to demand. On 3 April, new Beijing and Shanghai dates were announced. On 9 April, a third Melbourne date was added. On 22 April, new Chengdu and Guangzhou dates were announced. On 2 June, a Latin American leg of the tour was announced, with dates in São Paulo and Mexico City.

== Set list ==
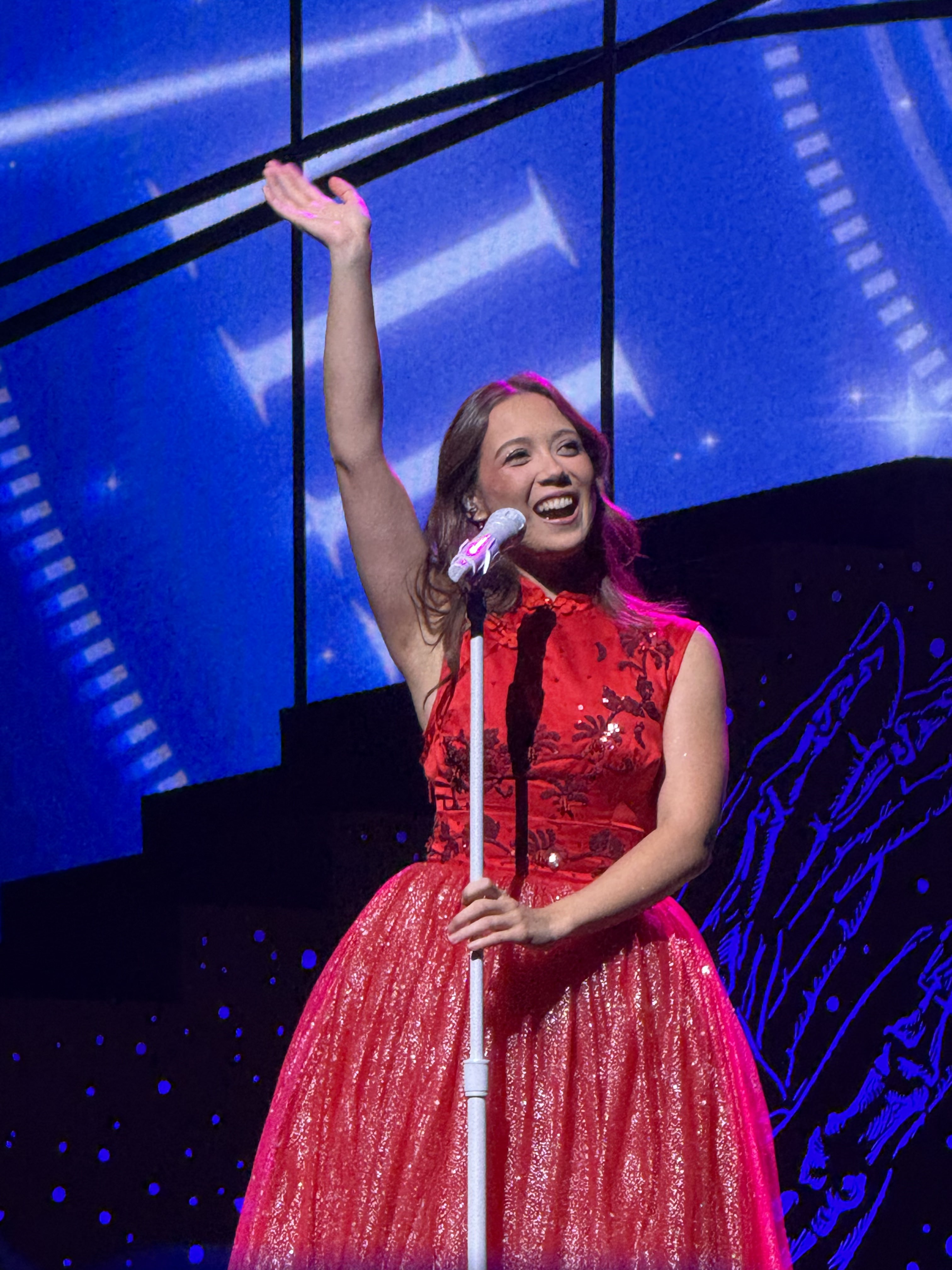
Laufey performing "Clockwork" in Pasay

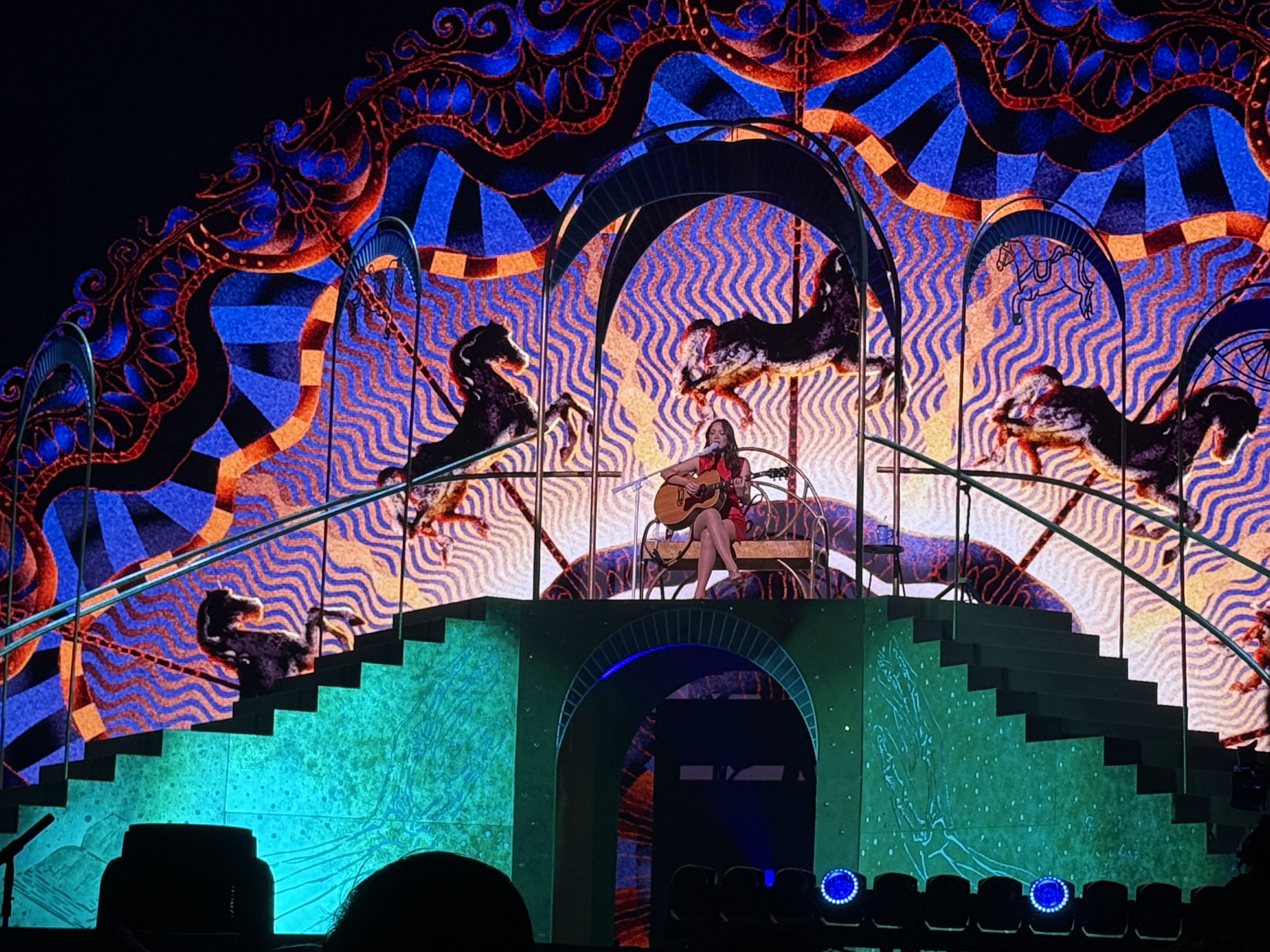
Laufey performing "Carousel" in Pasay

This set list is from the 15 September 2025, concert in Orlando, Florida. It does not represent all of the concerts for the duration of the tour.

Act l

1. "Clockwork"
2. "Lover Girl"
3. "Dreamer"
4. "Falling Behind"
5. "Silver Lining"
6. "Bored"
7. "Too Little, Too Late" / "Bewitched - String Quartet Edition"

Act II

1. "Seems Like Old Times"
2. "Valentine"
3. "Fragile"
4. "While You Were Sleeping"
5. "Let You Break My Heart Again"

Act lll

13. "Carousel"
14. "Forget-Me-Not"
15. "Cuckoo Ballet (Interlude)"

Act lV

16. "Mr. Eclectic"
17. "Castle in Hollywood"
18. "Promise"
19. "Goddess"
20. "Tough Luck"
21. "Snow White"
22. "From the Start"

Act V

23. "Sabotage"
24. "Letter to My 13 Year Old Self"

=== Surprise songs ===
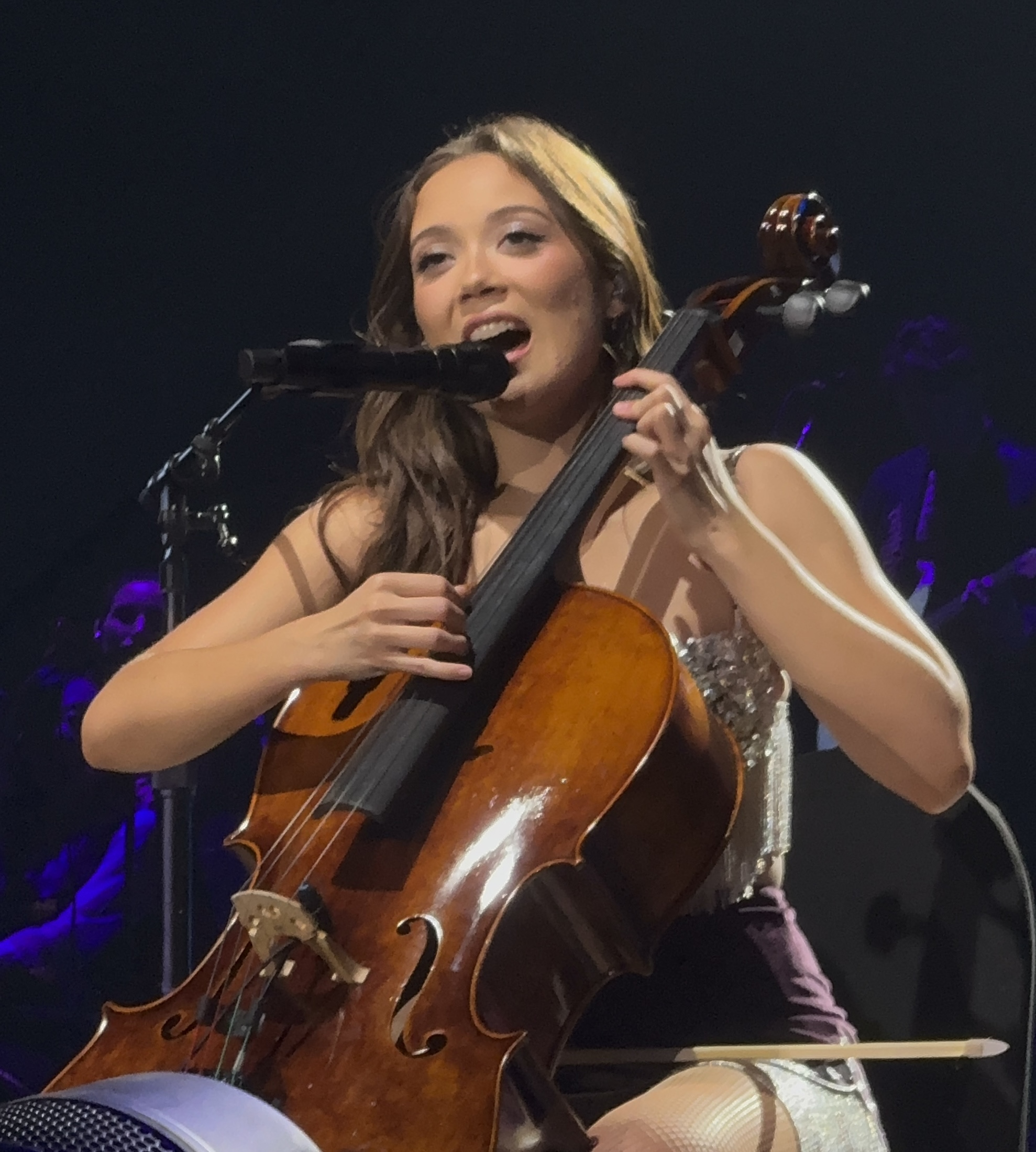
Laufey performing the surprise song "I Wish You Love" on the cello in Pasay

Built into the set was a special surprise song, a rounding track that changed by show, starting from the 18 September show in Fort Worth. Laufey occasionally brought out special guests to perform the surprise song with her throughout the tour. Some shows had two surprise songs.

Date (2025)	City	Surprise song
18 September	Fort Worth	"Clean Air"
20 September	Houston	"The Risk"
21 September	Austin	"Haunted"
23 September	Glendale	"Somethin' Stupid" (with Benson Boone)
24 September	San Diego	"Lovesick"
26 September	Los Angeles	"Magnolia" (with Hozier)
27 September	Los Angeles	"Gabriela" (a cappella with Katseye)
29 September	Oakland	"I Wish You Love"
30 September	San Francisco	"California and Me"
2 October	Vancouver	"Misty"
4 October	Seattle	"Serendipity"
6 October	Salt Lake City	"Street by Street"
8 October	Morrison	"It Could Happen to You"
8 October	Morrison	"Clean Air"
10 October	Chicago	"Bewitched"
11 October	Minneapolis	"Second Best"
13 October	Nashville	"Dear Soulmate"
15 October	New York City	"A Cautionary Tale"
16 October	New York City	"Best of Wives and Best of Women" (with Lin-Manuel Miranda)
16 October	New York City	"Illegal" (with PinkPantheress)
19 October	Toronto	"A Night To Remember"
20 October	Toronto	"Above the Chinese Restaurant"
21 October	Laval	"Like the Movies"
23 October	Washington DC	"Just Like Chet"
25 October	Philadelphia	"Questions For The Universe"
27 October	Boston	"Slow Down"
27 October	Boston	"Santa Claus Is Comin' To Town"

Date (2026)	City	Surprise song
18 February	Zurich	"How I Get"
19 February	Düsseldorf	"How I Get"
22 February	Copenhagen	"How I Get"
24 February	Berlin	"How I Get"
26 February	Vienna	"How I Get"
28 February	Brussels	"How I Get"
1 March	Amsterdam	"How I Get"
2 March	Paris	"How I Get"
4 March	Manchester	"Misty" (with Jeff Goldblum)
4 March	Manchester	"How I Get"
6 March	Dublin	"Second Best"
6 March	Dublin	"How I Get"
8 March	London	"Second Best"
9 March	London	"How I Get"
14 March	Kópavogur	"Second Best"
15 March	Kópavogur	"How I Get"
19 May	Singapore	"I'll Forget About You (In Time)"
23 May	Tangerang	"Castle in Hollywood"
26 May	Pasay	"I Wish You Love"
27 May	Pasay	"How I Get"
28 May	Pasay	"Magnolia"
28 May	Pasay	"Castle in Hollywood"
31 May	Pak Kret	"I'll Forget About You (In Time)"
2 June	Kuala Lumpur	"Castle in Hollywood"
5 June	Tokyo	"Lovesick"
7 June	Goyang	"Above the Chinese Restaurant"
14 June	Beijing	"I Wait, I Wait, I Wait"
17 June	Shanghai	"Castle in Hollywood"
25 July	Perth	"Old Devil Moon"
25 July	Perth	"Haunted"
25 July	Perth	"Castle in Hollywood"
28 July	Adelaide	"Castle in Hollywood"
30 July	Melbourne	"Slow Down"
31 July	Melbourne	"Second Best"
1 August	Melbourne	"How I Get"
3 August	Brisbane	"Castle in Hollywood"
7 August	Sydney	"How I Get"
8 August	Sydney	"Castle in Hollywood"
12 August	Auckland	"Slow Down"

== Tour dates ==
List of 2025 concerts
Date	City	Country	Venue	Opening act(s)
15 September	Orlando	United States	Kia Center	Suki Waterhouse
16 September	Atlanta	United States	State Farm Arena	Suki Waterhouse
18 September	Fort Worth	United States	Dickies Arena	Suki Waterhouse
20 September	Houston	United States	Toyota Center	Suki Waterhouse
21 September	Austin	United States	Moody Center	Suki Waterhouse
23 September	Glendale	United States	Desert Diamond Arena	Suki Waterhouse
24 September	San Diego	United States	Pechanga Arena	Suki Waterhouse
26 September	Los Angeles	United States	Crypto.com Arena	Suki Waterhouse
27 September	Los Angeles	United States	Crypto.com Arena	Suki Waterhouse
29 September	Oakland	United States	Oakland Arena	Suki Waterhouse
30 September	San Francisco	United States	Chase Center	Suki Waterhouse
2 October	Vancouver	Canada	Rogers Arena	Suki Waterhouse
4 October	Seattle	United States	Climate Pledge Arena	Suki Waterhouse
6 October	Salt Lake City	United States	Delta Center	Suki Waterhouse
8 October	Morrison	United States	Red Rocks Amphitheatre	Suki Waterhouse
10 October	Chicago	United States	United Center	Suki Waterhouse
11 October	Minneapolis	United States	Target Center	Suki Waterhouse
13 October	Nashville	United States	Bridgestone Arena	Suki Waterhouse
15 October	New York City	United States	Madison Square Garden	Suki Waterhouse
16 October	New York City	United States	Madison Square Garden	Suki Waterhouse
19 October	Toronto	Canada	Scotiabank Arena	Suki Waterhouse
20 October	Toronto	Canada	Scotiabank Arena	Suki Waterhouse
21 October	Laval	Canada	Place Bell	Suki Waterhouse
23 October	Washington, D.C.	United States	Capital One Arena	Suki Waterhouse
24 October	Philadelphia	United States	Xfinity Mobile Arena	Suki Waterhouse
27 October	Boston	United States	TD Garden	Suki Waterhouse

List of 2026 concerts
Date	City	Country	Venue	Opening act(s)
18 February	Zürich	Switzerland	Hallenstadion	Alice Phoebe Lou
19 February	Düsseldorf	Germany	Mitsubishi Electric Halle	Alice Phoebe Lou
22 February	Copenhagen	Denmark	Royal Arena	Alice Phoebe Lou
24 February	Berlin	Germany	Velodrom	Alice Phoebe Lou
26 February	Vienna	Austria	Wiener Stadthalle	Alice Phoebe Lou
28 February	Brussels	Belgium	ING Arena	Alice Phoebe Lou
1 March	Amsterdam	Netherlands	Ziggo Dome	Alice Phoebe Lou
2 March	Paris	France	Adidas Arena	Alice Phoebe Lou
4 March	Manchester	England	Co-op Live	Alice Phoebe Lou
6 March	Dublin	Ireland	3Arena	Alice Phoebe Lou
8 March	London	England	The O_{2} Arena	Alice Phoebe Lou
9 March	London	England	The O_{2} Arena	Alice Phoebe Lou
11 March	Bergamo	Italy	ChorusLife Arena	—N/a
14 March	Kópavogur	Iceland	Kórinn Arena	Elín Hall
15 March	Kópavogur	Iceland	Kórinn Arena	Elín Hall
21 March	Lisbon	Portugal	Coliseu dos Recreios	—N/a
22 March	Barcelona	Spain	Auditori de Forum	—N/a
12 May	Hong Kong		AsiaWorld–Expo	—N/a
15 May	Taoyuan (Note: Labelled as Taipei in promotional material.)	Taiwan	NTSU Arena	—N/a
19 May	Singapore		Singapore Indoor Stadium	—N/a
23 May	Tangerang Regency (Note: Labelled as Jakarta in promotional material.)	Indonesia	Nusantara International Convention Exhibition	—N/a
26 May	Pasay (Note: Labelled as Manila in promotional material.)	Philippines	Mall of Asia Arena	—N/a
27 May	Pasay	Philippines	Mall of Asia Arena	—N/a
28 May	Pasay	Philippines	Mall of Asia Arena	—N/a
31 May	Pak Kret (Note: Labelled as Bangkok in promotional material.)	Thailand	Impact Arena	—N/a
2 June	Kuala Lumpur	Malaysia	Axiata Arena	—N/a
5 June	Tokyo	Japan	Tokyo Garden Theater	—N/a
7 June	Goyang (Note: Labelled as Seoul in promotional material.)	South Korea	Korean International Exhibition Center	Potatoi
11 June	Chengdu	China	Chengdu Financial City Performing Arts Center	—N/a
13 June	Guangzhou	China	Guangzhou Gymnasium	—N/a
15 June	Beijing	China	Capital Indoor Stadium	—N/a
17 June	Shanghai	China	Mercedes-Benz Arena	—N/a
25 July	Perth	Australia	RAC Arena	Leonie Biney
28 July	Adelaide	Australia	Adelaide Entertainment Centre Arena	Leonie Biney
30 July	Melbourne	Australia	Rod Laver Arena	Leonie Biney
31 July	Melbourne	Australia	Rod Laver Arena	Leonie Biney
1 August	Melbourne	Australia	Rod Laver Arena	Leonie Biney
3 August	Brisbane	Australia	Brisbane Entertainment Centre	Leonie Biney
7 August	Sydney	Australia	Afterpay Arena	Leonie Biney
8 August	Sydney	Australia	Afterpay Arena	Leonie Biney
12 August	Auckland	New Zealand	Spark Arena	Leonie Biney
7 September (Note: This concert is part of Rock in Rio.)	Rio de Janeiro	Brazil	Barra Olympic Park	—N/a
9 September	São Paulo	Brazil	Espaço Unimed	Amie Blu
12 September	Mexico City	Mexico	Palacio de los Deportes	Amie Blu
