= Snow White (song) =

2025 single by Laufey

Single by Laufey

from the album A Matter of Time
- Released: 7 August 2025
- Genre: Chamber pop
- Length: 3:13
- Label: Vingolf; AWAL
- Songwriter: Laufey
- Producers: Laufey; Spencer Stewart

Laufey singles chronology
"Lover Girl" (2025)	"Snow White" (2025)	"Santa Claus Is Comin' to Town" (2025)

Music video
- "Snow White" on YouTube

"Snow White" is a song by Icelandic singer Laufey. It was released on 7 August 2025 as the fourth single from her third studio album, A Matter of Time. The song was written solely by Laufey, and was produced by her and Spencer Stewart. Lyrically, the song addresses impossible beauty standards for women and the pain of never feeling good enough.

== Background ==
On 15 May 2025, Laufey announced her third album, A Matter of Time, with "Snow White" featuring as the third track. Laufey announced the imminent release of the song on 4 August 2025, revealing it to be the final single to be released prior to the album.

== Lyrics and composition ==
Of the song, Laufey explained, “Snow White is about the never ending chase for perfection that comes with being a woman. It’s about looking in the mirror and seeing all the ways in which you can improve yourself”. The song explores unattainable beauty standards, and is titled after the eponymous character from the German fairy tale Snow White, whom Laufey depicts as a perfect woman to whom she can never compare, singing, “"Sometimes I see her. She looks like Snow White / She's everything I am, but my wrongs are turned to right”.

== Live performances ==
Laufey performed the then-unreleased song live for the first time at a show at Union Chapel in London on 30 June 2025, debuting it alongside fellow un-released track "Clean Air", A Matter of Time singles "Silver Lining", "Tough Luck", and "Lover Girl", and a collection of hits from her previous two projects. Prior to the performance, Laufey stated, “this song, I wrote it, it’s very close to my heart. I wrote it in a moment when I was kind of really struggling with my insecurities, and I think it’s kind of like a constant struggle. And I wrote this song when I kind of realized that that struggle might never really go away. And I just wanted to get my frustrations out somewhere — of the standards that the world has set for, you know, achievements and beauty and things, and the standards that I also set for myself. It’s I think maybe one of my favorite new songs that I’ve written. It’s called ‘Snow White,’ and I thought it was kind of poetic because I grew up in Iceland and everyone there is snow white. And also, the country is literally snow white. And actually, I learned that the illustration of Snow White was actually based on an Icelandic woman. So it all sewed together perfectly. But yeah, I love this one”. It subsequently featured in the setlist of her A Matter of Time Tour.

== Music video ==
The video for "Snow White" was released on 7 August 2025, the same day as the single. It was filmed in Laufey's native Iceland and directed by her twin sister and creative director Junia Lin.

== Charts ==
Weekly chart performance for "Snow White"
Chart (2025)	Peak position
Iceland (Tónlistinn)	18
New Zealand Hot Singles (RMNZ)	28
US Hot Rock & Alternative Songs (Billboard)	20
