= The Longest Goodbye (song) =

2025 single by Role Model featuring Laufey

Single by Role Model featuring Laufey

from the album Kansas Anymore (The Longest Goodbye)
- Released: July 9, 2025
- Recorded: 2025
- Genre: Jazz pop; Indie pop; Indie folk
- Length: 2:50
- Label: Interscope
- Songwriters: Tucker Pillsbury; Laufey Jónsdóttir; Noah Conrad; Mason Stoops
- Producers: Noah Conrad; Mason Stoops

Role Model singles chronology
"Sally, When the Wine Runs Out" (2025)	"The Longest Goodbye" (2025)	"Saddle Again" (2025)

Laufey singles chronology
"Lover Girl" (2025)	"The Longest Goodbye" (2025)	"Snow White" (2025)

Music video
- "The Longest Goodbye" on YouTube

"The Longest Goodbye" is a song by American singer-songwriter Role Model, featuring Icelandic singer-songwriter Laufey. It was released on July 9, 2025, through Interscope Records, as the sixth single from the deluxe edition of Role Model's second studio album, Kansas Anymore (The Longest Goodbye) (2025). Written by Role Model, Noah Conrad, and Mason Stoops, with additional writing from Laufey for the duet version, the track is a pensive indie pop and jazz-influenced acoustic ballad.

Following its release, the song appeared on the New Zealand Hot Singles Chart.

== Background and release ==
The solo version of "The Longest Goodbye" originally served as the closing track for the deluxe edition of Role Model's second album, Kansas Anymore (The Longest Goodbye), released on February 14, 2025. The inspiration for a duet version arose during the Los Angeles stop of his "No Place Like Tour" in May 2025. During the residency, Role Model invited Laufey to join him onstage for a surprise performance of the track.

Reacting to the audience's positive reception and their shared vocal chemistry, Role Model announced via Instagram that a professional studio version featuring Laufey had been recorded. The duet was officially released as a single on July 9, 2025.

== Composition ==
The production and melody evoke a feeling of listening to a heartbroken cowboy strum a somber song on his acoustic guitar in the quiet saloon of a crackly old Western movie.

— Sarah Space, Melodic Magazine

"The Longest Goodbye" is an acoustic ballad described as "pensive" and "Southern-inspired." It is driven by intimate acoustic guitar work and minimal production handled by Noah Conrad and Mason Stoops. The song marks a departure from Role Model's earlier alt-pop style, leaning into the indie folk and Americana influences found throughout the Kansas Anymore era.

Lyrically, the song describes the "sorrowful conclusion" reached at the end of a relationship after a period of conflict and misery. The duet format transforms the narrative into a conversation between two individuals, with Laufey’s verses adding a "wistful, melancholic touch."

== Music video ==
The official music video for "The Longest Goodbye" was released alongside the single on July 9, 2025. Directed by Neema Sadeghi, the visual utilizes a vintage, black-and-white aesthetic to complement the song’s nostalgic tone.

The video features Role Model and Laufey performing in a classic studio style with a full band using retro instruments. Role Model later revealed that the audio for the video was captured live during the shoot to maintain a "vulnerable and raw" feel.

== Commercial performance ==
Following the release of the duet version in July 2025, the song saw a resurgence in streaming and airplay. It reached a peak of number 30 on the Recorded Music NZ Hot Singles Chart

== Charts ==
Weekly chart performance for "The Longest Goodbye"
Chart (2025)	Peak position
New Zealand Hot Singles (RMNZ)	30
