= Chuck On Tour =

2026–2027 concert tour by Role Model

- Tour by Role Model
- Location: Europe; North America
- Associated album: Chuck Timely & the Hourglass
- Start date: September 9, 2026
- End date: February 28, 2027
- No. of shows: 35
- Supporting acts: Samia; Keni Titus

Role Model concert chronology
- No Place Like Tour (2024–2025); Chuck On Tour (2026–2027)

The Chuck On Tour is the ongoing third headlining concert tour by American singer-songwriter Role Model in support of his third studio album Chuck Timely & the Hourglass (2026). It began on September 9, 2026, in Bend, Oregon and is set to conclude on February 28, 2027, in Manchester, England, consisting of 35 dates across North America and Europe. Samia and Keni Titus will join as opening acts.

== Background ==
On June 18, 2026, Role Model announced the Chuck on Tour dates for the tour to support the album. He will be supported by Samia and Keni Titus throughout the tour.

== Tour dates ==
List of 2026 concerts
Date (2026)	City	Country	Venue	Opening act(s)	Attendance	Revenue
September 9	Bend	United States	Hayden Homes Amphitheater	Samia	—N/a	—N/a
September 11	Seattle	United States	WaMu Theater	Samia	—N/a	—N/a
September 12	Vancouver	Canada	Freedom Mobile Arch	Samia	—N/a	—N/a
September 15	Sandy	United States	The Plaza at America First Field	Samia	—N/a	—N/a
September 16	Morrison, Colorado	United States	Red Rocks Amphitheatre	Samia	—N/a	—N/a
September 18	Minneapolis	United States	Minneapolis Armory	Samia	—N/a	—N/a
September 19	Chicago	United States	The Salt Shed	Samia	—N/a	—N/a
September 20	Chicago	United States	The Salt Shed	Samia	—N/a	—N/a
September 22	Washington, D.C.	United States	The Anthem	Samia	—N/a	—N/a
September 23	Philadelphia	United States	Skyline Stage	Samia	—N/a	—N/a
September 25	New York City	United States	Radio City Music Hall	Samia	—N/a	—N/a
September 26	New York City	United States	Radio City Music Hall	Samia	—N/a	—N/a
September 27	Boston	United States	Leader Bank Pavilion	Samia	—N/a	—N/a
September 30	Sterling Heights	United States	Michigan Lottery Amphitheatre	Samia	—N/a	—N/a
October 1	Pittsburgh	United States	Citizens Live at The Wylie	Samia	—N/a	—N/a
October 3	Atlanta	United States	Synovus Bank Amphitheater	Samia	—N/a	—N/a
October 4	Nashville	United States	The Truth	Samia	—N/a	—N/a
October 6	Houston	United States	713 Music Hall	Samia	—N/a	—N/a
October 7	Austin	United States	Moody Amphitheater	Samia	—N/a	—N/a
October 9	Irving	United States	The Pavilion at Toyota Music Factory	Samia	—N/a	—N/a
October 10	Oklahoma City	United States	Zoo Amphitheatre	Samia	—N/a	—N/a
October 12	Phoenix	United States	Arizona Financial Theatre	Samia	—N/a	—N/a
October 13	San Diego	United States	Cal Coast Credit Union Open Air Theatre	Samia	—N/a	—N/a
October 15	Los Angeles	United States	Greek Theatre	Samia	—N/a	—N/a
October 16	Los Angeles	United States	Greek Theatre	Samia	—N/a	—N/a
October 19 (rescheduled from 10/18 due to illness)	Berkeley	United States	Hearst Greek Theatre	Samia	—N/a	—N/a

List of 2027 concerts
Date (2027)	City	Country	Venue	Opening act(s)	Attendance	Revenue
February 11	Berlin	Germany	Tempodrom	Keni Titus	—N/a	—N/a
February 13	Amsterdam	Netherlands	AFAS Live	Keni Titus	—N/a	—N/a
February 14	Amsterdam	Netherlands	AFAS Live	Keni Titus	—N/a	—N/a
February 15	Brussels	Belgium	Forest National	Keni Titus	—N/a	—N/a
February 17	Düsseldorf	Germany	Mitsubishi Electric Halle	Keni Titus	—N/a	—N/a
February 19	Paris	France	Zénith Paris	Keni Titus	—N/a	—N/a
February 22	Dublin	Ireland	3Arena	Keni Titus	—N/a	—N/a
February 24	London	England	OVO Arena Wembley	Keni Titus	—N/a	—N/a
February 28	Manchester	England	AO Arena	Keni Titus	—N/a	—N/a
Total
