= High Hopes 3000 =

2026 single by Role Model

Single by Role Model

from the album Chuck Timely & the Hourglass
- Released: June 3, 2026
- Length: 4:05
- Label: Interscope
- Songwriters: Tucker Pillsbury; Mason Stoops; Taylor Mackall; Kane Ritchotte; Remy Morritt; Harrison Whitford
- Producers: Mason Stoops; Taylor Mackall; Kane Ritchotte

Role Model singles chronology
"Saddle Again" (2025)	"High Hopes 3000" (2026)	"Joy" (2026)

Music video
- "High Hopes 3000" on YouTube

"High Hopes 3000" is a song by American singer-songwriter Role Model, released on June 3, 2026 as the lead single from his third studio album Chuck Timely & the Hourglass (2026). He wrote the song with its producers Mason Stoops, Taylor Mackall and Kane Ritchotte, Remy Morritt, and Harrison Whitford.

== Background ==
"High Hopes 3000" was one of the first songs that Role Model created for Chuck Timely & the Hourglass. He had conceived the line "Does love come around or does one come around to it?" long before writing the song, and decided to set up the album with that question.

== Composition ==
The song includes elements of rock and roll. Lyrically, Role Model describes his loneliness as he seeks connection within the Los Angeles nightlife, as well as his cynicism about romance.

== Critical reception ==
Allyson Franzo of Melodic Magazine gave a positive review of the song, opining it to be compelling because of the contradiction between hope and doubt, highlighting Role Model's desire for optimism while expecting disappointment. Franzo also praised the singer's "relaxed, conversational delivery that makes the lyrics feel personal and down-to-earth", as well as his focus on "subtle vulnerability". Daisy Carter of DIY called the song a "earworm hoedown".

== Music video ==
The music video was filmed in Piermont, New York and released alongside the song on June 3, 2026. In it, Role Model portrays his alter ego Chuck Timely as a jean jacket-wearing mechanic who angers his boss with his slacker attitude and roller skates around town

== Charts ==
Chart performance for "High Hopes 3000"
Chart (2026)	Peak position
Australia (ARIA)	89
Canada Mainstream Rock (Billboard Canada)	30
Canada Modern Rock (Billboard Canada)	25
Ireland (IRMA)	64
New Zealand Hot Singles (RMNZ)	6
New Zealand Airplay (RCS)	11
UK Singles (Official Charts)	83
US Billboard Hot 100	95
US Hot Rock & Alternative Songs (Billboard)	19
US Rock & Alternative Airplay (Billboard)	35
