= A Matter of Time (Laufey album) =

Studio album by Laufey
- Released: 22 August 2025
- Studios: 8vb (Minneapolis); Electric Lady (New York City); Harpa Concert Hall (Reykjavík); Long Pond (Hudson Valley); Lucy's Meat Market (Los Angeles); Mosey Creative (Los Angeles); Unknown locations (Biarritz, Minneapolis)
- Length: 45:26
- Labels: Vingolf; AWAL
- Producers: Laufey; Spencer Stewart; Aaron Dessner; Iceland Symphony Orchestra

Laufey chronology
Bewitched (2023)	A Matter of Time (2025)

Singles from A Matter of Time
- 1. "Silver Lining" Released: 3 April 2025; 2. "Tough Luck" Released: 15 May 2025; 3. "Lover Girl" Released: 25 June 2025; 4. "Snow White" Released: 7 August 2025

A Matter of Time is the third studio album by Icelandic singer-songwriter Laufey. It was released on 22 August 2025, through Vingolf Recordings and AWAL. Ahead of the album's release, four singles were issued: "Silver Lining", "Tough Luck", "Lover Girl" and "Snow White". The album was met with acclaim from music critics, and won Best Traditional Pop Vocal Album at the 68th Annual Grammy Awards.

A Matter of Time represents a shift from her earlier focus on jazz preservation toward exploring a more vulnerable and emotionally expressive side. Laufey collaborated with longtime producer Spencer Stewart and Aaron Dessner of the National to develop a sound that balances emotional depth with broader musical influences. Thematically, the album addresses topics such as friendship break-ups, apprehension about love, and personal introspection. Laufey described the project as an opportunity to explore more complex and imperfect aspects of herself. A reissue of the album, titled A Matter of Time: The Final Hour, was released on 10 April 2026.

== Background ==
In 2023, Laufey released her second studio album, Bewitched, along with its companion expanded version, Bewitched: The Goddess Edition (2024). Both received critical and commercial acclaim, further establishing her distinctive blend of jazz, classical, and pop sensibilities.

On 15 May 2025, Laufey announced her third studio album, A Matter of Time, scheduled for release on 22 August 2025. Earlier that year, she was featured as a performer at the 2025 Time's Women of the Year Gala in Los Angeles, an event honouring women around the world who advocate for equality and justice. Introduced by two-time Olympian and gold medalist Jordan Chiles, she closed the evening with a performance that celebrated themes of resilience, hope, and courage. She was also honoured at the annual Gold House Gala, received the Billboard Gold Music honour, and performed an acoustic set of her single "Silver Lining".

== Composition ==
=== Theme and production ===
Every new album for me is a blank book of stories to write. [...] I'm constantly thinking about classical and jazz, how to properly preserve them and pay homage. For this album, I just wanted to let my heart wander. [...] People expect a pretty façade of girly clothes, fantastical stories, and romantic music. This time, I was interested in seeing how I could draw out the most flawed parts of myself and look at them directly in the mirror.

— Laufey, sharing a concept of A Matter of Time

In her previous albums —Everything I Know About Love and Bewitched— Laufey primarily focused on original lovesick ballads influenced by the Great American Songbook, which she refers to as her "bible". Reflecting on this transition while recording her third album in New York, she said, "I used to think that was such a scary thing: that nobody had walked that trail before me. But I now realize that when you're the one determining which steps to take next and which branches to pull to the side, that's when you know you have something good on your hands".

With A Matter of Time, Laufey shifts her focus from preserving the legacy of jazz music —an emphasis in her earlier work— to revealing a more vulnerable, human side of herself. To help realise this shift, she worked with two co-producers: Spencer Stewart, a longtime collaborator, and Aaron Dessner. (Note: Attributed to various sources) In an interview with People, she described the album as more "extroverted", exploring themes like friend break-ups, fear of love, and self-confrontation.

Elle described A Matter of Time as a concept album about "a young woman unraveling", with Laufey exploring a "messier side" of herself that lies beneath her signature romantic aesthetic. In interviews, Laufey expressed a desire to create music "worthy of singing along to", reflecting her experiences of growing from performing classical music to older audiences to headlining venues where her younger fanbase sings her lyrics back to her. She elaborated that the album features "more instrumentation" and feels "louder" and "bigger" to match the scale of her current live performances, describing it as "the most confident" and "most ambitious" album she has made, while also calling it "the most me I've ever been".

=== Songs ===
The album's lead single, "Silver Lining", showcases the album's romantic and emotionally direct approach, with the line "When you go to hell, I'll go there with you, too". Described as a fiery and emotionally charged track by NME, "Tough Luck" explores the aftermath of a failed relationship. "Lover Girl" is a playful bossa nova song where Laufey depicts herself as a lovestruck girl who struggles with being separated from her boyfriend. "Snow White" addresses impossible body standards for women and the pain of never feeling like you are enough.

== Release and promotion ==
Laufey announced her third studio album, A Matter of Time, on 15 May 2025, confirming its release for 22 August through Vingolf Recordings and AWAL. The announcement was shared through her official social media platforms, where she revealed the album's cover artwork along with its release date. In a post shared the day prior, she described it as a personal diary turned into song, exploring the full spectrum of emotions "from the beautiful to the ugly" experienced through life and love over time.

On 23 February 2026, Laufey announced A Matter of Time: The Final Hour, a deluxe edition of the album released on 10 April. She released a Warren Fu-directed music video for "Madwoman", featuring Alysa Liu, Hudson Williams, Lola Tung, and Megan Skiendiel, on 13 April. Several weeks before her Coachella performance, the video was filmed in Los Angeles.

=== Singles ===
Ahead of the announcement, Laufey released two singles: "Silver Lining" on 3 April 2025, and "Tough Luck" on 15 May. The latter had been previewed in live performances prior to its official release. Both were peaked at numbers 25 and 36 in her native country chart, respectively. She released two more singles from the album, "Lover Girl" (on 25 June) and "Snow White" (on 7 August). Laufey's twin sister Junia Lin directed a music video for the latter song, filmed in their native country Iceland. The former reached highest chart performance among the album's singles, peaking at number 11, while the latter charted at number 18. "How I Get" was released as a single for the album's deluxe edition on 25 February 2026; Laufey performed the song with the BBC Concert Orchestra on BBC Radio 2.

=== Tour ===
To promote the album, Laufey performed at various concerts and festivals across North and South America throughout 2025. These appearances included collaborations with several symphony orchestras. She performed in Mexico City on 27 May, followed by a set at the Popload Festival in São Paulo on 31 May. In late July and early August, Laufey joined the Virginia Symphony Orchestra for two performances at the Virginia Arts Festival in Norfolk, Virginia, on 30 and 31 July. She then appeared with the Chautauqua Symphony Orchestra in Chautauqua, New York, on 2 and 3 August. Further orchestral concerts included performances with The Cleveland Orchestra at the Blossom Music Center in Cuyahoga Falls, Ohio, on 7 August, and with The Philadelphia Orchestra at the Saratoga Performing Arts Center on 9 August. After these festivals and orchestral concerts, she embarked on the A Matter of Time Tour across North America, Europe, Asia, and Oceania.

== Critical reception ==
Professional ratings
Aggregate scores
Source	Rating
AnyDecentMusic?	8.2/10
Metacritic	84/100
Review scores
Source	Rating
Clash	8/10
The Independent	5/5 stars
The Line of Best Fit	9/10
NME	4/5 stars
Pitchfork	7.2/10
PopMatters	8/10
Rolling Stone	3.5/5 stars
The Skinny	5/5 stars
Uncut	8/10

According to the review aggregator Metacritic, A Matter of Time received "universal acclaim" based on a weighted average score of 84 out of 100 from 11 critic scores.

PopMatters described A Matter of Time as "charming", noting that Laufey's appeal comes through even when she downplays it.

=== Accolades ===
Awards for A Matter of Time
Organisation	Year	Category	Result	Ref.
Grammy Awards	2026	Best Traditional Pop Vocal Album	Won	
Icelandic Music Awards	2026	Pop Album of the Year	Won	

== Commercial performance ==
A Matter of Time debuted at number three on the UK Albums Chart dated 29 August 2025, earning Laufey her first top-ten album in the country after Bewitched peaked at number 13. The album also debuted atop the Official Record Store Chart, making A Matter of Time the most popular album in UK independent record stores in its week of release. The album debuted at number four on the US Billboard 200, including number one on the Independent Albums and Top Jazz Albums charts selling 99,000 album-equivalent units.

== Track listing ==
All tracks are written by Laufey and Spencer Stewart, except where noted.

A Matter of Time track listing
No.	Title	Writer(s)	Length
1.	"Clockwork"		2:30
2.	"Lover Girl"		2:44
3.	"Snow White"	Laufey	3:13
4.	"Castle in Hollywood"	Laufey	2:33
5.	"Carousel"		3:19
6.	"Silver Lining"		3:17
7.	"Too Little, Too Late"		3:53
8.	"Cuckoo Ballet" (Interlude)		3:39
9.	"Forget-Me-Not"	Laufey	4:06
10.	"Tough Luck"		3:12
11.	"A Cautionary Tale"	Laufey; Aaron Dessner	4:16
12.	"Mr. Eclectic"		2:35
13.	"Clean Air"		2:35
14.	"Sabotage"		3:34
Total length:			45:26

Standard edition bonus track
No.	Title	Writer(s)	Length
15.	"Seems like Old Times"	Carmen Lombardo; John Jacob Loeb	2:59
Total length:			48:25

A Matter of Time: The Final Hour bonus tracks
No.	Title	Writer(s)	Length
16.	"Madwoman"		3:59
17.	"How I Get"		3:39
18.	"I Wait, I Wait, I Wait"	Laufey	3:29
19.	"I'll Forget About You (In Time)"		4:12
Total length:			63:44

Japanese edition live bonus tracks
No.	Title	Writer(s)	Length
20.	"Silver Lining" (Live from Tokyo)		3:39
21.	"Snow White" (Live from Tokyo)	Laufey	4:35
Total length:			71:58

Notes

- The standard edition in Japan includes a voice note of "Clockwork" preceding "Seems like Old Times".

== Personnel ==
Credits were adapted from Tidal.

=== Musicians ===
- Laufey – lead vocals (all tracks), cello (tracks 1–4, 7, 8, 10–12, 14, 16, 17, 19), piano (5, 18), electric guitar (6)
- Spencer Stewart – double bass (1, 8), piano (2, 7, 12, 14, 17), acoustic guitar (3, 5, 10), electric bass guitar (6), drums (13), guitars (13), organ (16), percussion (19)
- Junia Lin – violin (1, 2, 5, 7, 10)
- Ryan Shaw – drums (1, 15)
- Ted Case – piano (1, 15)
- Katisse Buckingham – flute (2)
- Aaron Dessner – acoustic guitar (4, 11); drums, piano (11)
- JT Bates – drums (4)
- Jeremy Ylvisaker – electric guitar (4)
- Mark Levang – accordion (5, 6)
- Jordan Rose – drums (6, 7)
- Robert Schaer – trumpet (8, 14)
- Anthony Parnther – bassoon (8)
- Jonathan Sacdalan – clarinet (8)
- Sara Andon – flute (8)
- Adam Wolf – French horn (8)
- Marcia Dickstein – harp (8)
- Claire Brazeau – oboe (8)
- Dillon Macintyre – trombone (8)
- Michelle Shin – violin (8)
- Iain Farrington – arrangement (9)
- Bryndís Þórsdóttir – bassoon (9)
- Louisa Slosar – bassoon (9)
- Hjörtur Páll Eggertsson – cello (9)
- Hrafnkell Orri Egilsson – cello (9)
- Júlía Mogensen – cello (9)
- Margrét Árnadóttir – cello (9)
- Sigurgeir Agnarsson – cello (9)
- Urh Mrak – cello (9)
- Baldvin Ingvar Tryggvason – clarinet (9)
- Grímur Helgason – clarinet (9)
- Jacek Karwan – double bass (9)
- Richard Korn – double bass (9)
- T. C. Fitzgerald – double bass (9)
- Þórir Jóhannsson – double bass (9)
- Anna Winter – flute (9)
- Áshildur Haraldsdóttir – flute (9)
- Charlotte Rehm – French horn (9)
- Joseph Ognibene – French horn (9)
- Paul Pitzek – French horn (9)
- Stefán Jón Bernharðsson – French horn (9)
- Katie Buckley – harp (9)
- Julia Hantschel – oboe (9)
- Matthías Nardeau – oboe (9)
- Eggert Pálsson – percussion (9)
- Frank Aarnink – timpani (9)
- Eyjólfur Bjarni Alfreðsson – viola (9)
- Guðrún Hrund Harðardóttir – viola (9)
- Guðrún Þórarinsdóttir – viola (9)
- Herdis Anna Jónsdóttir – viola (9)
- Kathryn Harrison – viola (9)
- Þórunn Ósk Marinósdóttir – viola (9)
- Anton Miller – violin (9)
- Geirþrúður Anna Guðmundsdóttir – violin (9)
- Greta Guðnadóttir – violin (9)
- Helga Þóra Björgvinsdóttir – violin (9)
- Herdís Mjöll Guðmundsdóttir – violin (9)
- Hulda Jónsdóttir – violin (9)
- Ingrid Karlsdóttir – violin (9)
- Júlíana Elín Kjartansdóttir – violin (9)
- Kristján Matthíasson – violin (9)
- Margrét Kristjánsdóttir – violin (9)
- Margrét Þorsteinsdóttir – violin (9)
- Pálína Árnadóttir – violin (9)
- Pétur Björnsson – violin (9)
- Sigrún Eðvaldsdóttir – violin (9)
- Sigurlaug Eðvaldsdóttir – violin (9)
- Sólrún Ylfa Ingimarsdóttir – violin (9)
- Sólveig Vaka Eyþórsdóttir – violin (9)
- Ólöf Þorvarðsdóttir – violin (9)
- Andrew Barr – drums (11)
- Clairo – background vocals (12)
- Dario Bizio – double bass (14)
- Karl McComas-Reichl – double bass (15)
- Maverick MacMillan – drum kit (16)
- Cleon Edwards – drums (17)
- JD Beck – drums (17)
- Noah Foyerbringer – drums (17)

=== Technical ===
- Laufey – production
- Spencer Stewart – production (1–3, 5–8, 10, 12–15)
- Aaron Dessner – production (4, 11)
- Iceland Symphony Orchestra – production (9)
- Steve Kaye – mixing
- Joe LaPorta – mastering
- Jannick Frampton – additional mixing
- Bella Blasko – engineering (4, 11)
- Dani Perez – engineering (6, 12, 13)
- Sveinn Kjartansson – engineering (9)
- Jack Manning – engineering (12, 13)
- Carlos Ruiz – engineering assistance (6), additional engineering (12, 13)
- Zach Szydlo – immersive mixing
- F.R. David – tape operator (all tracks)

== Charts ==
=== Weekly charts ===
Weekly chart performance for A Matter of Time
Chart (2025–2026)	Peak position
Australian Albums (ARIA)	2
Australian Jazz & Blues Albums (ARIA)	1
Austrian Albums (Ö3 Austria)	8
Belgian Albums (Ultratop Flanders)	5
Belgian Albums (Ultratop Wallonia)	9
Canadian Albums (Billboard)	7
Croatian International Albums (HDU)	38
Danish Albums (Hitlisten)	32
Dutch Albums (Album Top 100)	2
Finnish Albums (Suomen virallinen lista)	42
French Albums (SNEP)	40
German Albums (Offizielle Top 100)	11
Hungarian Physical Albums (MAHASZ)	27
Icelandic Albums (Tónlistinn)	1
Irish Albums (Official Charts)	13
Irish Independent Albums (IRMA)	1
Italian Physical Albums (FIMI)	6
Japanese Albums (Oricon)	31
Japanese Download Albums (Billboard Japan)	49
New Zealand Albums (RMNZ)	3
Norwegian Physical Albums (IFPI Norge)	6
Polish Albums (ZPAV)	22
Portuguese Albums (AFP)	7
Scottish Albums (Official Charts)	4
Spanish Albums (Promusicae)	26
Swedish Albums (Sverigetopplistan)	28
Swiss Albums (Schweizer Hitparade)	20
UK Albums (Official Charts)	3
UK Independent Albums (Official Charts)	1
US Billboard 200	4
US Independent Albums (Billboard)	1
US Jazz Albums (Billboard)	1

=== Year-end charts ===
2025 year-end charts for A Matter of Time
Chart (2025)	Position
Australian Jazz & Blues Albums (ARIA)	1
Icelandic Albums (Tónlistinn)	15
US Independent Albums (Billboard)	45
US Jazz Albums (Billboard)	9

== Certifications and sales ==
Certifications and sales for A Matter of Time
Region	Certification	Certified units/sales
Iceland (FHF)	—	1,170
United Kingdom (BPI)	Silver	60,000^{‡}
^{‡} Sales+streaming figures based on certification alone.

== Release history ==
Release history for A Matter of Time
Region	Date	Format(s)	Edition	Label(s)	Ref.
Various	22 August 2025	Streaming; digital download	Explicit	Vingolf; AWAL	
Various	22 August 2025	Streaming; digital download	Clean	Vingolf; AWAL	
Various	22 August 2025	LP+7-inch; CD; cassette	Standard	Vingolf; AWAL	
Various	24 August 2025	Streaming; digital download	Standard	Vingolf; AWAL	
Japan	27 August 2025	Blu-spec	Standard	SMEJ	
Various	10 April 2026	Streaming; digital download	The Final Hour	Vingolf; AWAL	
Various	10 April 2026	2×LP; CD; cassette	The Final Hour	Vingolf; AWAL	
Various	10 April 2026	Streaming; digital download	Instrumental	Vingolf; AWAL	
Japan	27 May 2026	Blu-spec	Live bonus	SMEJ	
