= Sally, When the Wine Runs Out =

2025 single by Role Model

- Live from Vevo cover artwork

Single by Role Model

from the album Kansas Anymore (The Longest Goodbye)
- Released: February 14, 2025
- Genre: Indie pop; folk pop
- Length: 3:38
- Label: Interscope
- Songwriters: Tucker Pillsbury; Noah Conrad; Annika Bennett; Harrison Whitford
- Producers: Conrad; Whitford

Role Model singles chronology
"Somebody Else" (2024)	"Sally, When the Wine Runs Out" (2025)	"The Longest Goodbye" (2025)

Music video
- "Sally, When the Wine Runs Out" on YouTube

"Sally, When the Wine Runs Out" is a song by American singer-songwriter Role Model, from Kansas Anymore (The Longest Goodbye), the deluxe edition of his second studio album, Kansas Anymore (2024). It was produced by Noah Conrad and Harrison Whitford. The song went viral from videos of Role Model performing it with celebrities and became his breakout single. It was released as a single on February 14, 2025.

== Background ==
Role Model stated the song is "based off some truth" and "Lyrically, it was me being hesitant and doubtful. Not being sold on someone." In an interview with Travis Mills, he said:

That was very much about a new experience and trying to dive headfirst back into the dating pool. I just wanted a fun song and at the time I was in a pretty good spot mentally and I was like, "I'm gonna take advantage of this, so let's try and make a song that's not so much of a downer for anyone."

== Composition ==
"Sally, When the Wine Runs Out" is an indie pop and pop rock song that draws influences from 1970s pop. It is composed of acoustic and "twangy" electric guitars, a "bumping" bass line and simple drum beat. Lyrically, the narrator recalls meeting a woman named Sally at a dive bar and spending the night with her. He describes that she drinks so much and has an unpredictable character. The protagonist begs her not to fall in love with him at the moment but lose such feelings when she is sober, though he offers to buy her a couple more drinks. He opens up to her and tries to form a relationship. Although she does not seem to return his feelings, his attraction toward her remains unwavering.

== Live performances ==
Before embarking on his No Place Like Tour, Role Model knew that influencer Jake Shane would be in Dallas, Texas at the time of his concert at the House of Blues on February 27, 2025. He invited Shane to attend as a guest and brought him onstage during his performance of "Sally, When the Wine Runs Out". Fans loved it, and a rumor soon circulated on social media alleging that Shane was the "Sally" in question.

Leaning into their reactions, Role Model developed a concert tradition for "Sally, When the Wine Runs Out". Before performing the bridge, he would ask "Where's my Sally tonight?" and welcome a guest onstage to perform the rest of the song. Notable guests who appeared as "Sally" include:

- Ashe
- Benee (at Laneway Festival)
- Charli XCX (during Saturday Night Live)
- Lewis Capaldi
- Charlotte Cardin
- Lucy Dacus (at Laneway Festival)
- Hilary Duff (at the Austin City Limits Music Festival)
- Conan Gray (at the Governors Ball Music Festival)
- Griff
- Niall Horan
- Kate Hudson
- Robert Irwin (at Laneway Festival)
- Lizzy McAlpine
- Dylan Minnette of Wallows
- Susan Pillsbury, Role Model's mother
- Natalie Portman
- Reneé Rapp
- Olivia Rodrigo (at Lollapalooza)
- Al Roker (during Today)
- Troye Sivan (at Outside Lands)
- The Dare
- The Wiggles (at Laneway Festival)
- Rhian Teasdale of Wet Leg (at Laneway Festival)
- Malcolm Todd (at Laneway Festival)
- Bowen Yang (during The Tonight Show Starring Jimmy Fallon)
- María Zardoya of The Marías (at Hinterland Music Festival)

== Charts ==
=== Weekly charts ===
Weekly chart performance for "Sally, When the Wine Runs Out"
Chart (2025–2026)	Peak position
Australia (ARIA)	45
Canada (Canadian Hot 100)	59
Canada Hot AC (Billboard)	38
Canada Mainstream Rock (Billboard Canada)	22
Canada Modern Rock (Billboard Canada)	1
Estonia Airplay (TopHit)	71
Ireland (IRMA)	50
Israel International Airplay (Media Forest)	8
Lithuania Airplay (TopHit)	54
New Zealand Hot Singles (RMNZ)	10
UK Singles (Official Charts)	57
US Bubbling Under Hot 100 (Billboard)	2
US Adult Pop Airplay (Billboard)	31
US Hot Rock & Alternative Songs (Billboard)	14
US Pop Airplay (Billboard)	25
US Rock & Alternative Airplay (Billboard)	4

=== Monthly charts ===
Monthly chart performance for "Sally, When the Wine Runs Out"
Chart (2025–2026)	Peak position
Estonia Airplay (TopHit)	92
Lithuania Airplay (TopHit)	57

=== Year-end charts ===
Year-end chart performance for "Sally, When the Wine Runs Out"
Chart (2025)	Position
Canada Mainstream Rock (Billboard)	63
Canada Modern Rock (Billboard)	15
US Hot Rock & Alternative Songs (Billboard)	16
US Rock & Alternative Airplay (Billboard)	21

== Certifications ==
Certifications for "Sally, When the Wine Runs Out"
Region	Certification	Certified units/sales
Australia (ARIA)	Platinum	70,000^{‡}
Canada (Music Canada)	Platinum	80,000^{‡}
New Zealand (RMNZ)	Platinum	30,000^{‡}
United Kingdom (BPI)	Gold	400,000^{‡}
United States (RIAA)	Gold	500,000^{‡}
^{‡} Sales+streaming figures based on certification alone.
