= Kansas Anymore =

Studio album by Role Model
- Released: July 19, 2024
- Genres: Americana; country; indie pop; pop rock
- Length: 41:29
- Labels: Interscope; Polydor
- Producers: Noah Conrad; Brandon Shoop; Jonah Shy; Scott Harris; Ian Fitchuk; Todd Lombardo; Ross MacDonald; Ryan Linvill; Jason Vance Harris; Matthew Neighbour

Role Model chronology
Rx (2022)	Kansas Anymore (2024)	Chuck Timely & the Hourglass (2026)

Singles from Kansas Anymore
- 1. "Oh, Gemini" Released: March 22, 2024; 2. "Deeply Still in Love" Released: May 10, 2024; 3. "Look at That Woman" Released: June 21, 2024; 4. "Scumbag" Released: July 19, 2024

Singles from Kansas Anymore (The Longest Goodbye)
- 1. "Sally, When the Wine Runs Out" Released: February 14, 2025; 2. "The Longest Goodbye" Released: July 9, 2025

Kansas Anymore is the second studio album by American singer-songwriter Role Model, released on July 19, 2024, by Interscope and Polydor Records. Executive produced by Noah Conrad, the album explores indie-folk and country influences, departing from the alt-pop style of 2022's Rx. The album features a guest appearance from Lizzy McAlpine on the track "So Far Gone". Its title is a reference to a scene from the 1939 film The Wizard of Oz – wherein, after arriving in Oz, Dorothy Gale (played by Judy Garland) remarks to her dog Toto: "I have a feeling we're not in Kansas anymore."

Kansas Anymore was preceded by the release of four singles—"Oh, Gemini", "Deeply Still in Love", "Look at That Woman" and "Scumbag". A deluxe edition, sub-titled The Longest Goodbye, was released on February 14, 2025. The reissue features four new songs, including the single "Sally, When the Wine Runs Out", a country-inspired track that went viral on social media, and Role Model's first to reach the Billboard charts. An acoustic version of "The Longest Goodbye" featuring Icelandic singer-songwriter Laufey served as the 6th single, released on July 9, 2025.

To support the album, Role Model accompanied Gracie Abrams on the Secret of Us Tour (2024–2025) as an opener at select stops, before embarking on the No Place Like Tour in 2025.

== Critical reception ==
Professional ratings
Review scores
Source	Rating
ACRN	8/10
AllMusic	3.5/5 stars
DIY	4/5 stars
Dork	4/5
Pitchfork	5.8/10

Pitchfork's critic Brady Brickner-Wood labeled Kansas Anymore as a "step in the right direction" for Role Model, with the album's personality and songcraft being more mature and palatable than any of his past work. He further stated that the album seems "less concerned with landing a hit than it does building a sturdy home to hang out in." Kate Tocke of ACRN called the Kansas Anymore (The Longest Goodbye) tracks a nearly-perfect add-on to an already great album that gives fans "more to wonder about and depth about his storytelling heartbreak."

== Commercial performance ==
Kansas Anymore peaked at number ten on the Billboard Top Alternative Albums chart, and has earned 282,000 equivalent album units, as of September 2025.

== Track listing ==
Kansas Anymore track listing
No.	Title	Writer(s)	Producer(s)	Length
1.	"Writing's on the Wall"	Tucker Pillsbury; Brandon Shoop; Levi Roth; Noah Conrad	Shoop; Conrad	2:49
2.	"Look at That Woman"	Pillsbury; Annika Bennett; Jonah Shy; Conrad	Conrad	2:43
3.	"Scumbag"	Pillsbury; Ian Fitchuk; Todd Lombardo	Shy; Conrad; Scott Harris	3:03
4.	"Oh, Gemini"	Pillsbury; Fitchuk; Lombardo	Fitchuk; Lombardo	2:44
5.	"Frances"	Pillsbury; Conrad; Ross MacDonald	Conrad; MacDonald	3:52
6.	"Superglue"	Pillsbury; Shy; Conrad; Harris	Conrad	3:20
7.	"The Dinner"	Pillsbury; Gabe Goodman; Nicholas Carpenter; Conrad; Ryan Linvill	Conrad; Linvill	3:08
8.	"Deeply Still in Love"	Pillsbury; Ben Ash; Conrad	Conrad	4:02
9.	"Slut Era Interlude"	Pillsbury; Jason Vance Harris	Vance Harris; Conrad	2:06
10.	"So Far Gone" (featuring Lizzy McAlpine)	Pillsbury; Lizzy McAlpine; Conrad	Conrad	3:16
11.	"Slipfast"	Pillsbury; Bennett; Shy	Matthew Neighbour; Conrad	3:12
12.	"Compromise"	Pillsbury; Shy; Conrad; Harris	Conrad	3:33
13.	"Something, Somehow, Someday"	Pillsbury	Conrad	3:35
Total length:				41:29

Kansas Anymore (The Longest Goodbye) track listing
No.	Title	Writer(s)	Producer(s)	Length
14.	"Old Recliners"	Pillsbury; Conrad; Harrison Whitford	Conrad	3:41
15.	"Sally, When the Wine Runs Out"	Pillsbury; Bennett; Whitford; Conrad	Whitford; Conrad	3:38
16.	"Some Protector"	Pillsbury; Conrad	Conrad	3:37
17.	"The Longest Goodbye"	Pillsbury; Conrad; Mason Stoops	Conrad; Stoops	2:43
Total length:				55:10

== Charts ==
=== Weekly charts ===
Chart performance for Kansas Anymore
Chart (2025–2026)	Peak position
Australian Albums (ARIA)	17
Belgian Albums (Ultratop Flanders)	66
Dutch Albums (Album Top 100)	76
Irish Albums (Official Charts)	47
Scottish Albums (Official Charts)	8
UK Albums (Official Charts)	92
UK Americana Albums (Official Charts)	1
US Billboard 200	82

Chart performance for Kansas Anymore (The Longest Goodbye)
Chart (2025–2026)	Peak position
New Zealand Albums (RMNZ)	20

=== Year-end charts ===
Year-end chart performance for Kansas Anymore (The Longest Goodbye)
Chart (2025)	Position
New Zealand Albums (RMNZ)	49

== Certifications ==
Region	Certification	Certified units/sales
New Zealand (RMNZ) Deluxe edition	Gold	7,500^{‡}
United Kingdom (BPI)	Silver	60,000^{‡}
^{‡} Sales+streaming figures based on certification alone.
