= Role Model (singer) =

American musician (born 1997)

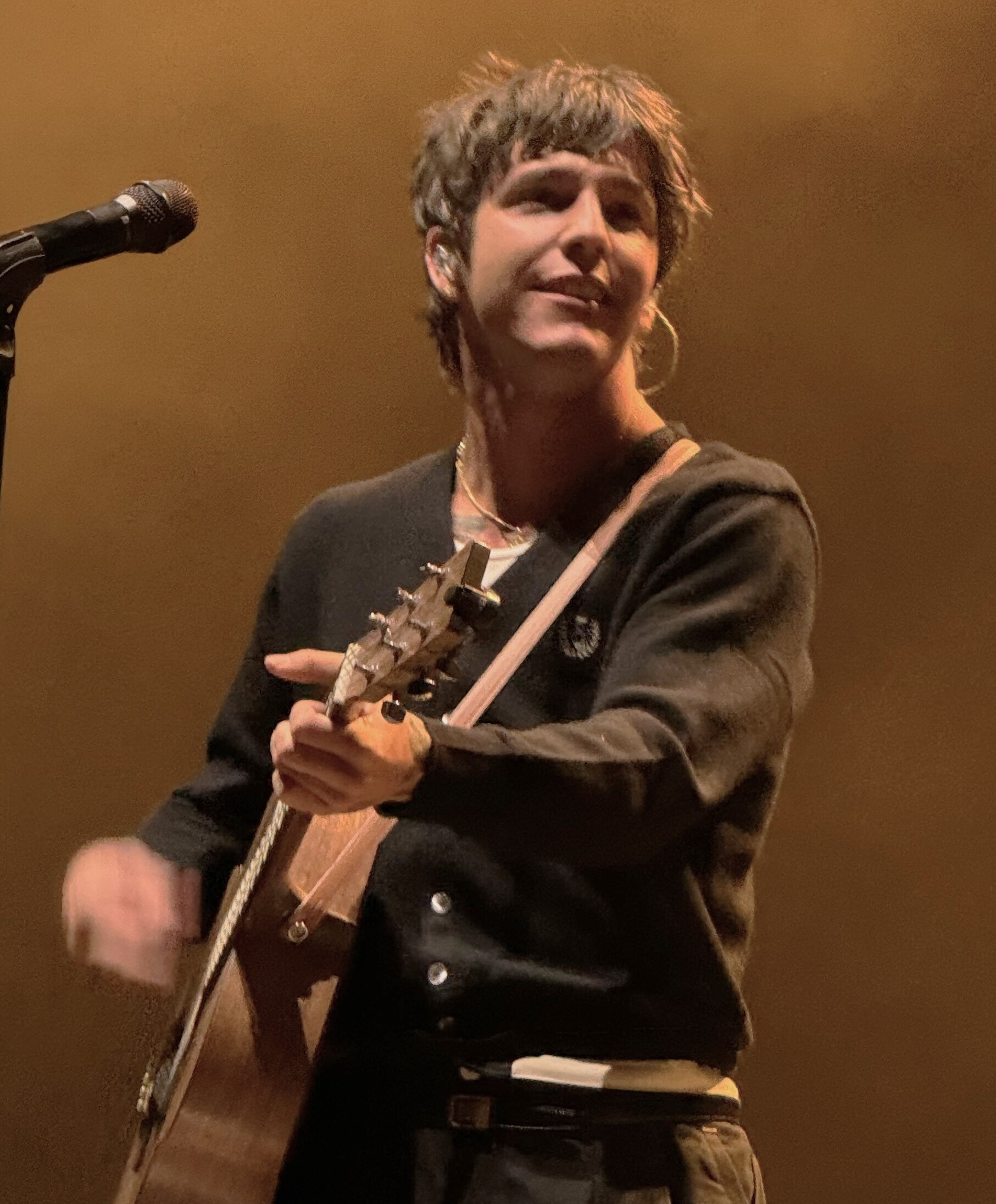
- Pillsbury in 2024

Background information
- Also known as: Dillis; Tucker; saintlaurentcowboy; Chuck Timely
- Born: Tucker Harrington Pillsbury; May 15, 1997 (age 29); Cape Elizabeth, Maine, U.S.
- Origin: Los Angeles, California, U.S.
- Genres: Indie pop; Americana; Country
- Occupations: Singer; songwriter; musician; rapper
- Instruments: Vocals; guitar
- Years active: 2017–present
- Labels: Interscope; Polydor
- Website: heyrolemodel.com

Signature
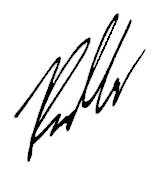

Tucker Harrington Pillsbury (born May 15, 1997), better known by his stage name Role Model (stylized in all caps), is an American singer-songwriter. After self-releasing his debut EP, Arizona in the Summer, in 2017, he earned a following online and was signed to Interscope Records in 2018. He later released two EPs—Oh, How Perfect (2019) and Our Little Angel (2020)—through Interscope and Polydor. His first full-length album, Rx, came out in 2022. His second album, Kansas Anymore, was published in 2024, with a third, Chuck Timely & the Hourglass, being released in 2026.

== Early life ==
Tucker Harrington Pillsbury was born on May 15, 1997 in Cape Elizabeth, Maine. His father, Rusty, is a real estate appraiser, and his mother, Susan Pillsbury, is a retired special education teacher in Cape Elizabeth. As a child, he was heavily inspired by Elvis Presley, and would perform for his family while dressed as Elvis.

Throughout high school, Pillsbury took an interest in film, and in 2014, he moved to Pittsburgh to major in film studies at Point Park University. During his freshman year, he broke his wrist in a skiing accident at Sugarloaf Mountain, and later broke his wrist again due to a skateboarding accident. While he was stuck in his dorm, two of his friends left music equipment there, prompting him to record several rap mixtapes while learning how to use Logic Pro. He soon dropped out of Point Park University after his grades started to fall.

== Career ==
Pillsbury began rapping in 2016 under the mononym Tucker, and released his debut mixtape, Since When. He soon changed his stage name to Dillis, and self-released his debut album, Moth, in June 2016. That same month, he performed at a show at the Maine State Pier, and he later performed as an opener for Jordan Capozzi during her 2016 U.S. tour.

In early 2017, Pillsbury changed his stage name to Role Model and switched from rapping to singing. He self-released his debut extended play, Arizona in the Summer, in December 2017 after recording it in his closet, which earned him a following online. After hearing the EP, rapper Mac Miller invited him to Los Angeles for the two to work together. He was signed to Interscope in 2018. A music video for his song "Play the Part" was released in November 2018. His single "Minimal" was released in May 2019 along with a music video. He was featured on the song "Fucked Up, Kinda" from Julia Michaels's EP, Inner Monologue Part 2, released in June 2019. He released the music video for his single "Hello!" in October 2019. In November 2019, he released his second EP, Oh, How Perfect, in November 2019 through Interscope Records and Polydor Records. His first headlining tour, the Far from Perfect Tour, took place throughout late 2019.

In February 2020, he released an acoustic version of his song "Notice Me". He released his third EP, Our Little Angel, on October 21, 2020, through Polydor Records. A music video for his song "Blind" was released in October 2020. In July 2021, he released the single "Forever&more", and in September 2021, he released the single "Death Wish". On February 18, 2022, he released the single "If Jesus Saves, She's My Type" alongside its music video. The same day, Role Model also announced the title, the tracklist, and the official release date of his debut album. In March 2022, he released the album's third single "Neverletyougo" with a music video. His debut album, Rx, was released on April 8, 2022. The music video for "Rx", the title track, was released on April 8, 2022.

On February 17, 2023, he released the single "A Little More Time" alongside an official music video co-directed by himself and Emma Chamberlain.

He released his second album, Kansas Anymore, in July 2024. He then released a deluxe edition of the album, Kansas Anymore (The Longest Goodbye), in February 2025, alongside the upbeat country-inspired single, "Sally, When the Wine Runs Out", which gained some popularity on TikTok after he teased the song pre-release. The album, overall, received positive reviews from audience and critics alike, with ACRN Media praising Pillsbury for his growth and transition into a pop-folk sound.

Beginning in September 2024, he performed as an opening act for the US leg of Gracie Abrams' world tour for her second album, The Secret of Us, concluding in October 2024.

On December 9, 2024, Role Model was announced to be the opener for Gracie Abrams' The Secret of Us Deluxe Tour commencing in July 2025.

On May 19, 2025, it was announced that Role Model will star in Netflix's and Lena Dunham's rom-com Good Sex, starring Natalie Portman and Mark Ruffalo, coming out in 2027, marking his first on-screen acting role. However, it was later announced that the filming for the movie would clash with his The Secret of Us Deluxe Tour dates, notifying that he would only play four dates out of the eleven initially announced.

Pillsbury performing live at the Minneapolis Armory, September 2026

On October 11, 2025, Role Model was the musical guest on an episode of Saturday Night Live where he performed "Sally, When the Wine Runs Out", in which Charli XCX made a surprise cameo during the performance. He also performed "Some Protector", off of the deluxe version of his album Kansas Anymore.

On December 6, 2025, he was honored at the ninth annual Variety Hitmakers Awards, where he was awarded Triple Threat of the Year.

On January 2, 2026, he performed at the 2026 NHL Winter Classic. In Fall 2026, he will tour North America in support of his latest album, Chuck Timely & the Hourglass.

== Artistry ==
Pillsbury allegedly took his name from Paul Rudd's character in the 2008 film Role Models. However, during a June 2022 interview with Zach Sang, he confirmed this was a joke, and that this is not the reason for his stage name. He often plays acoustic guitar on his songs, and his music has been described as pop and bedroom pop. He has called Mac Miller an inspiration of his due to his influence on the city of Pittsburgh, and called meeting him "the most pivotal moment in my life". Critics have described his lyrics, which discuss topics such as sex, mental health, and relationships, as "relatable" and "confessional".

== Personal life ==
Pillsbury was diagnosed with type 1 diabetes when he was ten years old. He has also been open about mental health issues and depression. As of 2019, he is based in Hollywood.

He was in a relationship with social media personality and model Emma Chamberlain. Their break-up was announced in October 2023. From 2025 to 2026, Pillsbury was in a relationship with actress Dakota Johnson.

== Discography ==
=== Studio albums ===
List of studio albums, with details and chart positions
Title	Details	Peak chart positions					
Title	Details	US	AUS	CAN	IRE	NZ	UK
Rx	Released: April 8, 2022; Label: Interscope, Polydor; Format: Digital download, streaming, 12″ vinyl, CD	— (Note: RX did not enter the US Billboard 200 but peaked at number 11 on the US Heatseekers Albums chart.)	—	—	—	—	—
Kansas Anymore	Released: July 19, 2024; Label: Interscope, Polydor; Format: Digital download, streaming, 12″ vinyl, CD	82	17	—	47	—	92
Chuck Timely & the Hourglass	Released: August 7, 2026; Label: Interscope, Polydor; Format: Digital download, streaming, 12″ vinyl, CD	10	4	19	19	9	6
"—" denotes a release that did not register on that chart.

==== Reissues ====
List of reissues, with details and chart positions
Title	Details	Peak chart positions
Title	Details	NZ
Kansas Anymore (The Longest Goodbye)	Released: February 14, 2025; Label: Interscope, Polydor; Format: Digital download, streaming, 12" vinyl, CD	20

=== Extended plays ===
List of extended plays, with details
Title	Details
Arizona in the Summer	Released: January 30, 2017; Label: Self-released; Formats: Digital download, streaming
Oh, How Perfect	Released: November 13, 2019; Label: Interscope, Polydor; Formats: Digital download, streaming
Our Little Angel	Released: October 21, 2020; Label: Interscope, Polydor; Formats: 12″ vinyl, digital download, streaming

=== Singles ===
List of singles, with title, year, chart positions, and album
Title	Year	Peak chart positions										Certifications	Album
Title	Year	US	US AAA	US Alt.	US Pop	US Rock	AUS	CAN	IRE	NZ Hot	UK	Certifications	Album
"Cocaine Babe"	2017	—	—	—	—	—	—	—	—	—	—		Non-album singles
"Puerto Rican" (featuring Patches)	2017	—	—	—	—	—	—	—	—	—	—		Non-album singles
"Girl in New York"	2017	—	—	—	—	—	—	—	—	—	—		Non-album singles
"I Don't Rly Like U"	2017	—	—	—	—	—	—	—	—	—	—		Arizona in the Summer
"Not a Fan"	2018	—	—	—	—	—	—	—	—	—	—		Non-album singles
"Stolen Car"	2018	—	—	—	—	—	—	—	—	—	—		Non-album singles
"Play the Part"	2018	—	—	—	—	—	—	—	—	—	—		Non-album singles
"Six Speed"	2018	—	—	—	—	—	—	—	—	—	—		Non-album singles
"The Climb"	2019	—	—	—	—	—	—	—	—	—	—		Non-album singles
"Minimal"	2019	—	—	—	—	—	—	—	—	—	—		Non-album singles
"Hello!"	2019	—	—	—	—	—	—	—	—	—	—		Oh, How Perfect
"Notice Me" (acoustic)	2020	—	—	—	—	—	—	—	—	—	—		Non-album single
"For the People in the Back"	2020	—	—	—	—	—	—	—	—	—	—		Our Little Angel
"Blind"	2020	—	—	—	—	—	—	—	—	—	—		Our Little Angel
"Forever&More"	2021	—	—	—	—	—	—	—	—	—	—		Rx
"Death Wish"	2021	—	—	—	—	—	—	—	—	—	—		Non-album single
"If Jesus Saves, She's My Type"	2022	—	—	—	—	—	—	—	—	—	—		Rx
"Neverletyougo"	2022	—	—	—	—	—	—	—	—	—	—		Rx
"Rx"	2022	—	—	—	—	—	—	—	—	—	—		Rx
"Cross Your Mind"	2022	—	—	—	—	—	—	—	—	—	—		Non-album singles
"A Little More Time"	2023	—	—	—	—	—	—	—	—	—	—		Non-album singles
"Oh, Gemini"	2024	—	—	—	—	—	—	—	—	—	—		Kansas Anymore
"Deeply Still in Love"	2024	—	—	—	—	—	—	—	—	31	—		Kansas Anymore
"Look at That Woman"	2024	—	—	—	—	—	—	—	—	—	—	RMNZ: Gold	Kansas Anymore
"Scumbag"	2024	—	—	—	—	—	—	—	—	—	—		Kansas Anymore
"Sally, When the Wine Runs Out"	2025	— (Note: "Sally, When the Wine Runs Out" did not enter the Billboard Hot 100, but peaked at number 2 on the Bubbling Under Hot 100 chart.)	1	3	25	14	45	59	50	10	57	RIAA: Gold; ARIA: Platinum; BPI: Gold; MC: Platinum; RMNZ: Platinum	Kansas Anymore (The Longest Goodbye)
"The Longest Goodbye" (solo or featuring Laufey)	2025	—	—	—	—	—	—	—	—	30	—		Kansas Anymore (The Longest Goodbye)
"Saddle Again"	2025	—	—	—	—	—	—	—	—	—	—		Nobody Wants This
"High Hopes 3000"	2026	95	—	—	—	19	89	—	64	6	83		Chuck Timely & the Hourglass
"Joy"	2026	—	—	—	—	50	—	—	—	1	—		Chuck Timely & the Hourglass
"—" denotes a release that did not register on that chart.

=== Other charted songs ===
List of other charted songs, with title, year, chart positions, and album
Title	Year	Peak chart positions					Album
Title	Year	US Rock	IRE	NZ Hot	RUS Stream.	UK	Album
"Afterglow"	2018	—	—	—	59	—	Non-album song
"Writing's on the Wall"	2024	25	40	—	*	98	Kansas Anymore
"Old Recliners"	2025	—	—	37	*	—	Kansas Anymore (The Longest Goodbye)
"Some Protector"	2025	—	—	35	*	—	Kansas Anymore (The Longest Goodbye)
"Song Is All You Get"	2026	—	—	13	—	—	Chuck Timely & the Hourglass
"Love I You"	2026	45	89	8	—	—	Chuck Timely & the Hourglass
"Chasing Midnight"	2026	—	—	12	—	—	Chuck Timely & the Hourglass
"Harmony"	2026	44	—	6	—	—	Chuck Timely & the Hourglass
"—" denotes a recording that did not chart or was not released in that territory. "*" denotes that the chart did not exist at that time.

== Tours ==
- TOURx (2022)
- No Place Like Tour (2024–2025)
- Chuck On Tour (2026–2027)

Supporting

- Malibu Nights World Tour (2019)
- The Secret of Us Tour (2024–2025)
