= Chuck Timely & the Hourglass =

Studio album by Role Model
- Released: August 7, 2026
- Studios: Pink Noise (Los Angeles); Frogtown (Los Angeles); Tomarind (Los Angeles); Animal Rites (Los Angeles)
- Genres: Indie pop; Americana
- Length: 47:31
- Label: Interscope
- Producers: Taylor Mackall; Kane Ritchotte; Mason Stoops

Role Model chronology
Kansas Anymore (2024)	Chuck Timely & the Hourglass (2026)

Singles from Chuck Timely & the Hourglass
- 1. "High Hopes 3000" Released: June 3, 2026; 2. "Joy" Released: July 10, 2026

Chuck Timely & the Hourglass is the third studio album by American singer and songwriter Role Model. It was released on August 7, 2026, through Interscope.

== Background ==
Role Model began working on Chuck Timely & the Hourglass in early 2025. The name comes from an original alias he considered. In an interview, he detailed his relationship with American actress Dakota Johnson and how she is featured on "Love I You".

Role Model announced the album on May 28, 2026, with the release date set for August 7, 2026. The lead single "High Hopes 3000" was released on June 3, 2026. The second single "Joy" was released on July 10, 2026.

On June 18, 2026, Role Model announced the Chuck on Tour dates for the tour to support the album. He will be supported by Samia and Keni Titus throughout the tour. On July 8, he announced he would be performing a show on the albums release day at Thompson's Point in his homestate of Maine to kickoff the tour. On July 30, 2026, he performed at Thalia Hall as part of a Lollapalooza after show under the name Chuck Timely.

== Critical reception ==
Professional ratings
Aggregate scores
Source	Rating
Any Decent Music	5.9/10
Metacritic	68/100
Review scores
Source	Rating
Financial Times	4/5 stars
The Irish Times	3/5 stars
NME	3/5 stars
Paste	B−
Pitchfork	6.1/10

Any Decent Music gave the album a weighted average score of 5.9 out of 10 from five critic scores. According to Metacritic, it received "generally favorable" reviews based on a weighted average score of 68 out of 100 from seven critic scores.

Jordan Bassett of NME called the album Role Model's "most likeable album yet".

== Commercial performance ==
According to data reported by Hits, the album earned 39,858 album-equivalent units in its first week in the United States, comprising 24,962 album sales, 96 track-equivalent albums, and 14,800 streaming-equivalent albums.

== Track listing ==
Chuck Timely & the Hourglass track listing
No.	Title	Writer(s)	Producer(s)	Length
1.	"Chuck's Mantra"	Tucker Pillsbury; Mason Stoops; Taylor Mackall	Stoops; Mackall	1:31
2.	"High Hopes 3000"	Pillsbury; Stoops; Mackall; Remy Morritt; Kane Ritchotte; Harrison Whitford	Stoops; Mackall; Ritchotte	4:05
3.	"Song Is All You Get"	Pillsbury; Stoops; Mackall	Stoops; Mackall	4:08
4.	"Love I You"	Pillsbury; Stoops; Mackall	Stoops; Mackall	4:22
5.	"Chasing Midnight"	Pillsbury; Stoops; Mackall; Morritt; Whitford	Stoops; Mackall	4:35
6.	"Good Thing"	Pillsbury; Stoops; Mackall; Morritt	Stoops; Mackall	4:20
7.	"Joy"	Pillsbury; Stoops; Ritchotte	Stoops; Ritchotte; Mackall^{[a]}	3:34
8.	"Service Receipt"	Pillsbury; Stoops; Mackall; Morritt	Stoops; Mackall	4:32
9.	"Honeydew"	Pillsbury; Stoops; Mackall; Morritt; Whitford	Stoops; Mackall	4:11
10.	"Stain"	Pillsbury; Stoops; Mackall	Stoops; Mackall; Ritchotte	3:16
11.	"The Wedding"	Pillsbury; Stoops; Mackall; Morritt; Whitford	Stoops; Mackall	4:36
12.	"Harmony"	Pillsbury; Stoops; Mackall; Morritt	Stoops; Mackall	4:21
Total length:				47:31

=== Note ===
- ^{^[a]} indicates an additional producer.
- "Love I You" features an uncredited spoken word bridge by Dakota Johnson.

== Personnel ==
These credits are adapted from the album's liner notes.

=== Musicians ===
- Tucker Pillsbury – vocals (all tracks), percussion (tracks 2, 4), claps (3, 12), whistling (4), talk box (7), bongos (10)
- Mason Stoops – acoustic guitar (1–4, 7–12), electric guitar (2–12), background vocals (2–5, 7, 9, 11, 12), 12-string guitar (2, 3, 6–9, 12), Bellzouki (2, 3, 6, 11), boots (2), octave guitar (3, 7, 8, 12), claps (3, 7, 12), banjo (4, 5, 8), percussion (4), electric sitar (5, 7, 8, 10), Bass VI (6, 11, 12), glockenspiel (6), toy piano (7), bass guitar (9), slide guitar (10), bass harmonica (11)
- Taylor Mackall – organ (1–3, 7–12) , piano (2–9, 11, 12), background vocals (2, 4, 5, 7, 9, 11, 12), hand boots (2), CP-70 electric piano (3, 7, 10, 12), Wurlitzer electric piano (4, 10); Clavinet, percussion (4); acoustic guitar (5), combo organ (6), claps (7, 12), pump organ (11)
- Bella Porter – background vocals (1–10, 12), claps (12)
- Georgia Greene – background vocals (1–10, 12), claps (12)
- Vanessa Wheeler – background vocals (1, 2, 4, 5, 7, 9, 11, 12), percussion (4), acoustic guitar (7), claps (12)
- Evangeline Barrosse – background vocals (1, 2, 4, 10, 12), percussion (4)
- Sora Lopez – cello (1, 6, 9–12)
- Daniel Chae – violin (1, 6, 9–12)
- Logan Hone – flute (1, 6, 10)
- Omar Akrouche – background vocals (2–5, 7, 9, 12), percussion (2), bass guitar (3, 4), drum machine (3), claps (3, 12)
- Kane Ritchotte – electric guitar (2, 7); shaker, boots (2); claps (3, 7, 12), snare drum (3); drums, percussion, bass guitar (7, 8, 10); background vocals (7, 9, 10, 12), timpani (8)
- Remy Morritt – drums (2, 5, 6, 11), background vocals (2, 5, 9, 11), percussion (2, 11); tambourine, acoustic guitar (5); congas (12)
- Harrison Whitford – background vocals (2, 5, 9, 11), acoustic guitar (5, 6, 9, 11), electric guitar (5), slide guitar (6)
- Gabe Noel – bass guitar (2, 6, 11)
- Sam Gazarian – percussion (2), claps (7)
- David Timely – melodica (2)
- Sam KS – percussion (3–5, 8, 9, 12), drums (3, 4, 9, 12), claps (3), background vocals (4), cymbals (6)
- Madeleine Mayi – percussion, background vocals (4)
- Sydney Ross Mitchell – percussion, background vocals (4)
- Amelia Keesler – percussion, background vocals (4)
- Brooks Daughtrey – percussion, background vocals (4)
- Jade Steg – percussion, background vocals (4)
- Kaveh Rastegar – upright bass (5)
- Emiko Rochelle – violin (6, 9, 11)
- Karoline Menezes – viola (6, 9, 11)
- Sam Wilkes – bass guitar, fretless bass (12)

=== Technical and creative ===
- Omar Akrouche – engineering
- Vanessa Wheeler – second engineering
- Mark "Spike" Stent – mixing
- Kieran Scott – mixing assistance
- Ruairi O'Flaherty – mastering
- Jay Franco – mastering assistance
- Sam Gazarian – engineering (7), second engineering (2)
- Rachel White – second engineering (3)
- Imogene Strauss – creative direction
- Zola Anderson – creative assistance
- Randi Cass – digital creative direction
- Kaile Morgan – digital assistance
- Chloe Chippendale – photography
- Regrets Only – design

== Charts ==
Chart performance for Chuck Timely & the Hourglass
Chart (2026)	Peak position
Australian Albums (ARIA)	4
Austrian Albums (Ö3 Austria)	36
Belgian Albums (Ultratop Flanders)	10
Belgian Albums (Ultratop Wallonia)	45
Canadian Albums (Billboard)	19
Danish Vinyl Albums (Hitlisten)	15
Dutch Albums (Album Top 100)	12
German Albums (Offizielle Top 100)	17
German Pop Albums (Offizielle Top 100)	7
Irish Albums (Official Charts)	19
New Zealand Albums (RMNZ)	9
Portuguese Albums (AFP)	116
Scottish Albums (Official Charts)	3
UK Albums (Official Charts)	6
UK Americana Albums (Official Charts)	1
US Billboard 200	10
US Top Rock & Alternative Albums (Billboard)	3
