= Lover Girl (Laufey song) =

2025 single by Laufey

Single by Laufey

from the album A Matter of Time
- Released: 25 June 2025
- Genre: Bossa nova
- Length: 2:44
- Label: Vingolf; AWAL
- Songwriters: Laufey; Spencer Stewart
- Producers: Laufey; Spencer Stewart

Laufey singles chronology
"Tough Luck" (2025)	"Lover Girl" (2025)	"The Longest Goodbye" (2025)

Music video
- "Lover Girl" on YouTube

"Lover Girl" is a song by Icelandic singer-songwriter Laufey, released on 25 June 2025 as the third single from her third studio album, A Matter of Time (2025). It was written and produced by Laufey herself and Spencer Stewart.

== Background ==
Laufey wrote the song in Tokyo during her Bewitched Tour and recorded it in Los Angeles. On 27 May 2025, she debuted the song live during her concert at the Teatro Metropólitan in Mexico City, after revealing the inspiration for the song:

So, I wrote this song when I was on tour, and last year, I was in Tokyo, and I was missing a certain someone, and I was like, "Oh my God, I have become the person that I made fun of for years". You know, like a simp. And so I thought, you know, it's funny because I've always been known as the "never going to fall in love" girl. And now I've become the lover girl.

== Composition ==
"Lover Girl" is a bossa nova song, with a playful atmosphere, offbeat tempo and handclaps. Lyrically, Laufey depicts herself as a love-struck girl who struggles with being separated from her boyfriend. Strings alternate between increasing and decreasing volume during the chorus, in which Laufey describes she is in a "reckless fever". She notes that she would usually tease her lovesick friends for being overly dependent on their significant others but never expected to find herself in the same situation, before calling it a "curse to be a lover girl".

== Critical reception ==
The song received generally positive reviews. Will Hermes of Pitchfork commented "The playfully fizzy 'Lover Girl,' punctuated with chipper handclaps, is incongruously hard-spitting, and gets bonus points for the ramen-joint choreography in its video clip". Quentin Harrison of The Line of Best Fit stated "Laufey demonstrates that love often exists somewhere between the poles of escapism and reality", adding that this is "done brilliantly" on "Lover Girl". Reviewing A Matter of Time for Melodic, Ezra Kendrick considered the song a "nice lead into the rest of the album" as it "showcases the sound and artistry" that Laufey has developed. In addition, he wrote that the strings during the chorus "perfectly encapsulate the growing infatuation that the singer is feeling" and regarded the song as a "nice introduction to the eventual love that will fall apart in the album".

=== Accolades ===
Nominations for "Lover Girl"
Organisation	Year	Category	Result	Ref.
Icelandic Music Awards	2026	Pop Song and Composition of the Year	Nominated	

== Live performances ==
Laufey performed the song on Good Morning America on 15 August 2025, and on The Tonight Show Starring Jimmy Fallon on 10 December.

== Charts ==
Weekly chart performance for "Lover Girl"
Chart (2025)	Peak position
Canada (Canadian Hot 100)	90
Iceland (Tónlistinn)	11
Italy Airplay (EarOne)	69
New Zealand Hot Singles (RMNZ)	25
US Billboard Hot 100	91
US Adult Pop Airplay (Billboard)	29
US Pop Airplay (Billboard)	29

== Certifications ==
Certifications and sales for "Lover Girl"
Region	Certification	Certified units/sales
New Zealand (RMNZ)	Gold	15,000^{‡}
United States (RIAA)	Gold	500,000^{‡}
^{‡} Sales+streaming figures based on certification alone.

== Release history ==
Release history for "Lover Girl"
Region	Date	Format	Version	Label(s)	Ref.
Various	25 June 2025	Streaming	Original	Vingolf; AWAL	
Italy	3 July 2025	Radio airplay	Original	AWAL	
United States	7 October 2025	Contemporary hit radio	Original	AWAL	
Various	6 February 2026	12-inch vinyl (B-side)	Original	Vingolf; AWAL	
