= Silver Lining (Laufey song) =

2025 single by Laufey

Single by Laufey

from the album A Matter of Time
- Released: 3 April 2025
- Length: 3:17
- Label: Vingolf; AWAL
- Songwriters: Laufey; Spencer Stewart
- Producers: Laufey; Spencer Stewart

Laufey singles chronology
"Christmas Magic" (2024)	"Silver Lining" (2025)	"Tough Luck" (2025)

Music video
- "Silver Lining" on YouTube

"Silver Lining" is a song by Icelandic singer Laufey. It was released on 3 April 2025 as the lead single from her third studio album, A Matter of Time (2025).

== Background ==
In announcing the single, Laufey described "Silver Lining" as "a love song about being able to set your true personality free when you fall in love". She explained that the track captures the feeling of emotional liberation and vulnerability that love can inspire, stating, "Your inner child comes out and you are emboldened by lust. Even if it takes you to hell, at least you're with your partner".

== Music video ==
The video for "Silver Lining" depicts Laufey attending a fantastical masquerade ball, surrounded by colorful characters and The Rite of Spring-inspired choreography. As the narrative unfolds, the party descends into a surreal hellscape, reflecting a chaos of her own making. Directed by Jason Lester —who previously collaborated with Laufey on the videos for "From the Start" and "Santa Baby"— the visual was shot on 35mm film to enhance its distinctive atmosphere.

== Charts ==
=== Weekly charts ===
Weekly chart performance for "Silver Lining"
Chart (2025)	Peak position
Iceland (Tónlistinn)	25
New Zealand Hot Singles (RMNZ)	13
US Adult Alternative Airplay (Billboard)	32

=== Year-end charts ===
Year-end chart performance for "Silver Lining"
Chart (2025)	Position
Iceland (Tónlistinn)	84

== Release history ==
Release history for "Silver Lining"
Region	Date	Format(s)	Version	Label(s)	Ref.
Various	3 April 2025	Streaming; digital download	Original	Vingolf; AWAL	
Italy	10 April 2025	Radio airplay	Original	AWAL	
Various	25 April 2025	Streaming; digital download	Sped-up	Vingolf; AWAL	
