= Tough Luck (song) =

2025 single by Laufey

Single by Laufey

from the album A Matter of Time
- Released: 15 May 2025
- Length: 3:12
- Label: Vingolf; AWAL
- Songwriters: Laufey; Spencer Stewart
- Producers: Laufey; Spencer Stewart

Laufey singles chronology
"Silver Lining" (2025)	"Tough Luck" (2025)	"Lover Girl" (2025)

Lyric video
- "Tough Luck" on YouTube

"Tough Luck" is a song by Icelandic singer Laufey. It was released on 15 May 2025 as the second single from her third studio album, A Matter of Time (2025). Alongside the album announcement, Laufey released the jazz-influenced single "Tough Luck". The song contrasts light melodies with candid lyrics about a difficult relationship, including one explicit lyric, indicating a departure from her usual style.

== Background ==
The song serves as Laufey's second release of 2025, following "Silver Lining", which was released on 3 April. Both singles come after her 2024 live album A Night at the Symphony: Live at the Hollywood Bowl and the holiday EP A Very Laufey Holiday. Laufey also performed three sold-out concerts in the Philippines in 2024 — two with the Manila Philharmonic Orchestra on 28–29 May at the PICC Plenary Hall, and her first-ever arena show at the SM Mall of Asia Arena on 2 September.

== Promotion ==
Prior to its official release, Laufey performed "Tough Luck" at a Grammy conference held on 26 April 2025. She made the first televised performance of the song on Jimmy Kimmel Live! on 21 May 2025. The track was officially sent to Icelandic radio stations, like the previous single "Silver Lining", on the week of 23 May 2025.

== Composition ==
"Tough Luck" is a fiery, fast-paced song in D♭ major that explores the end of a toxic relationship. Over ascending melodies and sharp instrumentation, Laufey sings, "Tough luck, my boy, your time is up / I'll break it first, I've had enough / Of waiting 'til you lie and cheat..." In a press statement, she explained that the track was meant to showcase "an angrier side" of herself — one brought out by the difficult experience that inspired the song. Variety described the track as continuing in the tradition of Laufey's earlier song "Goddess", noting its contrast between a light, jazz-influenced sound and emotionally pointed lyrics. Elle described the song as a track where Laufey "disses a loser ex-boyfriend with angelic vocals and a climactic bridge".

== Charts ==
Weekly chart performance for "Tough Luck"
Chart (2025)	Peak position
Iceland (Tónlistinn)	36
New Zealand Hot Singles (RMNZ)	11
