= Spinks House =

Coordinates: 34°7′26.4″N 118°7′51.9″W

William Ward Spinks House
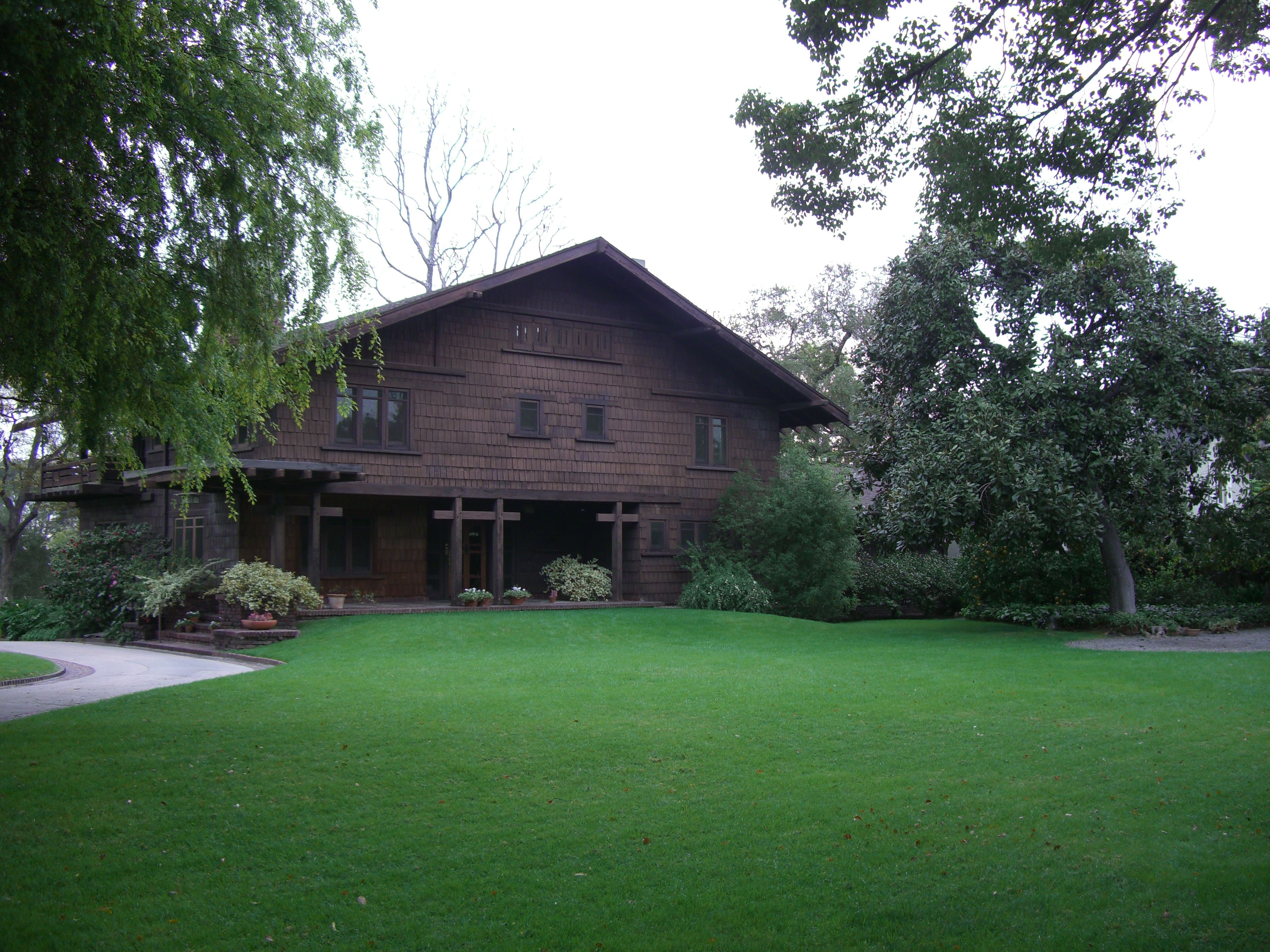
- Interactive map of the William Ward Spinks House area

General information
- Type: House
- Location: 1344 Hillcrest Avenue, Pasadena, California
- Construction started: 1909

Design and construction
- Architect: Greene & Greene

The Spinks House, also known as Margaret B. S. Clapham Spinks House, (constructed 1908 - 1909) is a restored example of a California bungalow in Pasadena, California, USA. The house and grounds were designed by Henry Mather Greene of the architectural firm Greene and Greene as a home for Margaret B. S. Clapham Spinks and the retired judge William Ward Spinks.

== Design ==
Designed and built as a permanent home for retired judge William Ward Spinks, who had recently moved to Southern California from Victoria, Canada, the three-story (plus basement) Spinks House is a classic example of a California bungalow built during America's Arts and Crafts movement. Though a far simpler version of such a house than its more grandiose, up-the-street neighbor, the Blacker House, its style shows influence from traditional Japanese aesthetics and a certain California spaciousness born of available land and a permissive climate. The Arts and Crafts Movement in American Craftsman style architecture was focused on the use of natural materials, attention to detail, aesthetics, and craftsmanship. The Spinks House is unique in that it is among a small handful of Greene & Greene houses with its entire original property intact. With re-development in Pasadena, the Spinks house's initial interior and exterior design integrity may be comprised if sold again.

=== Interiors ===
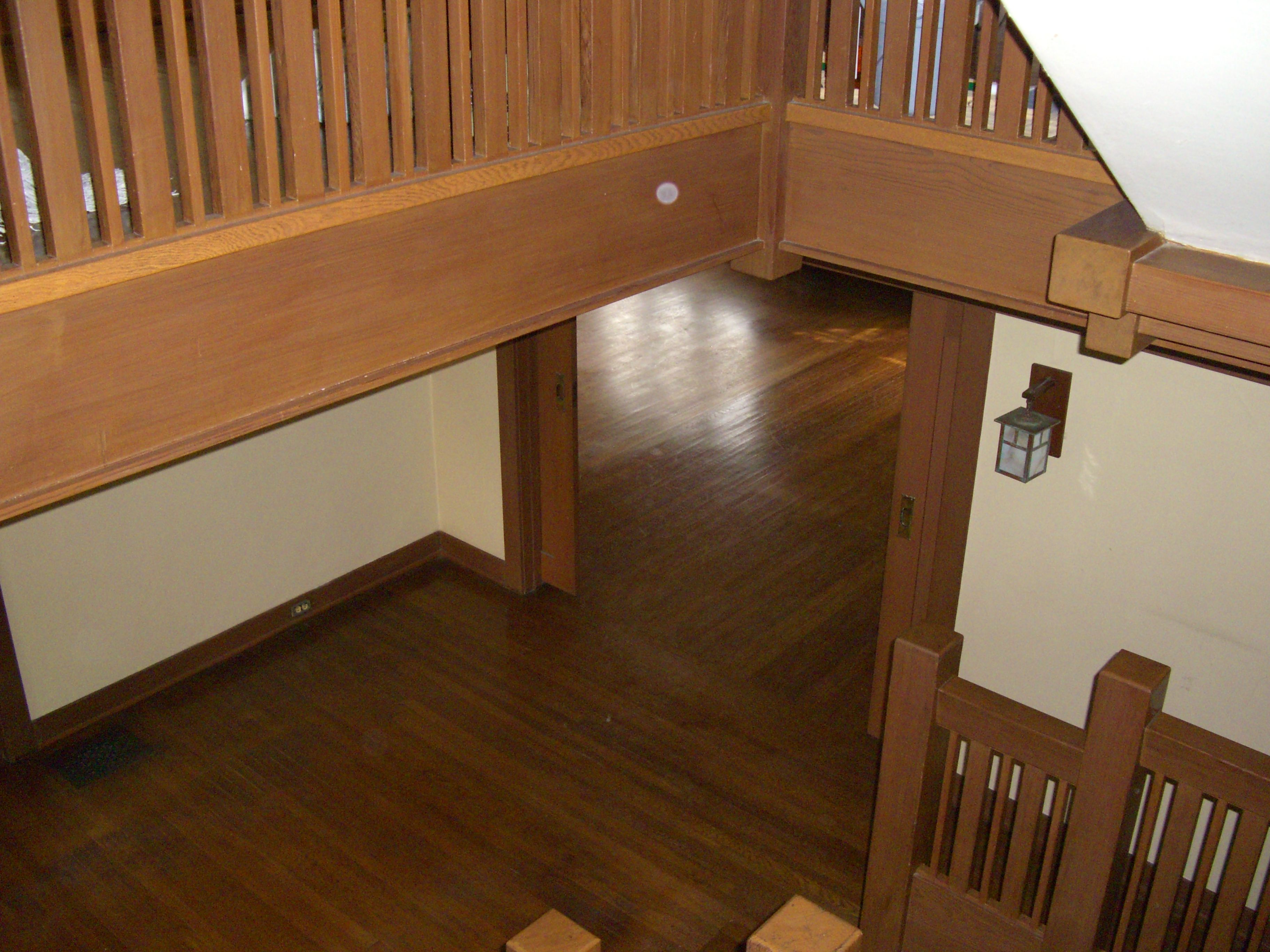
View of entry hall from the main staircase

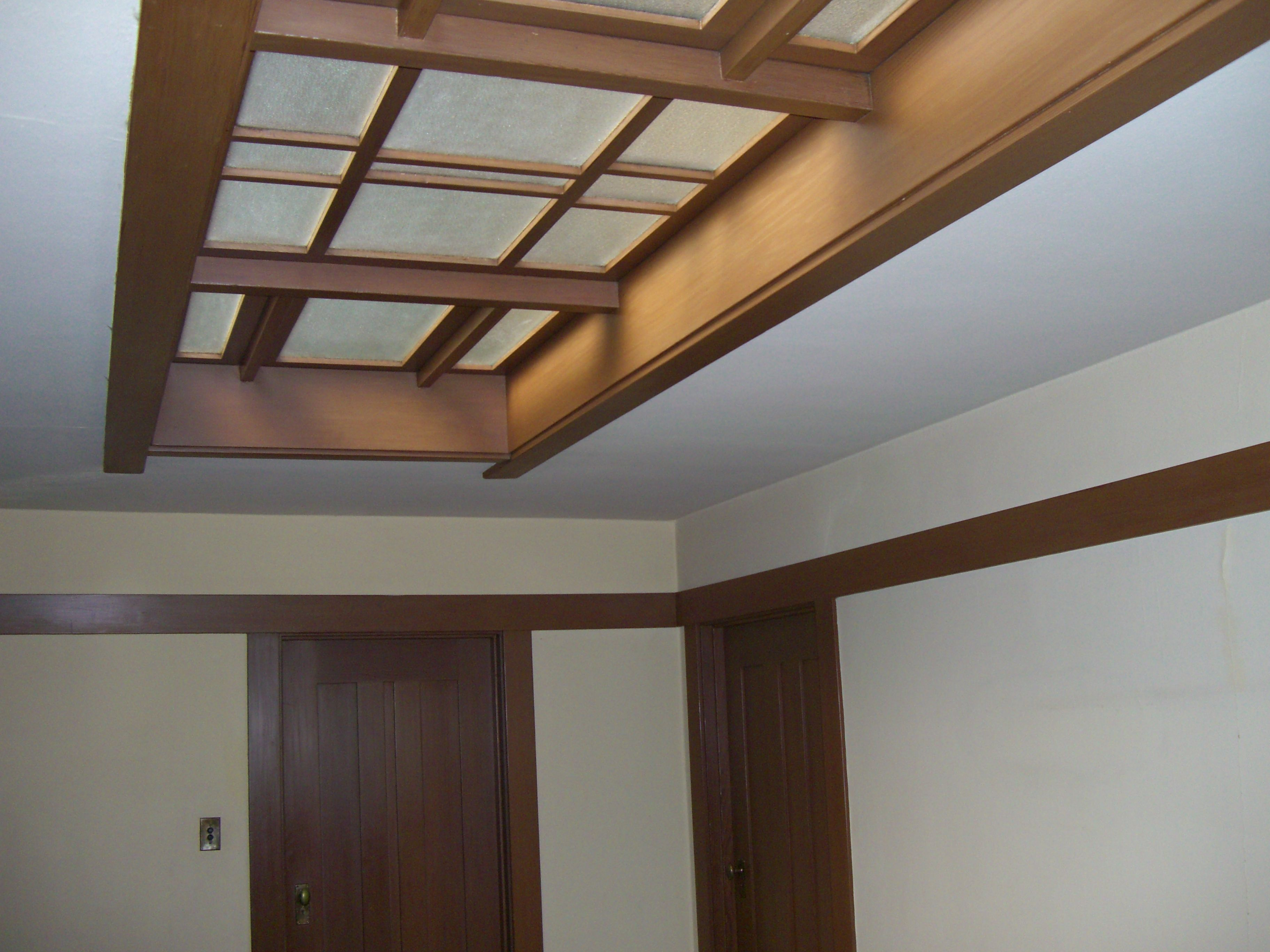
Second-story skylight

Rooms in the Spinks house were built primarily with plaster walls adorned sparingly with redwood and some Port Orford Cedar fascia boards. The main staircase, well lit by a large second-story skylight, was created using a significant amount of wood and incorporates two landings. Although much of the wood was covered in paint over the years, it was painstakingly restored by owners around 1970. The more-or-less square layout of the house remains largely intact as originally built, and very few modifications have been made to the house in its over 100 years of existence. The only significant changes to the house include an early 20th-century garage expansion to allow the formerly one-car garage with workroom and chauffeur's quarters to accommodate three cars, and a one-story expansion of the house to the south to accommodate two maid's rooms. The latter change was designed by the original architectural firm of Greene & Greene.

=== Exterior and gardens ===
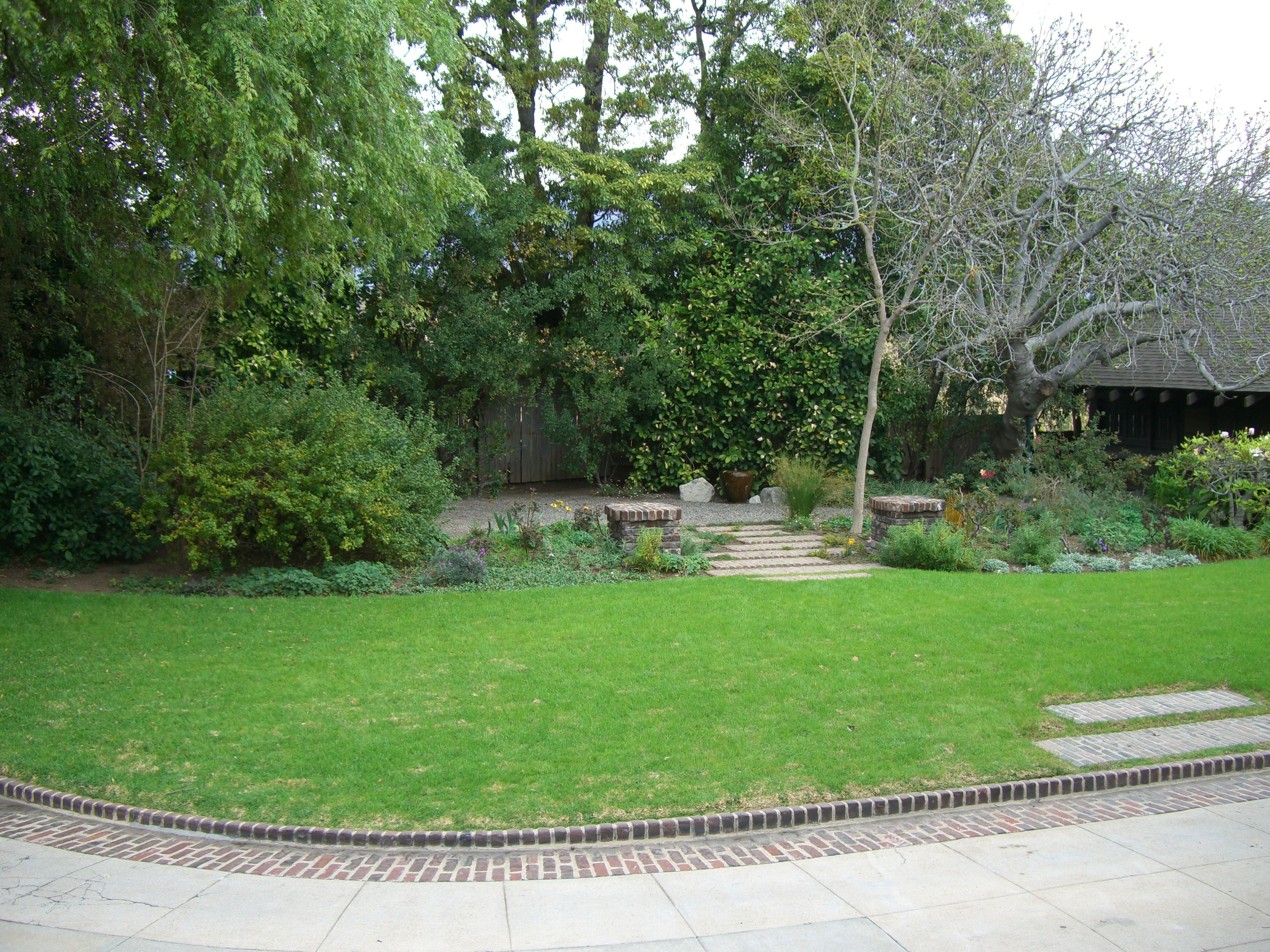
View of the north terrace.

The grounds of the Spinks House comprise nearly 1.5 acres (0.6 hectares) along the edge of a deep wooded canyon. The original landscape plan called for simple plantings with several oak trees and a small orange grove. Aside from the long, narrow driveway with a wide turnaround in front of the garage, the grounds were designed to be largely free of any formal hardscape elements. The only notable exception is an extensive winding river rock-lined pathway, approximately 400 feet long, that gently climbs down into the canyon. Subsequent landscaping projects in the 1970s, 80s, and 90s saw the construction of several terraces and other outdoor areas, including a formal kitchen garden and north terrace designed by the architect's granddaughter, Isabelle Greene.
