= Thomas Gould Jr. House =

Historic house in California, United States

- U.S. National Register of Historic Places
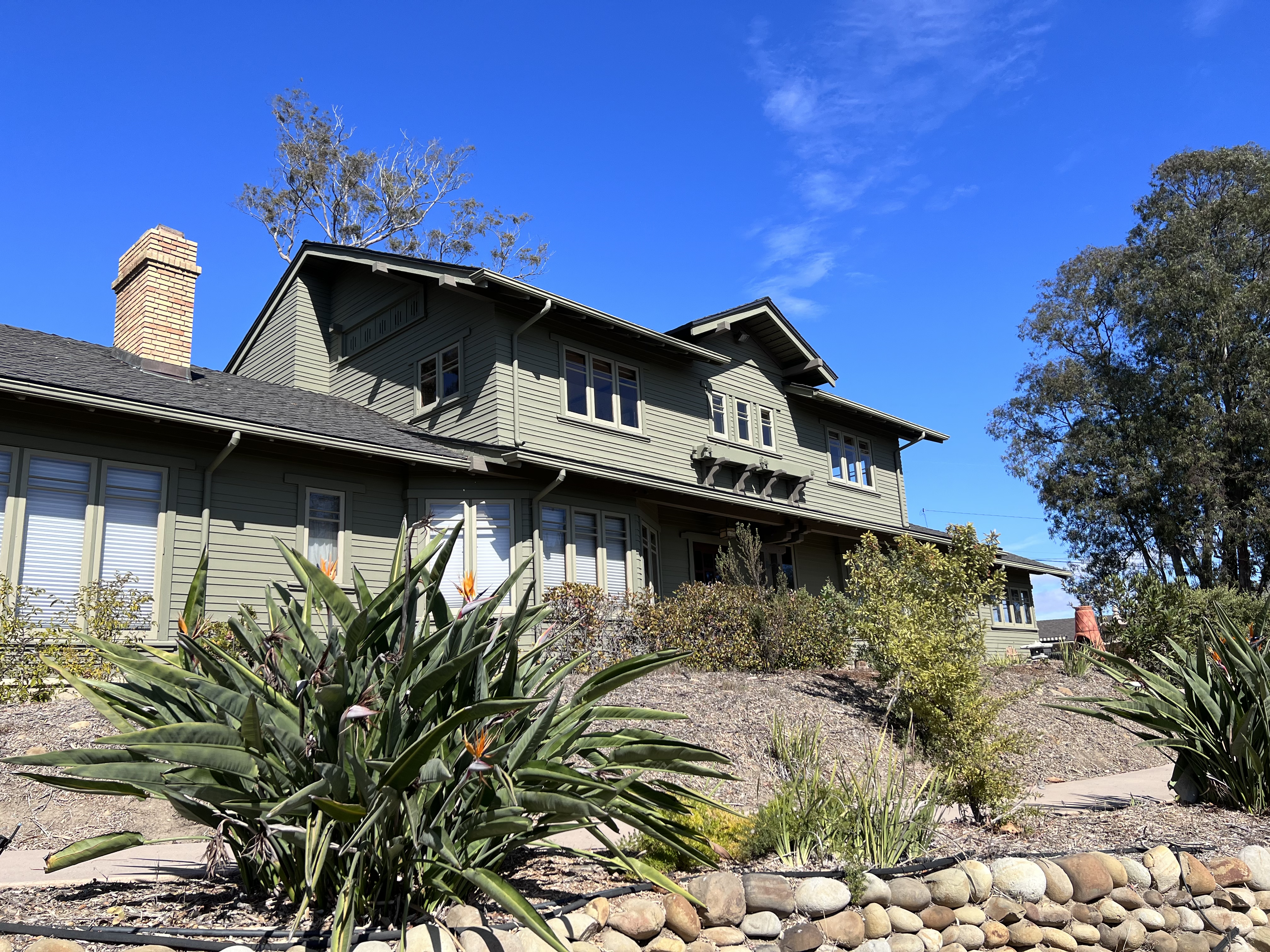

- Location within California Location within the United States
- Location: 402 Lynn Drive; Ventura, California, United States
- Coordinates: 34°16′48″N 119°15′00″W
- Built: 1924
- Architect: Henry Mather Greene
- Architectural style: American Craftsman
- NRHP reference No.: 05001426
- Added to NRHP: December 23, 2005

The Thomas Gould Jr. House is a historic house in Ventura, California. Architect Henry Mather Greene designed the American Craftsman style California bungalow, which was built in 1924. The house is considered one of the best examples of Henry Greene's independent work; most of his other designs were created alongside his brother Charles as Greene & Greene. The two-story house has a wood frame and redwood siding and window casings. The gable roof features truncated ends and a small gable on the front side which resembles a dormer. The house's interior decorations include ceiling moldings, a leaded glass china cabinet, and a carved mirror, the latter being the only piece of furniture designed by Greene himself.

The historic residence was listed on the National Register of Historic Places in 2005.

== See also ==
- Arts and Crafts Movement
- List of Registered Historic Places in Ventura County, California
