= Thorsen House =

Historic house in California, United States

- William R. Thorsen House
- U.S. National Register of Historic Places
- Berkeley Landmark
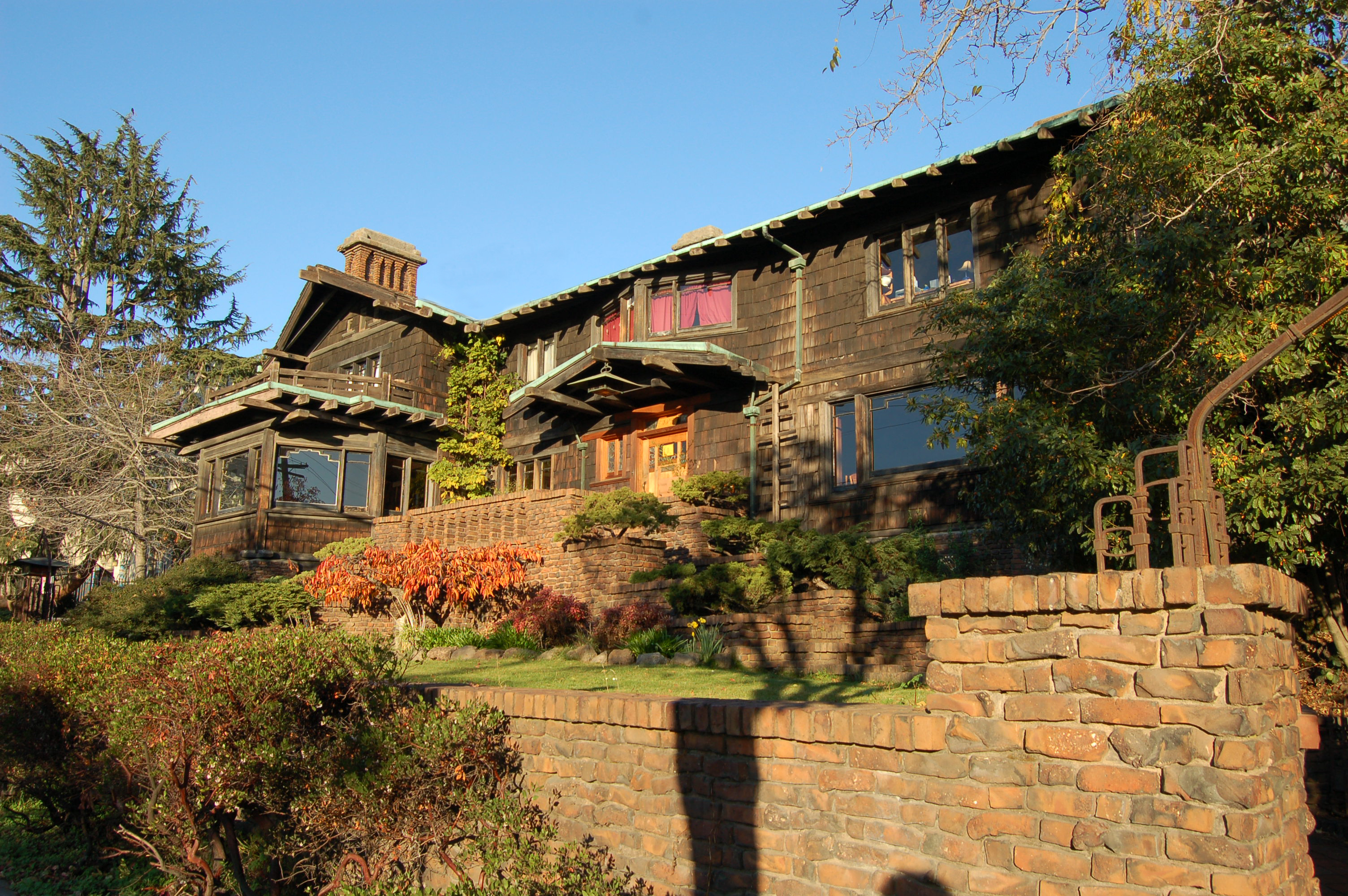

- Location within Oakland, California Location within California Location within the United States
- Location: 2307 Piedmont Avenue, Berkeley, California
- Coordinates: 37°52′8.34″N 122°15′7.09″W
- Area: 0.4 acres (0.16 ha)
- Built: 1909
- Architect: Greene & Greene
- Architectural style: Ultimate bungalow, American Craftsman
- NRHP reference No.: 78000646
- BERKL No.: 4

Significant dates
- Added to NRHP: November 20, 1978
- Designated BERKL: December 15, 1975

The William R. Thorsen House, also known as the Sigma Phi-Thorsen House, is a historic residence in Berkeley, California. Built in 1909 for William and Caroline Thorsen, it was the last of five so-called "ultimate bungalows" to be designed by Charles and Henry Greene, principles in the architectural firm of Greene & Greene. Three others (Ford, Gamble, Blacker) are in Pasadena, and one (Pratt) is in Ojai, California. The term "ultimate bungalow" was coined by Robert Judson Clark in the 1960s, but is technically a misnomer, since bungalows are typically small, one-story houses. However, "Craftsman bungalows" of the early twentieth century do share some characteristics with the larger houses of Greene & Greene, including the Thorsen House.

Since 1942, the house has been the home of the California Alpha Chapter of the Sigma Phi Society, the oldest national fraternity in continuous existence. It houses members of Sigma Phi Society, hosts communal dinners, organizes small concerts, and offers tours for other students and members of the public, welcoming thousands of visitors a year.

The Thorsen House may be toured throughout the week on an informal basis; one can simply knock on the door to visit.

== History ==
Detail of Leaded Art Glass window in the Thorsen House.

=== Namesake ===
The Thorsen House is named after William Randolph Thorsen (1860-1942), a successful lumber merchant from Michigan who relocated in the early years of the twentieth century to Tuolumne, California, and later to Berkeley. He was for many years president of the West Side Lumber Company. His wife, Caroline Canfield Thorsen (1858-1942), was the younger sister of another Greene & Greene client, Nellie Canfield Blacker, and her husband, Robert R. Blacker, whose house in Pasadena, California was built in 1907. The Thorsens resided in their Greene & Greene home following its construction in 1909 and until their deaths in 1942.

=== Design ===
The Thorsen house is an elaborate example of the American Craftsman style, an offshoot of the British Arts and Crafts Movement. Greene & Greene houses characteristically express their structures boldly in wood, and in their most artistic projects (including the Thorsen House, as well as in the Gamble House and Blacker House, both in Pasadena), the architects specified exotic species of wood, and decorative painting, to finish the interiors.

The entry hall of the Thorsen House is paneled in Burmese Teak while the living and dining rooms are paneled in Honduras Mahogany with square ebony plugs covering brass wood screws. The fireplace in the living room is surrounded in mauve tile from the Grueby Faience Company. The front door and side lights contain leaded art glass in the design of a gnarled grape vine, executed by Emil Lange, who created art-glass designs for several other Greene & Greene houses, including the Gamble House. Greene & Greene were also commissioned to design furniture for the Thorsen's dining room, and were also called back subsequently to design additional furniture, as well as modest additions and alterations to the house itself.

== See also ==
- Gamble House
- Robert R. Blacker House
- Collegiate Secret Societies of North America
- North American fraternity and sorority housing
- List of Berkeley Landmarks in Berkeley, California

== Related reading ==
- Bosley, Edward R. and Clark, Robert Judson, and Makinson, Randell L. (1996) Last of the Ultimate Bungalows. The William R. Thorsen House of Greene and Greene (an exhibition guide published by The Gamble House, University of Southern California)
- Makinson, Randall (2001) Greene & Greene: Architecture as a Fine Art (Gibbs Smith) ISBN 978-1586851057
- Johnson, Robert; Janet Byron (2015) Berkeley Walks: Revealing Rambles through America's Most Intriguing City (Roaring Forties Press) ISBN 9781938901515
