= Ultimate bungalow =

Style of house

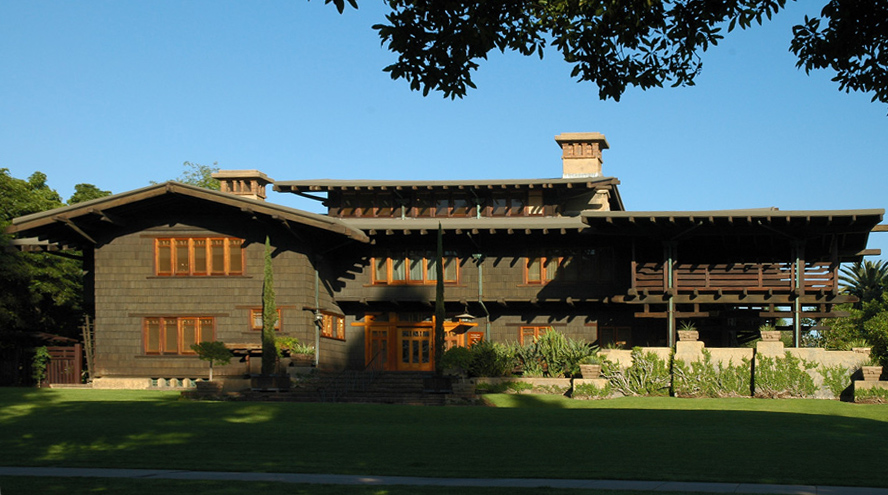
The Gamble House, seen in April 2005.

An ultimate bungalow is a large and detailed American Craftsman-style home, based on the bungalow form.

== Overview ==
The ultimate bungalow style is associated with such California architects as Greene and Greene, Bernard Maybeck and Julia Morgan. Some of the hallmarks of Greene and Greene's ultimate bungalows include the use of tropical woods such as mahogany, ebony and teak, and use of inlays of wood, metal and mother-of-pearl.

As in their other major projects, Charles and Henry Greene—and to a lesser extent Bernard Maybeck and a few other Craftsman-era architects who built such homes—sometimes designed the majority of furniture, textiles, fixtures and other interior details of these homes specifically for their location both in the house and in the larger landscape.

The term "ultimate bungalow" was popularized by its use as a chapter title in the 1977 book Greene & Greene, Architecture as a Fine Art by Randell Makinson. The houses discussed in the chapter were the Greenes' Robert Blacker, David Gamble, Charles Pratt, Freeman Ford, William Thorsen, Earle C. Anthony, Dr. Crow, Willam Spinks, and William Lawless residences.

== Notable examples ==
Houses recognized as ultimate bungalows include:

- Gamble House in Pasadena, California
- William R. Thorsen House in Berkeley, California
- Robert R. Blacker House in Pasadena, California
- Madison House in Pasadena, California
- Charles M. Pratt House, also known as "Casa Barranca", in Ojai, California (built 1909)
- John T. Greene Residence in Sacramento, California
