= California bungalow =

Architectural style

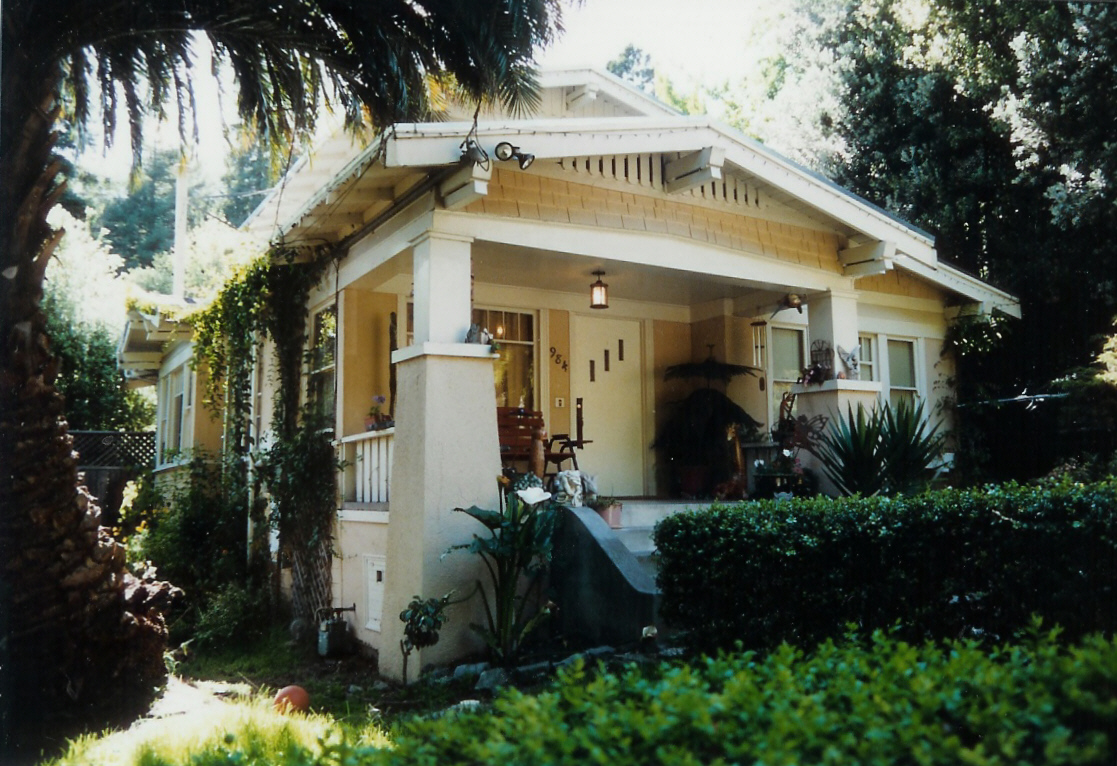
A typical California bungalow, in Berkeley, California

California bungalow is an alternative name for the American Craftsman style of residential architecture, when it was applied to small-to-medium-sized homes rather than the large "ultimate bungalow" houses of designers like Greene and Greene. California bungalows became popular in suburban neighborhoods across the United States, and to varying extents elsewhere, from around 1910 to 1939.

== Principal features ==
=== Exterior ===
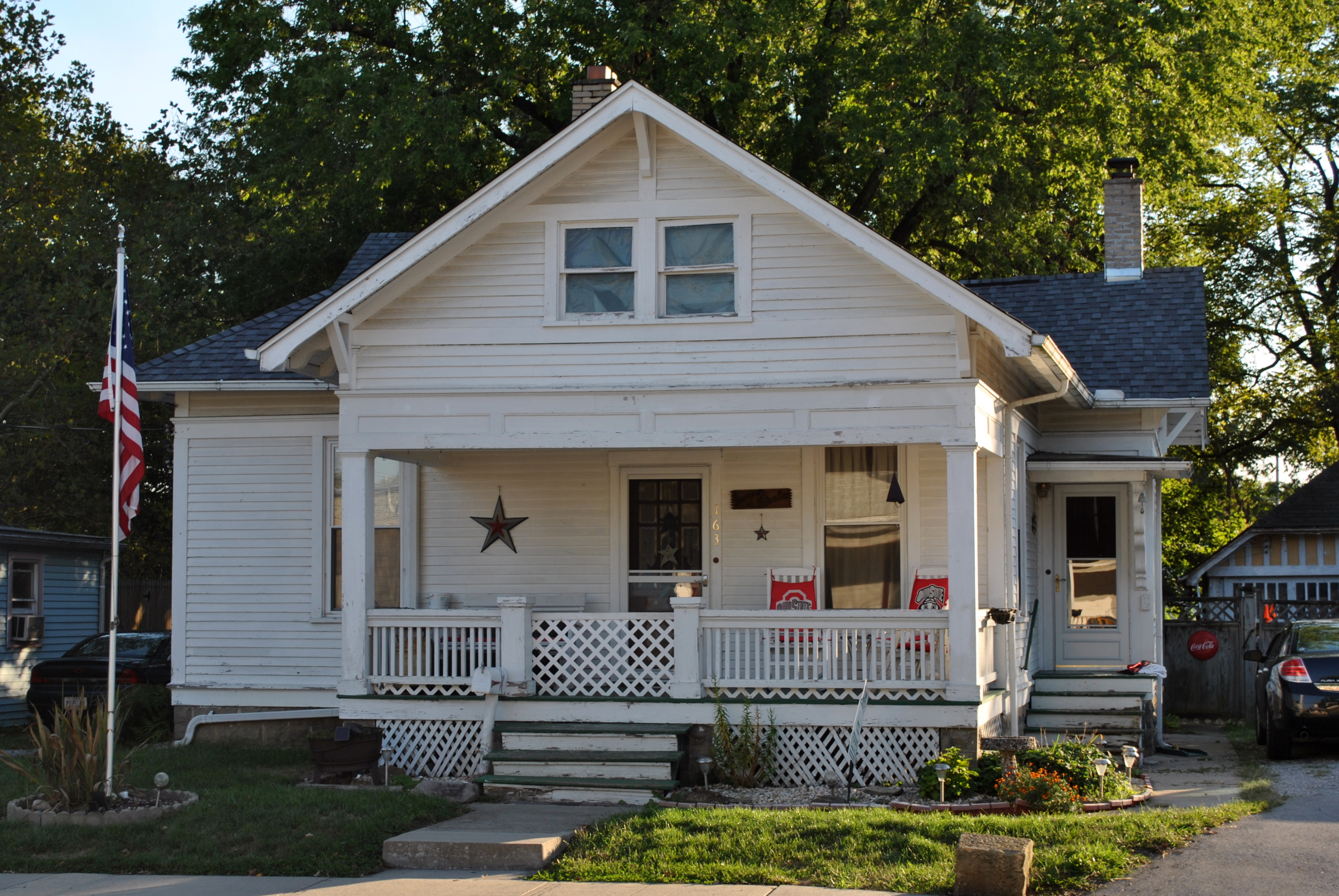
Zellers-Langel House, Franklin County, Ohio

Bungalows are 1- or 1 1/2-story houses, with sloping roofs and eaves with unenclosed rafters, and typically feature a dormer window (or an attic vent designed to look like one) over the main portion of the house. Ideally, bungalows are horizontal in massing, and are integrated with the earth by use of local materials and transitional plantings. This helps create the signature look typically associated with the California bungalow.

Bungalows commonly have wood shingle, horizontal siding or stucco exteriors, as well as brick or stone exterior chimneys and a partial-width front porch. Larger bungalows might have asymmetrical L-shaped porches. The porches were often enclosed at a later date, in response to increased street noise. A "California" bungalow (except in Australia, see below) is not made of brick, but in other bungalows, most notably in the Chicago area, this is commonplace due in large part to the weather.

A variation called the "Airplane Bungalow" has a much smaller area on its second floor, centered on the structure, and is thought to look like the cockpit of an early airplane.

=== Interior ===
True bungalows do not include quarters for servants, and have a simple living room, entered directly from the front door, in place of parlors and sitting rooms, as well as a smaller kitchen. The focal point of the living room is the fireplace, and the living room often has a broad opening into a separate dining room.

All common areas are on the first floor with cozy atmospheres. Though the ceilings are lower than in homes of Victorian architecture, they often feature redwood beams and are usually higher than in ranches and other homes built later. Attics are located under the sloping roof.

== Early history ==
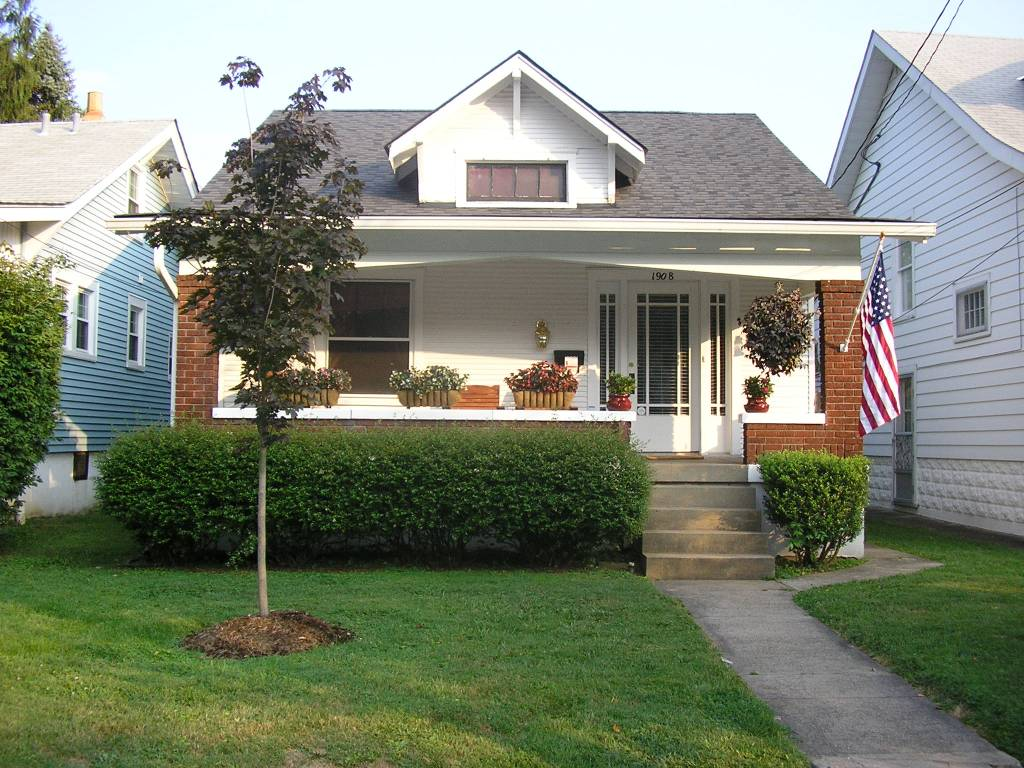
A typical side-gabled bungalow in Louisville's Deer Park Neighborhood

The bungalow actually traces its origins to the Indian province of Bengal, the word itself derived from the Hindi bangla or house in Bengali style. The native thatched roof huts were adapted by the British, who built bungalows as houses for administrators and as summer retreats. Refined and popularized in California, many books list the first California house dubbed a bungalow as the one designed by the San Francisco architect A. Page Brown in the early 1890s. However, Brown's close friend, Reverend Joseph Worcester (1836-1913), designed a bungalow for himself and erected it at 555 Blair Ave, atop a hill in Piedmont, California, in Oakland, California, across the bay from San Francisco, in 1877–78. The bungalow influenced Bernard Maybeck, Willis Polk and other San Francisco architects, and Jack London, who rented Worcester's house from 1902 to 1903, called it a "bungalow with a capital 'B'".

The bungalow became popular because it met the needs of changing times in which the lower middle class were moving from apartments to private houses in great numbers. Bungalows were modest, inexpensive and low-profile. Before World War I, a bungalow could be built for as little as $900 although the price rose to around $3,500 after the war. Bungalow designs were spread by the practice of building from mail-order plans available from illustrated catalogs, sometimes with alterations based on local practice or conditions. Contractors and builders would sell the catalogs at a low cost and in some cases, give them away for free. They contained pictures and drawings of artistic bungalows. The style was also connected with the desire to find relief from modern technology through a return to nature.

A variety of firms offered precut homes, which were shipped by rail or ship and assembled on site. These were most common in locations without a strong existing construction industry, or for company towns, to be built in a short time. The majority of bungalows did include some elements of mass production; typically doors, windows, and built-in furnishings such as bookcases, desks, or folding beds were sourced from lumber yards or from catalogs.

Bungalows can be found in the older neighborhoods of most American cities. In fact, they were so popular for a time that many cities have what is called a "Bungalow Belt" of homes built in the 1920s. These neighborhoods were often clustered along streetcar lines as they extended into the suburbs. Bungalows were built in smaller groups than is typical today, often one to three at a time.

=== United States ===
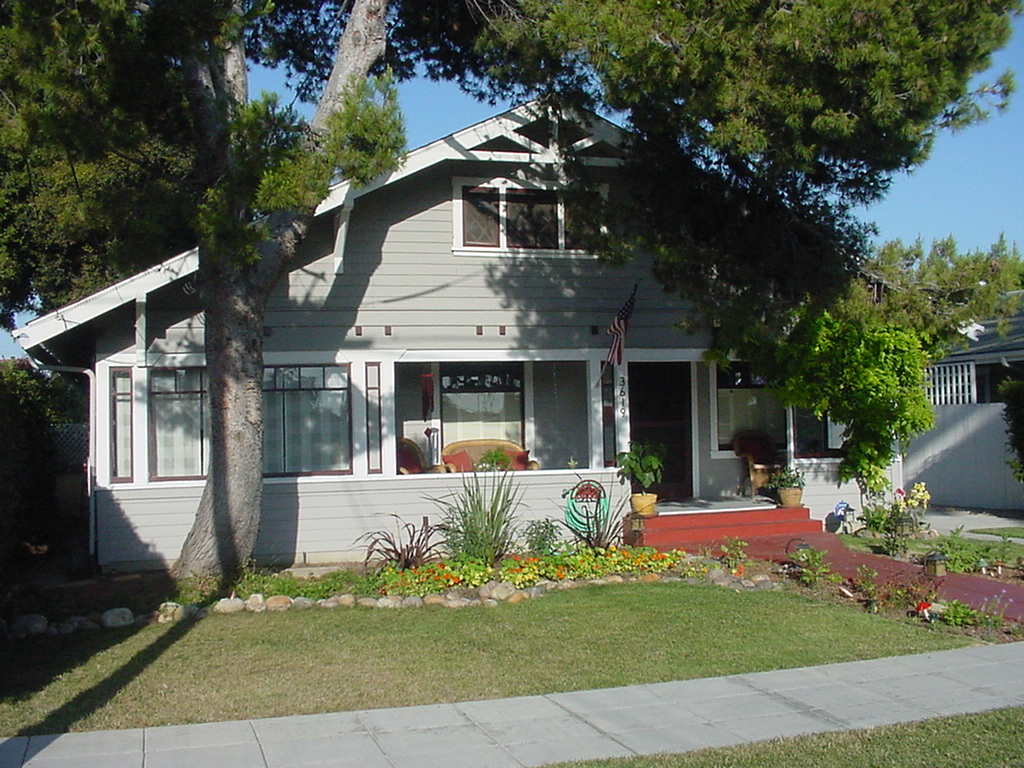
A typical front-gabled California bungalow along Utah Street in San Diego's North Park Neighborhood

Examples of neighborhoods in Southern California with a high concentration of California bungalows include: Belmont Heights in Long Beach, the Wood Streets in Riverside, Bungalow Heaven, Highland Park in Los Angeles, and North Park (site of the "Dryden District") in San Diego.

Separate from the main building, The Beverly Hills Hotel has 23 garden bungalows containing guests rooms and suites.

Examples of neighborhoods in other U.S. states include: the Avenues District in Salt Lake City; Westwood Park, San Francisco; Midtown Columbus, Georgia; Virginia Highland and Candler Park, Atlanta; Houston Heights in Houston; Park Hill and Washington Park in Denver; Takoma Park, Maryland, and Takoma, Washington, D.C.; Cherrydale and other neighborhoods in Arlington County, Virginia; Del Ray in Alexandria, Virginia; Historic Kenwood in St. Petersburg, Florida; The Garden District in Baton Rouge, Louisiana; and the West University Neighborhood in Tucson, Arizona.

=== Australia ===
The Californian bungalow style was particularly popular in Australia from 1913 onwards. This period coincided with the rise of the Hollywood film industry, which popularised American clothes, furniture, cars and houses, and also with the increased importation of U.S. architectural magazines into Australia, a society which previously had been heavily influenced by British domestic styles.

"...the concept of the bungalow as a cheap and attractive form of permanent suburban housing for the masses was stimulated by a variety of economic and social factors." Timber versions of the bungalow were a low cost solution to shortages in housing and the California designs suited the growing suburbs of the larger cities in southern Australia. Having a similar climate to that of California the designs also reflected the requirements of Australians who needed to cater for relatively warm summers and mild winters.

The bungalow in Australia underwent regional adaptations, often being built in the local red brick in Melbourne and the local liver-coloured brick of Sydney, and in limestone in South Australia. The bungalow was also constructed out of timber – in tropical Queensland these were raised on high (2.4 m (8 ft)) stilts as the Ashgrovian Queenslander (the idea being to protect against flooding, create a shaded area and to allow free movement of air in the hot climate). Key practitioners of the California bungalow style were Peddle and Thorp, Kenneth B. Milne, Alexander Stewart Jolly and Cedric Ballantyne. One of the outstanding examples was Jolly's Belvedere in the Sydney suburb of Cremorne. Belvedere is heritage-listed.

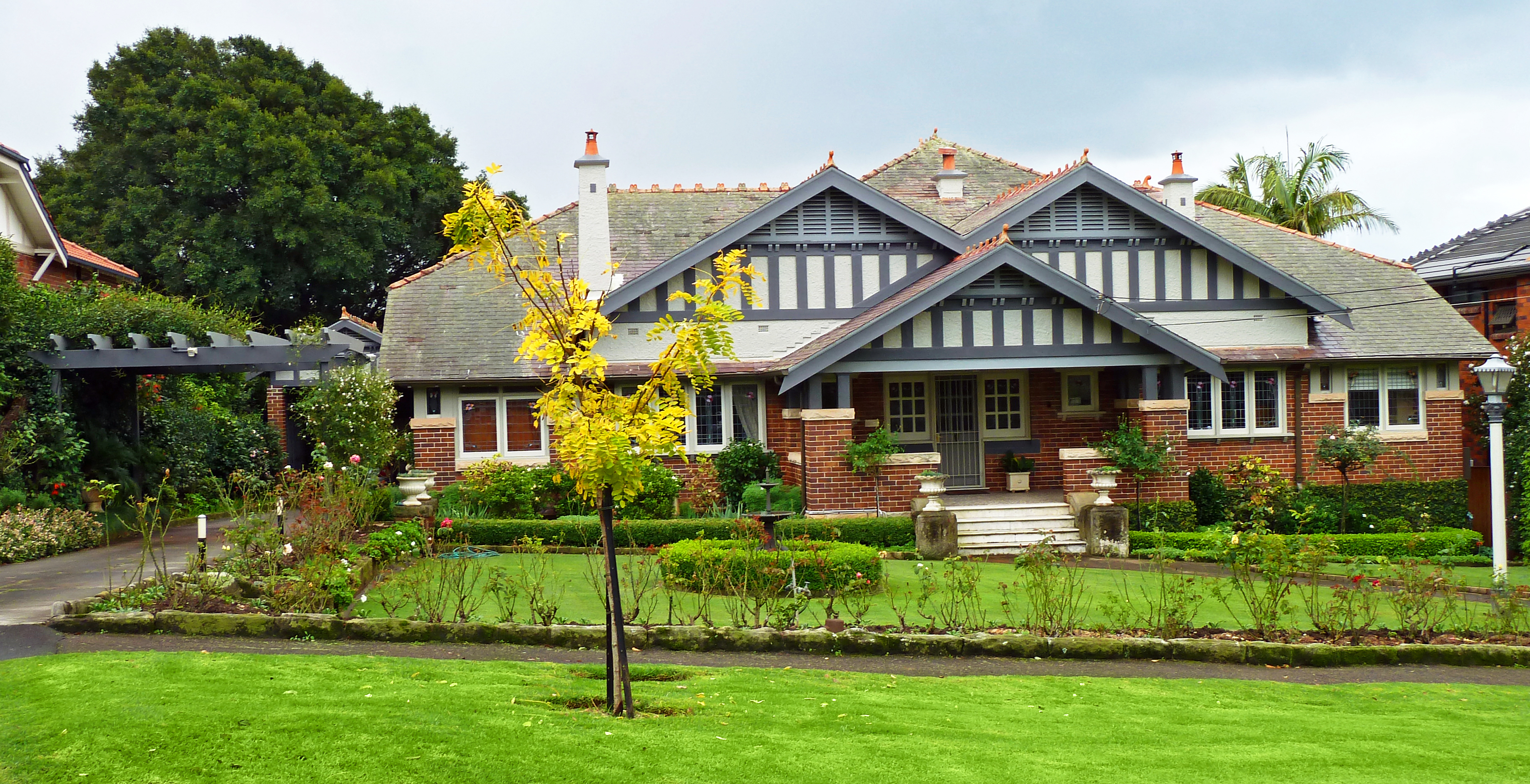
An Arts & Crafts bungalow style home in the Sydney suburb of Roseville

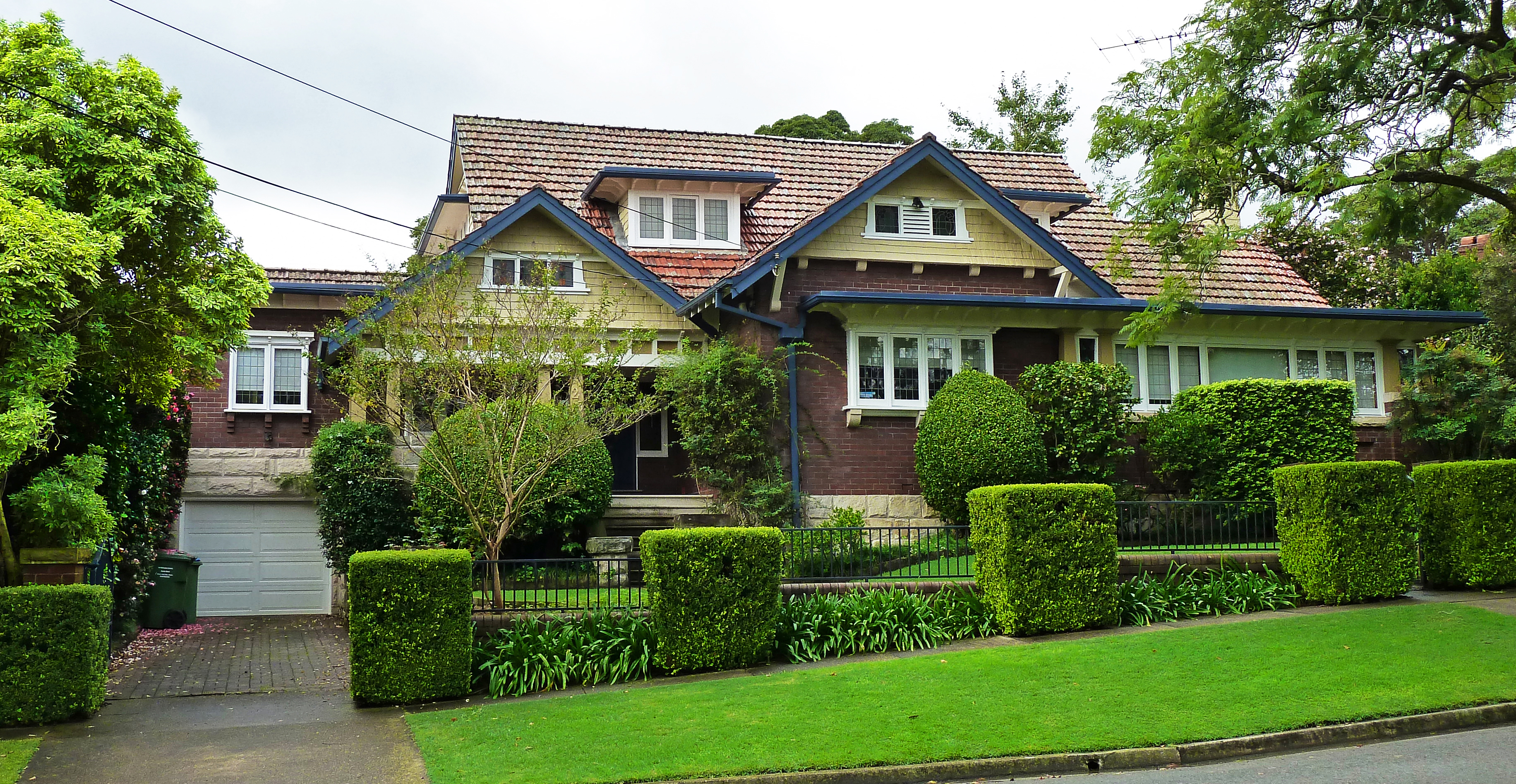
An Arts & Crafts bungalow-inspired style home in the Sydney suburb of Lindfield

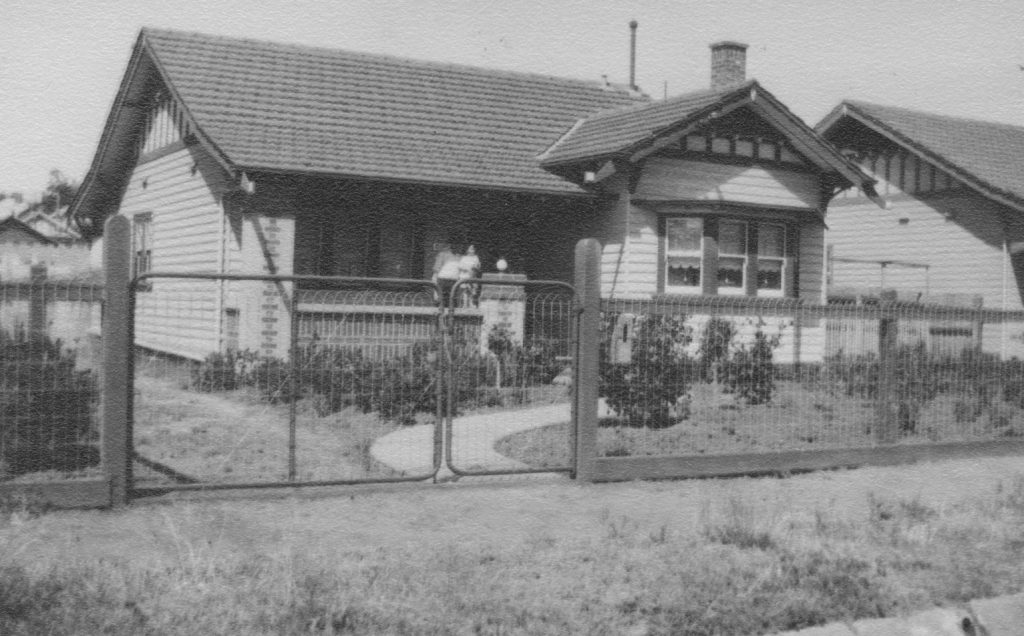
Simple low cost bungalow style home of timber, featuring imported redwood framing and terracotta tiled roof. Moonee Ponds, Victoria, built around 1928

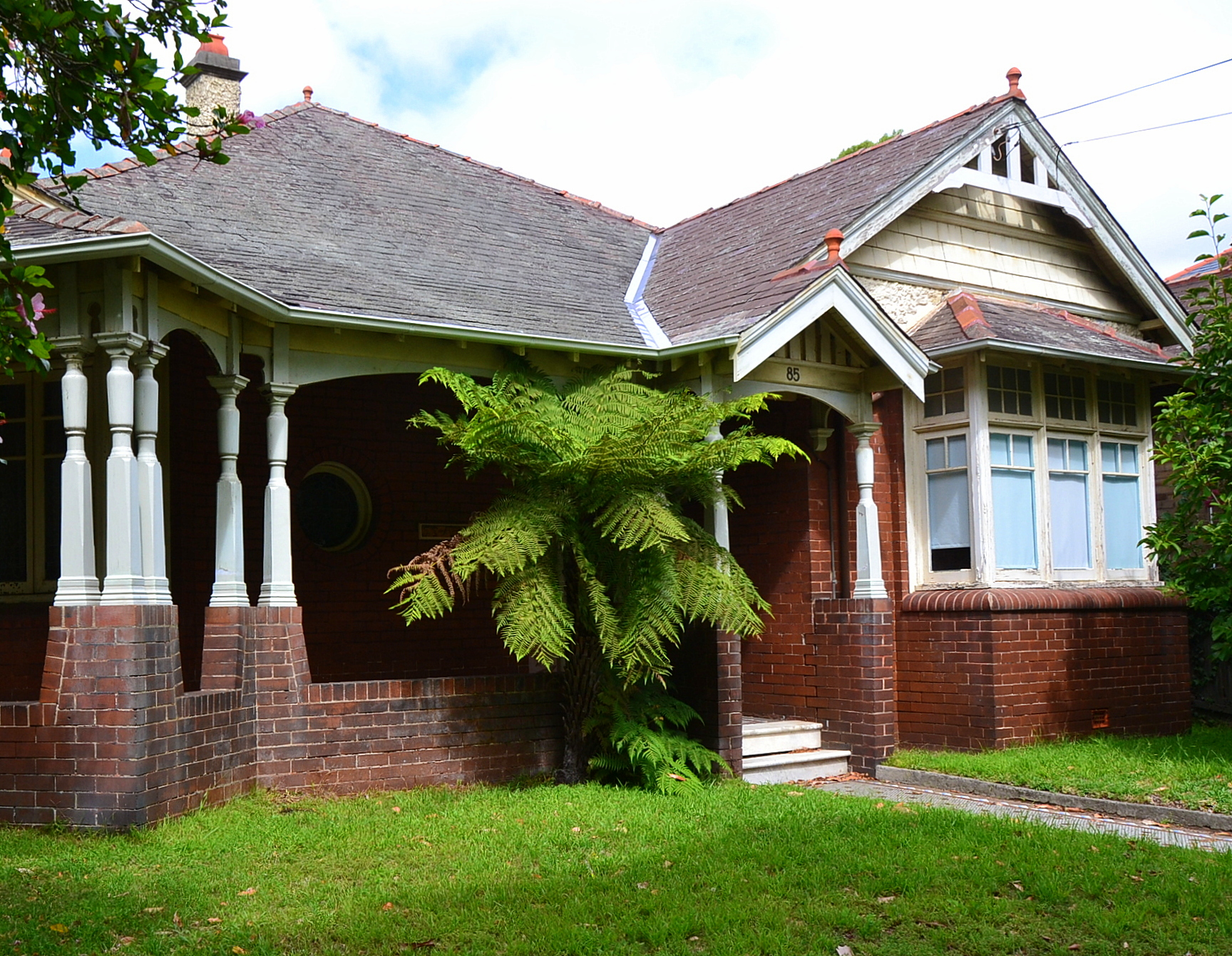
A Federation-inspired bungalow in the Sydney suburb of Randwick.

=== New Zealand ===
The Californian bungalow was also common in New Zealand during the latter 1910s and 1920s (e.g. Railway houses), and is credited with starting a trend towards bungalows and influencing new local styles of bungalow in New Zealand during the early decades of the 20th century.

== Stylistic evolution ==
The bungalow was so popular in California and Australia that very few houses were built in any other style during the 1920s. A range of other detailing influences, including Georgian Revival, Dutch Colonial Revival, Mission Revival, and Spanish Colonial Revival Styles became very popular in the first half of the 1900s.

=== Resurgence in interest in United States ===
Resurgent interest in the American Arts & Crafts or American Craftsman movement and the emergence of special-interest publications such as American Bungalow magazine have contributed to the bungalow's recent popularity. Rising house prices nationwide through the late 1990s and early 2000s as well as the central and convenient location of many bungalow-heavy urban neighborhoods have further fueled demand for these houses; as one example, some three-bedroom bungalows in San Diego can sell for $650,000 to $700,000, or more. The strength of the local housing market must be considered, however, as many bungalows in Detroit, Michigan, have been abandoned and are being razed.

== See also ==
- Ultimate bungalow, large and detailed Craftsman style homes.
- Airplane Bungalow
- American Foursquare
- Mar del Plata style

== Sources ==
- Butler, Graeme (1992). The Californian Bungalow in Australia. Port Melbourne: Lothian Press. ISBN 0-85091-355-1.
