= Darrell Peart =

American furniture maker and designer (born 1950)

Darrell Peart (born November 18, 1950) is an American furniture maker and designer, best known for his Greene and Greene style pieces.

== Publications ==
Greene and Greene: Design Elements for the Workshop Linden Publishing (April 1, 2006) ISBN 978-0-941936-96-5
