= American Craftsman =

Architectural style

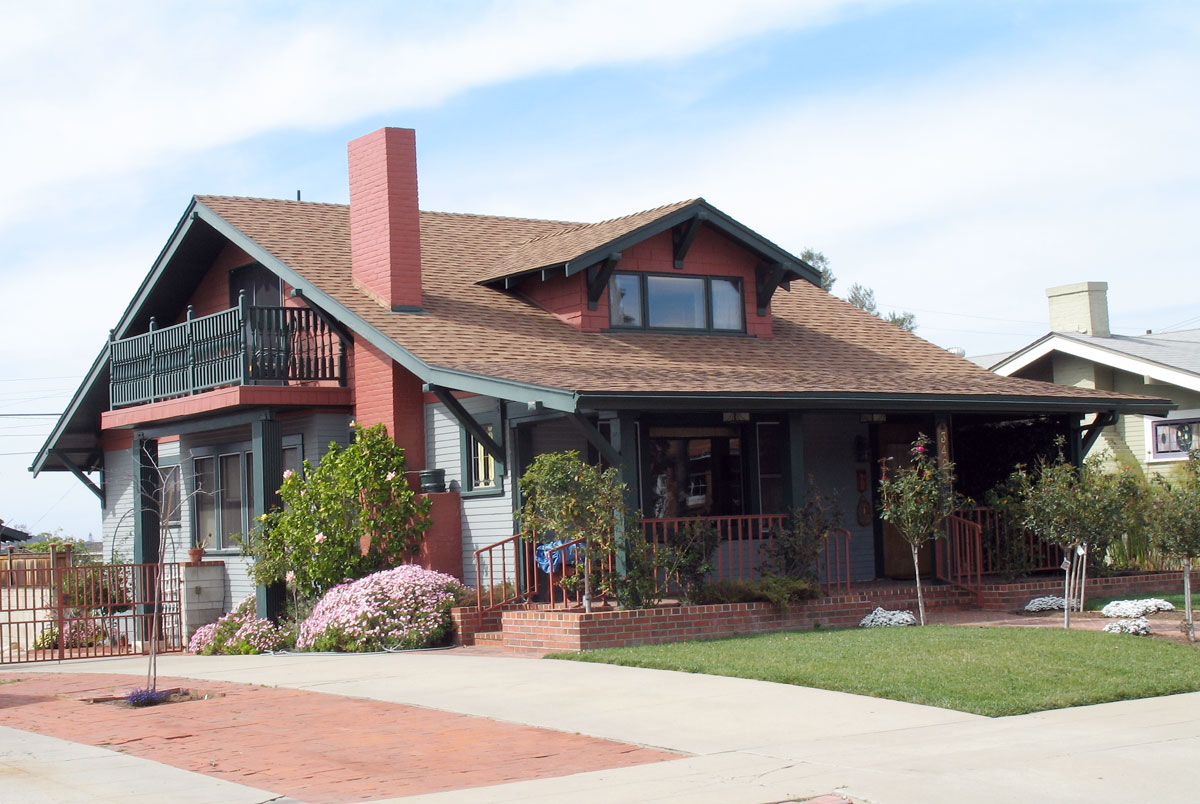
- An American Craftsman-style bungalow in San Diego, typical in older neighborhoods of many Western and Upper Midwest American cities
- Years active: 1890s–1930s
- Influences: Arts and Crafts movement

American Craftsman is an American domestic architectural style, inspired by the Arts and Crafts movement, which included interior design, landscape design, applied arts, and decorative arts, beginning in the last years of the 19th century. Its immediate ancestors in American architecture are the Shingle style, which began the move away from Victorian ornamentation toward simpler forms, and the Prairie style of Frank Lloyd Wright.

"Craftsman" was appropriated from furniture-maker Gustav Stickley, whose magazine The Craftsman was first published in 1901. The architectural style was most widely used in small-to-medium-sized Southern California single-family homes from about 1905, so the smaller-scale Craftsman style became known alternatively as "California bungalow". The style remained popular into the 1930s and has continued with revival and restoration projects.

== Influences ==
The American Craftsman style was a 20th century American offshoot of the British Arts and Crafts movement, which began as early as the 1860s.

A successor of other 19th century movements, such as the Gothic Revival and the Aesthetic Movement, the British Arts and Crafts movement was a reaction against the deteriorating quality of goods during the Industrial Revolution, and the corresponding devaluation of human labor, over-dependence on machines, and disbanding of the guild system. Members of the Arts and Crafts movement also balked at Victorian eclecticism, which cluttered rooms with mismatched, faux-historic goods to convey a sense of worldliness. The movement emphasized handwork over mass production. In some ways, it was just as much of a social movement as it was an aesthetic one, emphasizing the plight of the industrial worker and equating moral rectitude with the ability to create beautiful but simple things. These social currents can especially be seen in the writings of John Ruskin and William Morris, both highly influential thinkers for the movement. In addition, adherents sought to elevate the status of art forms that had previously been seen as a mere trade and not fine art.

The American movement also reacted against the eclectic Victorian "over-decorated" aesthetic. The arrival of the Arts and Crafts movement in late 19th century America coincided with the decline of the Victorian era. American Arts and Crafts were largely based on the nature surrounding their location. They have a rustic nature to them due to materials and their design. While the American Arts and Crafts movement shared many of the same goals as the British movement, such as social reform, a return to traditional simplicity over gaudy historic styles, the use of local natural materials, and the elevation of handicraft, it was also able to innovate: unlike the British movement, which had never been very good at figuring out how to make handcrafted production scalable, American Arts and Crafts designers were more adept at the business side of design and architecture, and were able to produce wares for a staunchly middle-class market. Gustav Stickley, in particular, hit a chord in the American populace with his goal of ennobling modest homes for a rapidly expanding American middle class, embodied in the Craftsman Bungalow style. Craftsman houses also featured decorative handcrafted woodwork.

In architecture, reacting to both Victorian architectural opulence and increasingly common mass-produced housing, the style incorporated a visibly sturdy structure of clean lines and natural materials. The movement's name American Craftsman came from the popular magazine, The Craftsman, founded in October 1901 by philosopher, designer, furniture maker, and editor Gustav Stickley. The magazine featured original house and furniture designs by Harvey Ellis, the Greene and Greene company, and others. The designs, while influenced by the ideals of the British movement, found inspiration in specifically American antecedents such as Shaker furniture and the Mission Revival Style, and the Anglo-Japanese style. Emphasis on the originality of the artist/craftsman led to the later design concepts of the 1930s Art Deco movement. The architect and designer Frank Lloyd Wright, himself a member of the Chicago Arts and Crafts Society, was inspired by the style to become an innovator in the Prairie School of architecture and design, which shared many common goals with the Arts and Crafts movement.

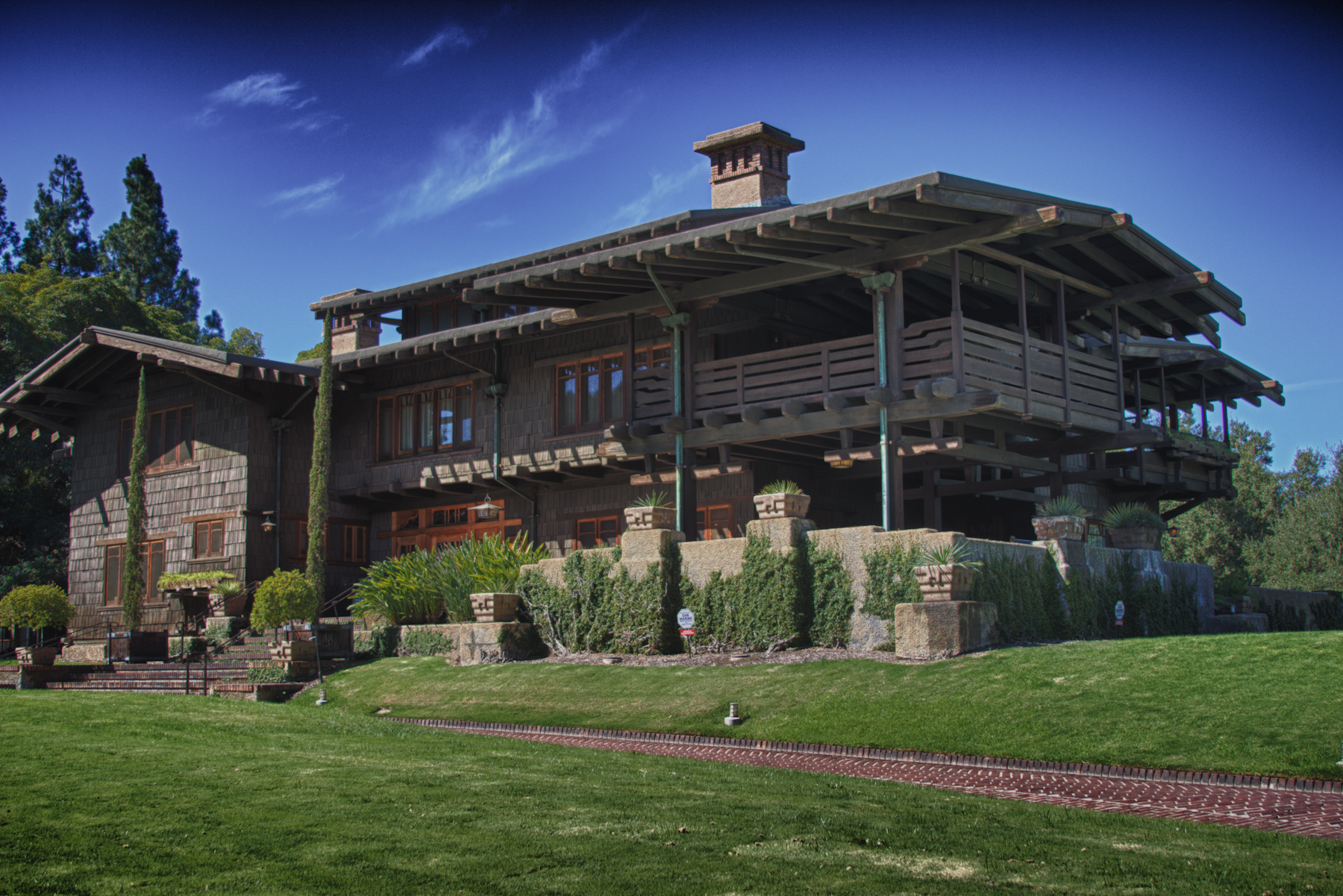
The Gamble House, an iconic American Arts and Crafts design by Greene & Greene in Pasadena, California, built between 1908 and 1909

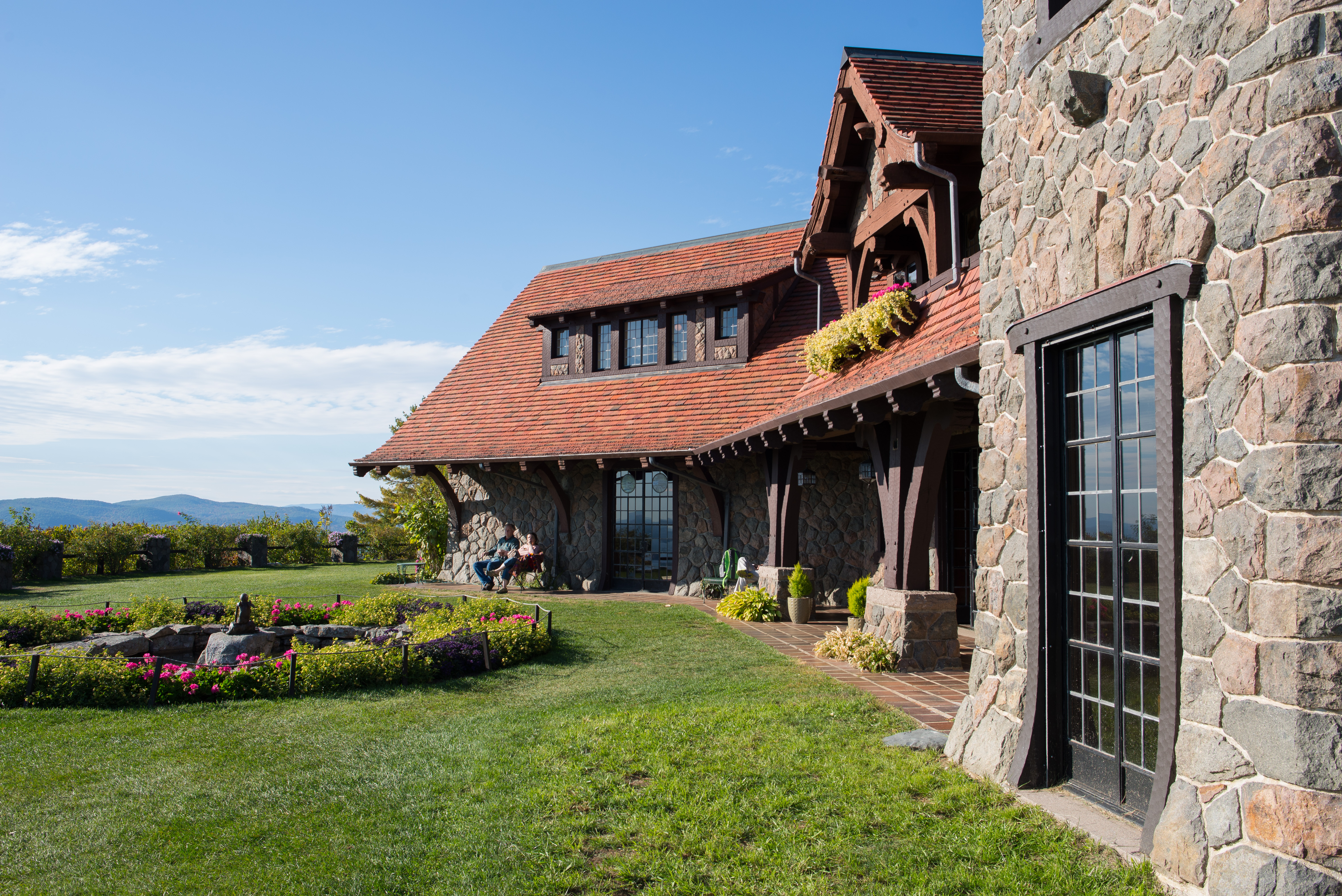
Facade of the Castle in the Clouds and lawn overlooking Lake Winnipesaukee in New Hampshire, built 1913–1914

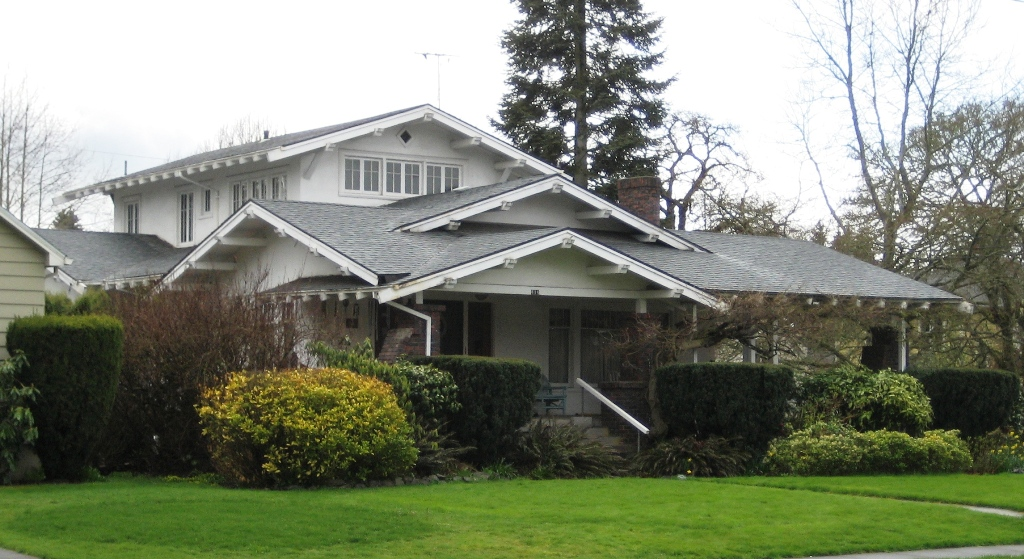
The Edward Schulmerich House in Hillsboro, Oregon, completed in 1915

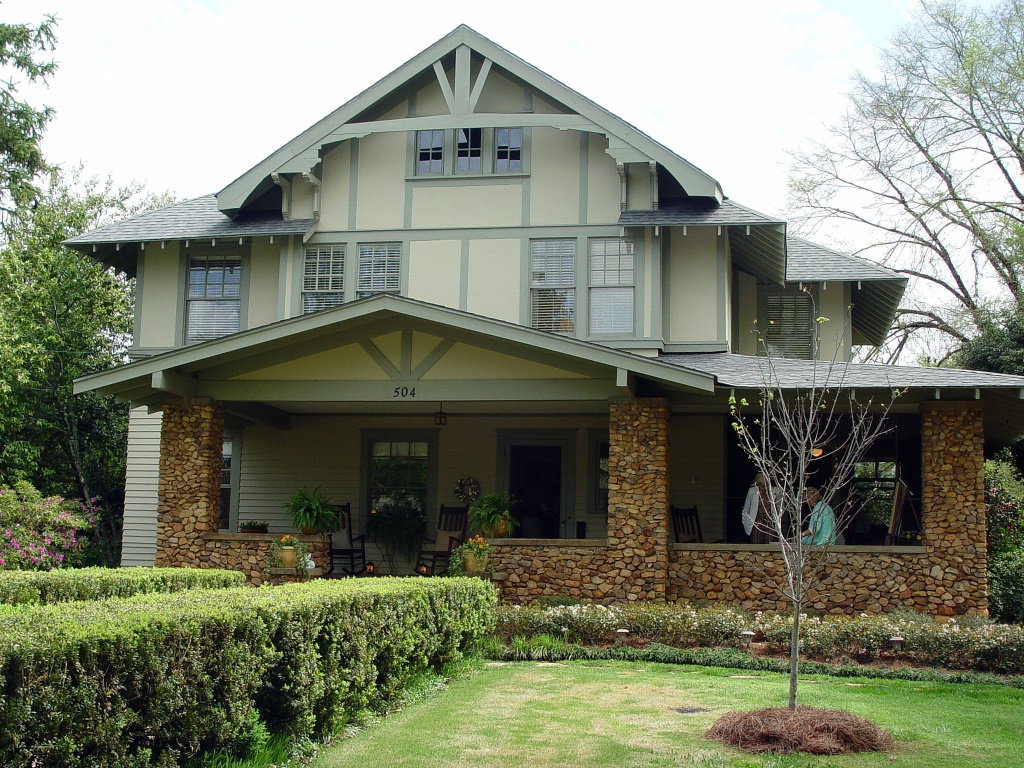
The Abernathy-Shaw House in the Silk Stocking District of Talladega, Alabama, built in 1908

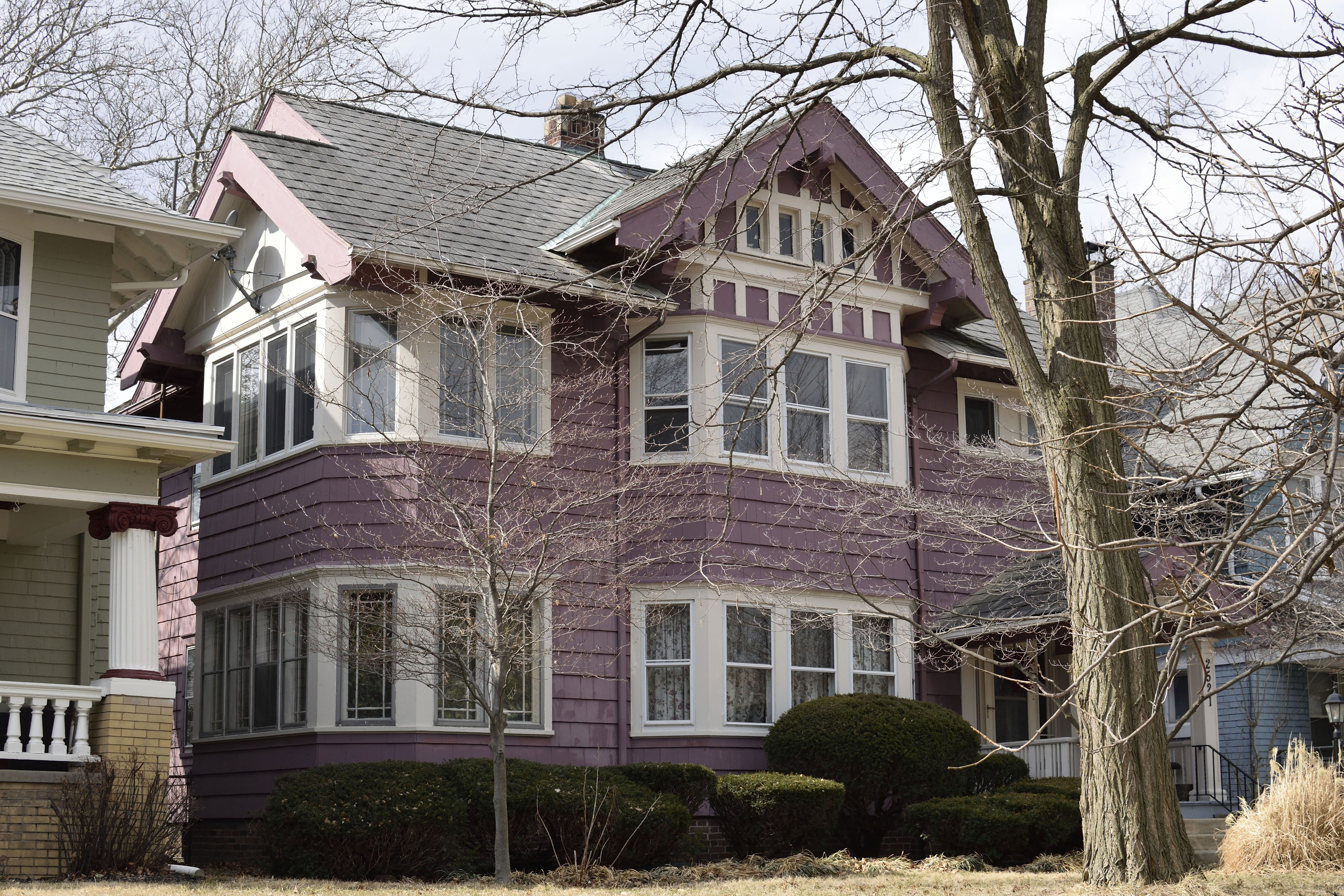
F. E. Cottrell Apartment Building in the Old West End District of Toledo, Ohio, built 1914–1915

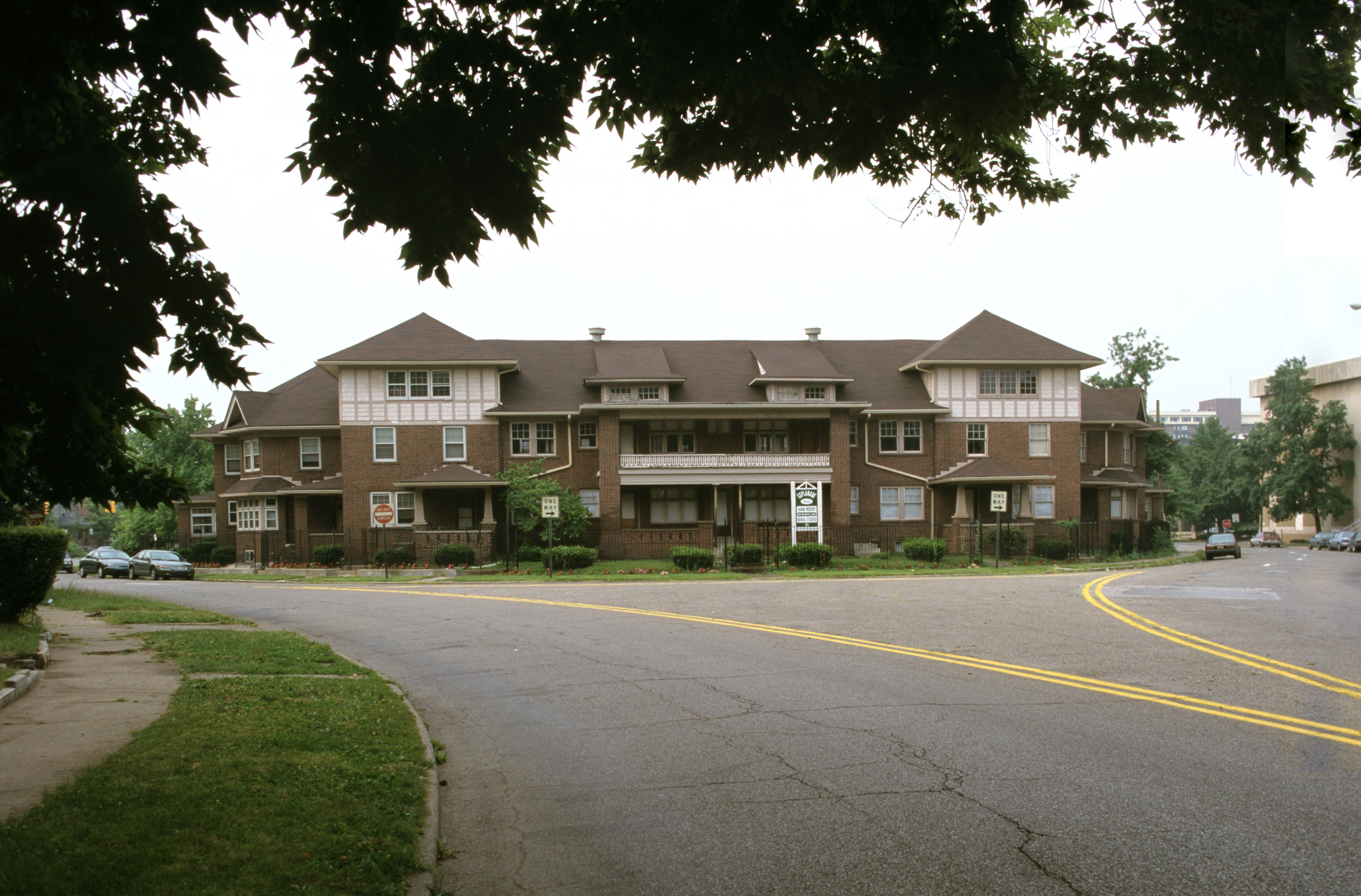
Esplanade Apartments, 3015 North Pennsylvania Street, 1998, in Indianapolis, Indiana, built in 1912

== The Boston Society of Arts and Crafts ==
The Arts and Crafts Movement emerged in the United States in Boston in the 1890s. The area was very receptive to the ideas of the Arts and Crafts movement due to prominent thinkers like the transcendentalist Ralph Waldo Emerson and Harvard art history professor Charles Eliot Norton, who was a personal friend of British Art and Crafts leader William Morris. The movement began with the first American Arts and Crafts Exhibition organized by the printer Henry Lewis Johnson in April 1897 at Copley Hall, featuring over 1,000 objects made by designers and craftspeople.

The exhibition's success led to the formation of the Boston Society of Arts and Crafts in June 1897 with Charles Eliot Norton as president. The society aimed to "develop and encourage higher standards in the handicrafts." The Society focused on the relationship of artists and designers to the world of commerce and high-quality craft.

The Society of Arts and Crafts mandate was soon expanded into a credo that read:

This Society was incorporated for the purpose of promoting artistic work in all branches of handicraft. It hopes to bring Designers and Workmen into mutually helpful relations, and to encourage workmen to execute designs of their own. It endeavors to stimulate in workmen an appreciation of the dignity and value of good design; to counteract the popular impatience of Law and Form, and the desire for over-ornamentation and specious originality. It will insist upon the necessity of sobriety and restraint, of ordered arrangement, of due regard for the relation between the form of an object and its use, and of harmony and fitness in the decoration put upon it.

The society held its first exhibition in 1899 at Copley Hall.

== Notable Craftsman designers ==
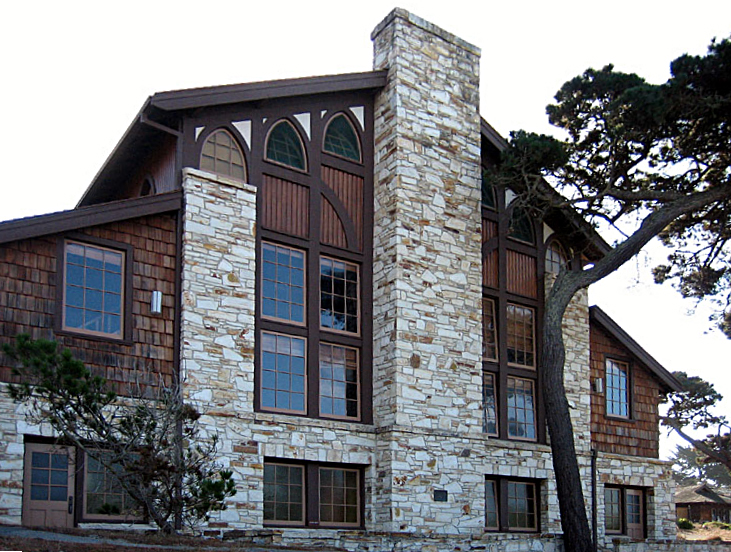
Merrill Hall at the Asilomar Conference Grounds in Pacific Grove, California, a Julia Morgan design completed in 1928

In Southern California, the Pasadena-based firm Greene and Greene was the most renowned practitioner of the original American Craftsman Style. Their projects for ultimate bungalows include the Gamble House and Robert R. Blacker House in Pasadena, and the Thorsen House in Berkeley, California—with numerous others in California. Other examples in the Los Angeles region include the Arts and Crafts Lummis House by Theodore Eisen and Sumner P. Hunt, along the Arroyo Seco in Highland Park, California, and the Journey House, located in Pasadena. The Gamble House is considered to be the largest Craftsman style house made.

The Tifal brothers were also notable southern California American Craftsman architects, having designed more than 350 homes in Los Angeles and 100 in Monrovia in the style.

In Northern California, architects renowned for their well-planned and detailed projects in the Craftsman style include Bernard Maybeck, with the Swedenborgian Church, and Julia Morgan, with the Asilomar Conference Grounds and Mills College projects. Many other designers and projects represent the style in the region.

In San Diego, California, the style was also popular. Architect David Owen Dryden designed and built many Craftsman California bungalows in the North Park district, now a proposed Dryden Historic District. The 1905 Marston House of George Marston in Balboa Park was designed by local architects Irving Gill and William Hebbard.

In the early 1900s, developer Herbert J. Hapgood built several Craftsman-style homes, many from stucco, that comprise the lakeside borough of Mountain Lakes, New Jersey. Residents were called "Lakers." The homes followed signature styles, including bungalows and chalets. Hapgood eventually went bankrupt.

In Rose Valley, Pennsylvania, architect William Lightfoot Price made significant contributions to the Arts & Crafts Movement through his visionary designs and community planning. Inspired by the movement's ideals of craftsmanship and harmony with nature, Price transformed the former mill town into an artistic enclave, designing homes that blended organic materials, handcrafted details, and a commitment to aesthetic simplicity. His work in Rose Valley, including its thoughtfully designed cottages and communal spaces, embodied the movement's philosophy of integrating art into everyday life, making it a lasting example of the Arts & Crafts ideal in America.

The Castle in the Clouds, a mountaintop estate built in the Ossipee Mountains of New Hampshire between 1913 and 1914 for Thomas Gustave Plant by architect J. Williams Beal, is an example of the American Craftsman style in New England.

== Common architectural features ==
- Low-pitched roof lines, usually a gabled roof, occasionally a hip roof
- Deeply overhanging eaves
- Exposed rafters or decorative brackets under eaves
- Wide front porch beneath an extension of the main roof or front-facing gable
- Tapered, square columns supporting the porch roof
- 4-over-1 or 6-over-1 double-hung windows
- Shingle roofs and siding
- Handcrafted stone or woodwork
- Mixed materials throughout structure

== See also ==
- American Foursquare
- Bungalow
- California bungalow
- Mar del Plata style
