= Greene and Greene =

Architectural firm

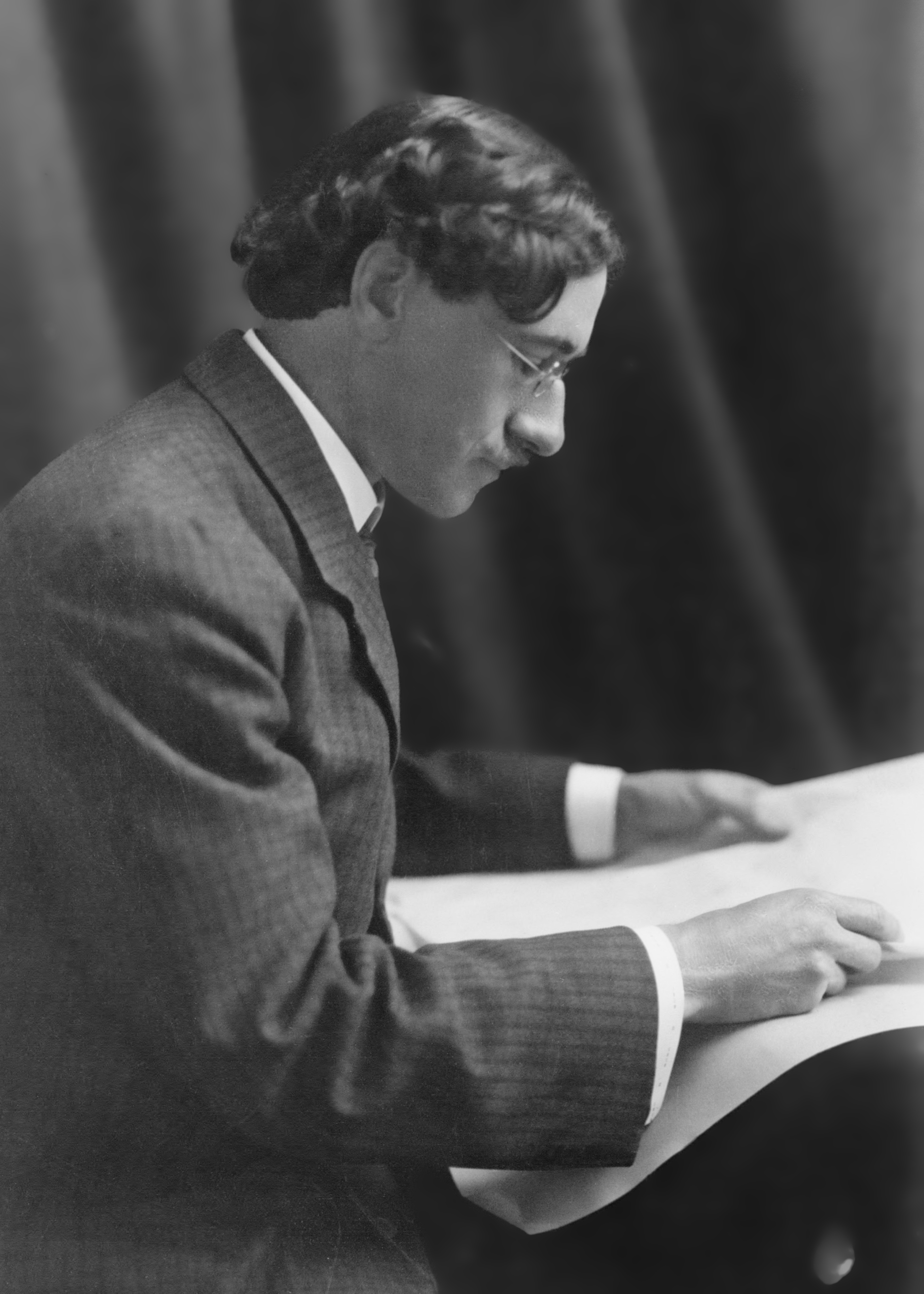
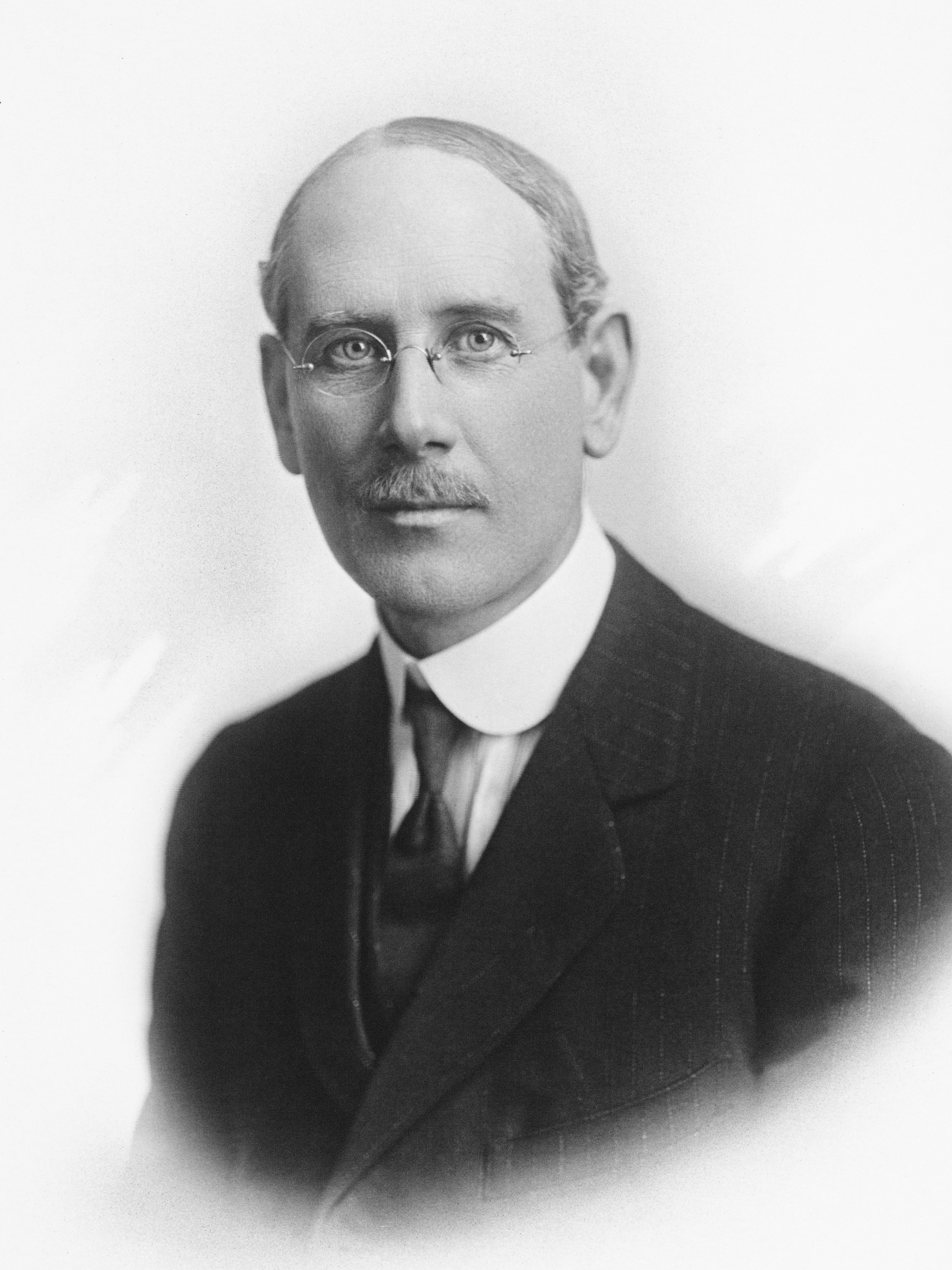
- Top: Charles Sumner Greene (1868–1957). Bottom: Henry Mather Greene (1870–1954)
- Industry: Architecture
- Founded: January 1894 in California, United States
- Founders: Charles Sumner Greene; Henry Mather Greene
- Defunct: 1922
- Headquarters: California, United States

Greene and Greene was an architectural firm established by brothers Charles Sumner Greene (1868–1957) and Henry Mather Greene (January 23, 1870 – October 2, 1954), influential early 20th century American architects. Active primarily in California, their houses and larger-scale ultimate bungalows are prime exemplars of the American Arts and Crafts Movement.

== Biographies ==
Charles Sumner and Henry Mather Greene were born in Brighton, Ohio, in 1868 and 1870, respectively. They grew up primarily in St. Louis, Missouri, and on their mother's family farm in West Virginia while their father attended medical school.

As teenagers, the brothers studied at the Manual Training School of Washington University in St. Louis, where they studied metal- and woodworking and graduated in 1887–1888. Their father, a practicing homeopathic physician by this time, was very concerned with the need for sunlight and circulating fresh air; the importance of these elements was to become one of the signatures of the brothers' work. Charles and Henry each received a "certificate for completion of partial course", a special two-year program at MIT's School of Architecture, in 1891. They studied classical building styles, only intending to gain certification for apprenticeships with architecture and construction firms upon graduation.

After MIT in spring 1890, Charles apprenticed first with the firm of Andrews, Jaques and Rantoul; but after four and a half months, moved to the office of R. Clipston Sturgis. By March 1891, he had moved again to work with Herbert Langford Warren; and by the following November, he had changed again to the firm of Winslow and Wetherell. He would stay there until the two brothers departed to join their parents in Pasadena, California. Henry apprenticed first with the firm of Chamberlin & Austin and then briefly went to work with Shepley, Rutan and Coolidge. All the firms the brothers worked for were located in Boston, Massachusetts.

In 1893 their parents requested that the sons move to Pasadena, where they had moved a year before. The brothers agreed and, while traveling by train from Boston, they stopped at the World's Columbian Exposition in Chicago and saw a few examples of Japanese architecture. This experience made a lasting impression on both of them, according to a late-in-life interview with Henry. There was actually very little Japanese influence upon their work until after Charles visited the 1904 Louisiana Purchase Exposition in St. Louis.

In 1901 Charles Greene married Alice Gordon White, and they honeymooned in Europe and her native England.

== Practice ==
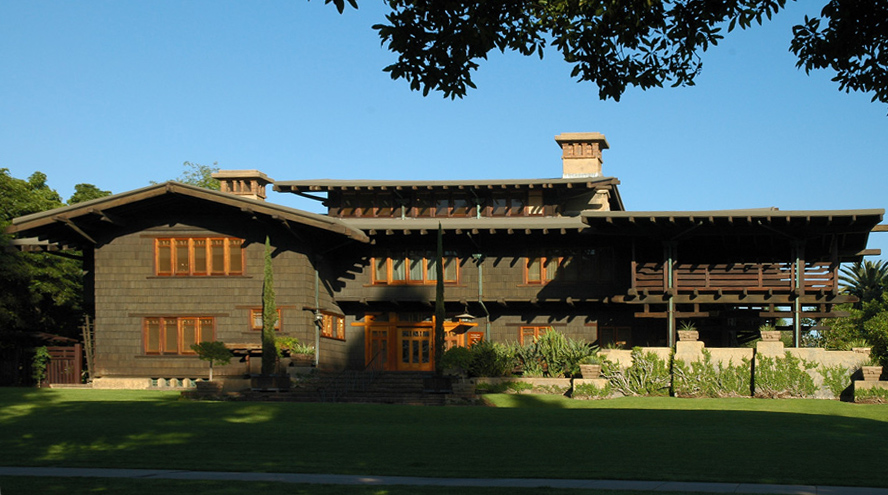
Gamble House, Pasadena, California, in 2005

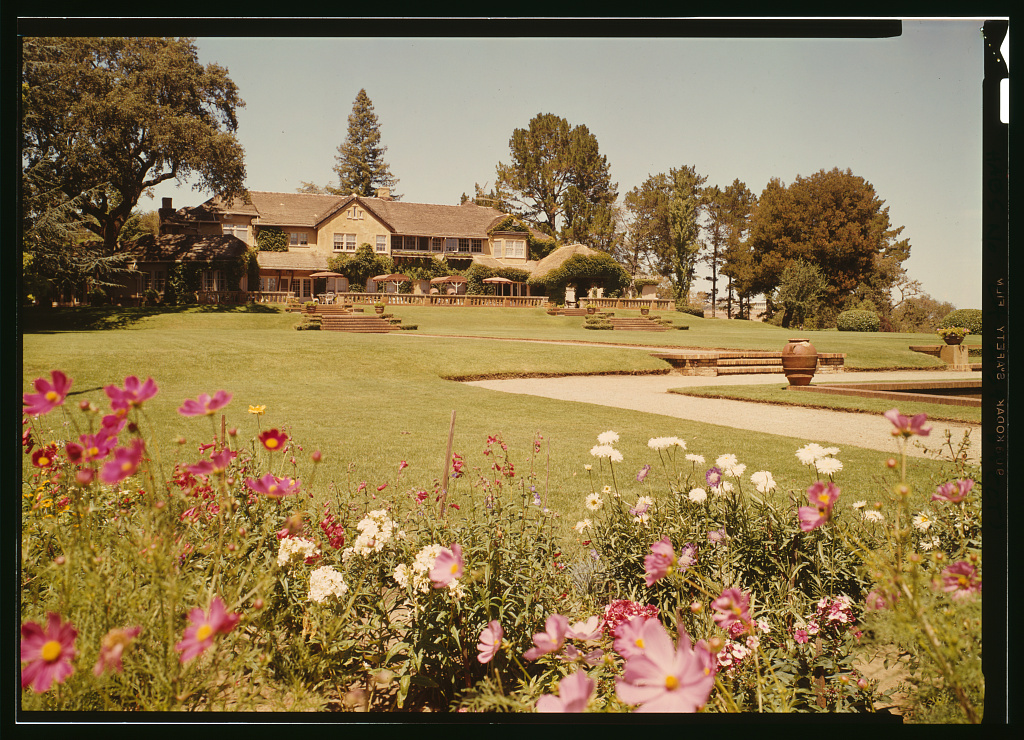
Mortimer Fleishhacker House and estate (rear view), Woodside, California

The architectural firm of Greene and Greene was established in Pasadena in January 1894, eventually culminating with the designs of their "ultimate bungalows", such as the 1908 Gamble House in Pasadena, generally considered one of the finest examples of residential architecture in the United States. In 1966, the Gamble family turned the house over to the city of Pasadena in a joint agreement with the University of Southern California (USC) School of Architecture. The Gamble House was declared a National Historic Landmark in 1977.

Two other landmark ultimate bungalows were the Robert R. Blacker House in Pasadena and the Thorsen House. Such ultimate bungalows were completely custom affairs, where the vast majority of elements—light fixtures, furniture, even woven textiles—were created for specific spaces in the home.

After 1901 the firm began developing the distinctive stylistic elements that finally came together as a cohesive whole in their grand works of 1907–1909. The Greenes developed a personal idiom within the Arts and Crafts aesthetic, receiving commissions to design furnishings for their houses. Charles' sketches for the 1903 Mary Darling house were published in England in Academy Architecture the same year, representing the first foreign publication of the firm's work.

In 1905 the Greenes began an association with Peter Hall as the primary contractor for their major commissions, and from 1907 with his brother John Hall, who ran a millwork shop producing their decorative arts and furniture designs.

In 1911, the Greenes worked on one of their largest designs, the Mortimer Fleishhacker House and estate in Woodside, California.

=== A structural explosion ===
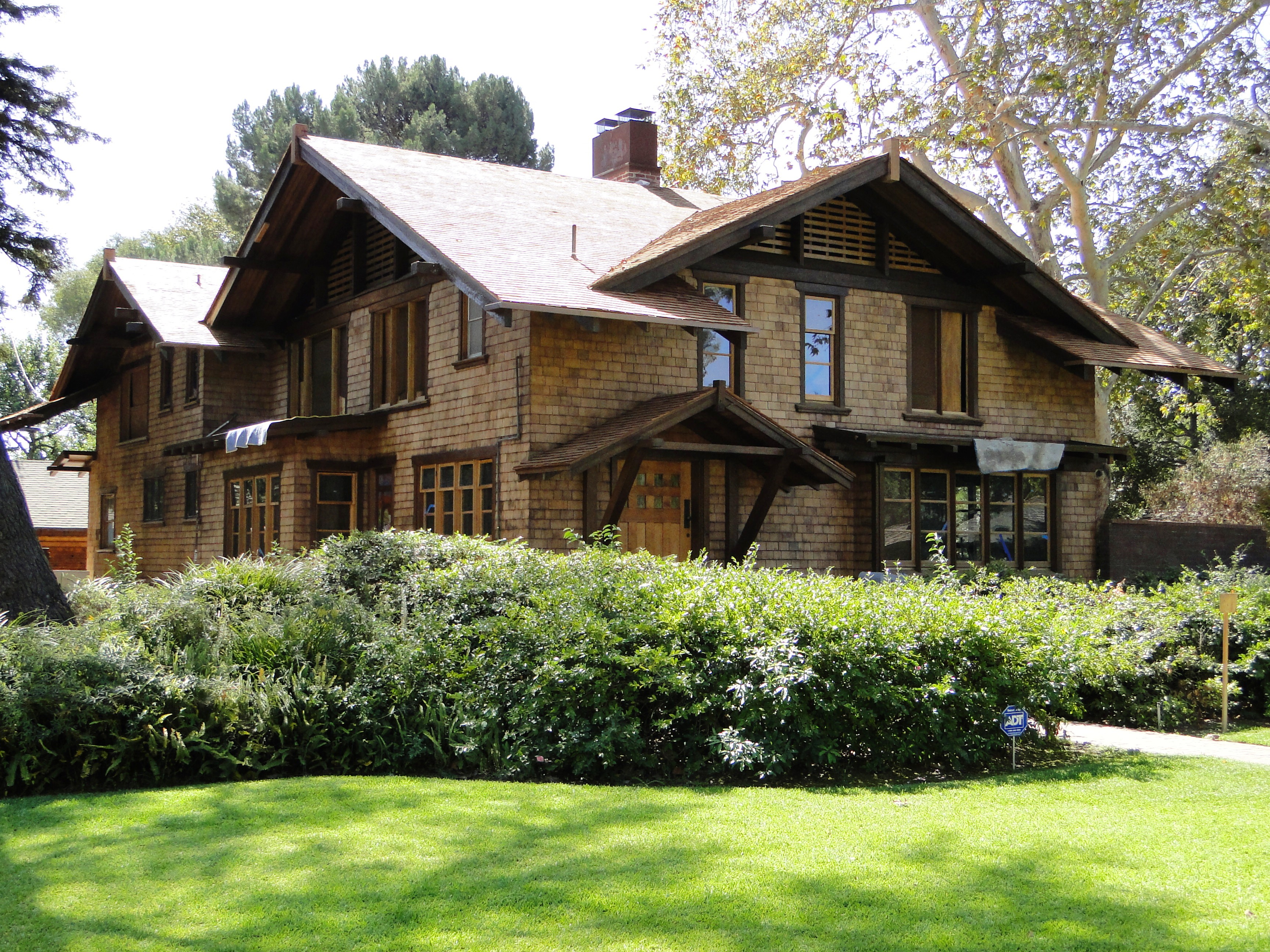
Jennie A. Reeve House, Los Cerritos, Long Beach, California

The structure of the Greene & Greene house is essential not only to the immense feeling of security that such an overly supported structure brings; it also accentuates the importance of the Arts and Crafts fundamentals in the Greene & Greene style. The visual importance of the aesthetic nature of the joints, pegs, and complex woodwork symbolizes the structure of the house, and coincides with the principles taught in the Manual Training School of their youth. The structure of the house is externalized, or exploded, rather than hidden in decoration. Each element of the structure asserts itself. This extravagance of support takes its origins from the elaborate joinery and framing of traditional Japanese architecture.

=== Obscurity and rediscovery ===
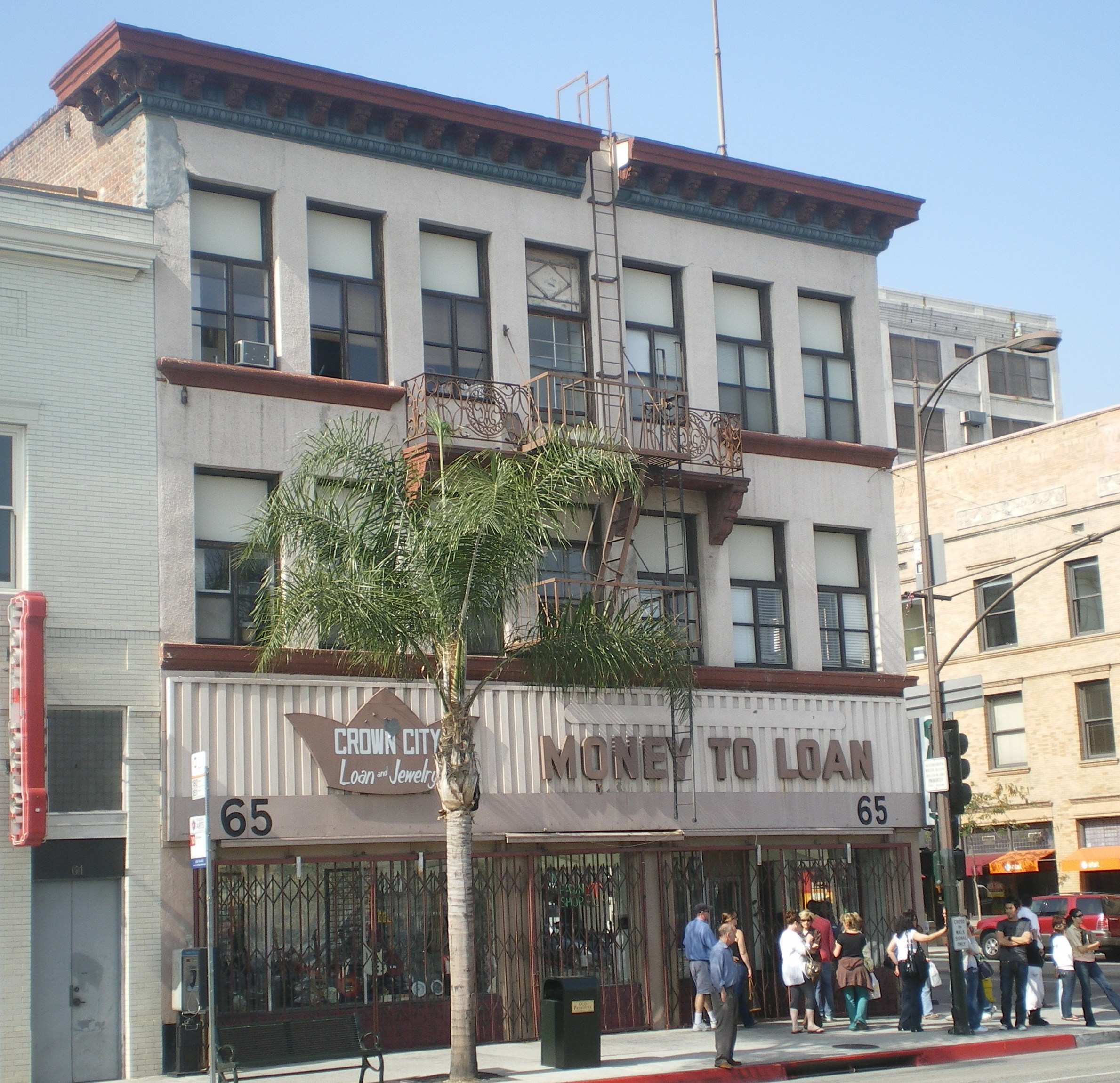
Shop in old Pasadena is the only surviving commercial building by Greene and Greene.

The Greenes took on few commercial projects. Their attention to detail would not have been possible in a larger firm, or one that focused on commercial buildings as well as residential. The Greenes repeatedly turned down offers to construct buildings in downtown Los Angeles. The Greene brothers were masters in their area of domestic concentration for which, until the year of 1948, they received little acclaim. In 1948 they received citations from the Pasadena Chapter of the American Institute of Architects and from the national body in 1952 for creating a “new and native architecture.” In 1960, they were among the modern architects included in the book Five California Architects by Esther McCoy, where the chapter on the Greenes was written by Randell L. Makinson.

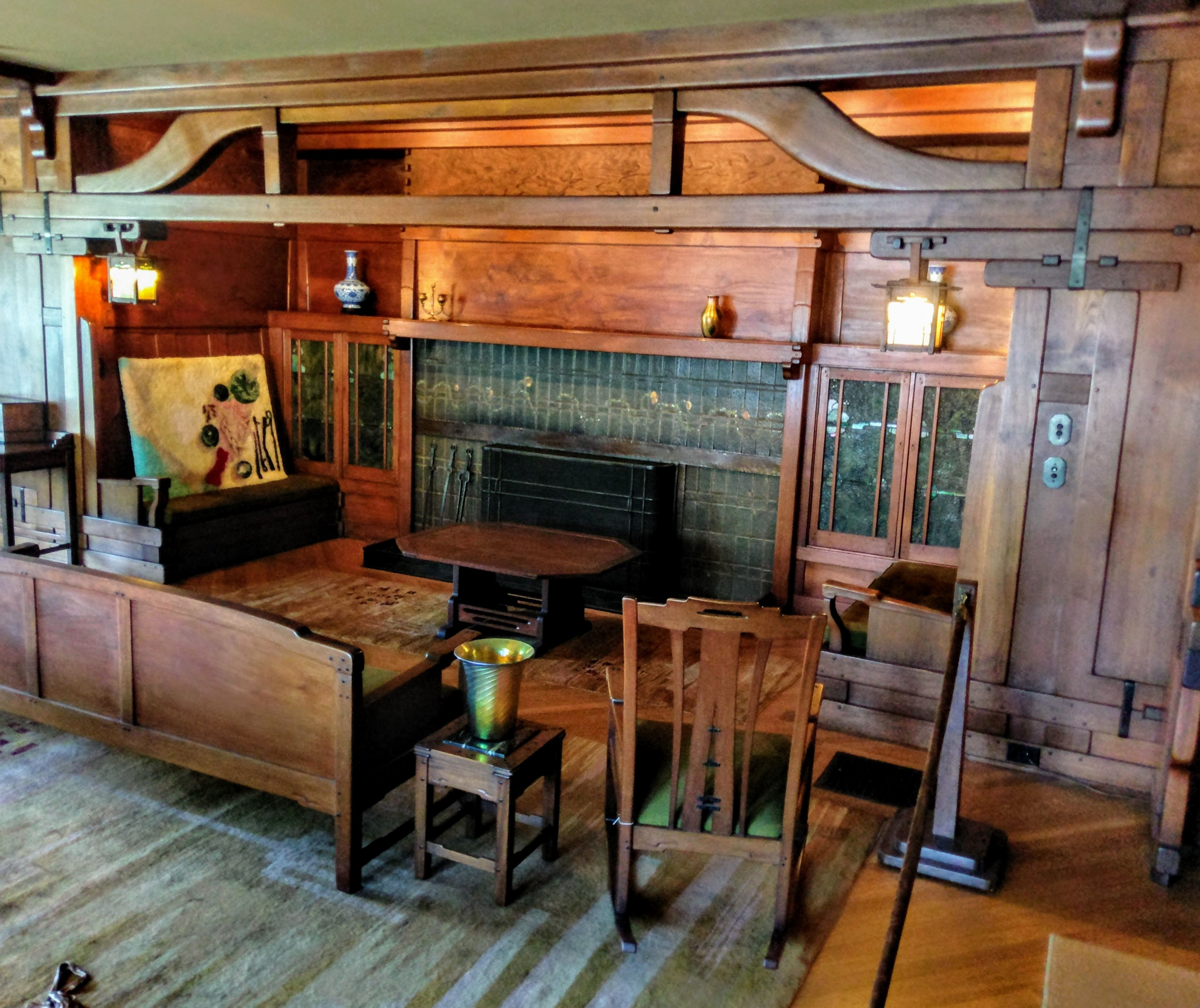
Examples of cloud lifts Gamble House (Pasadena, California) Picture from Cullen328

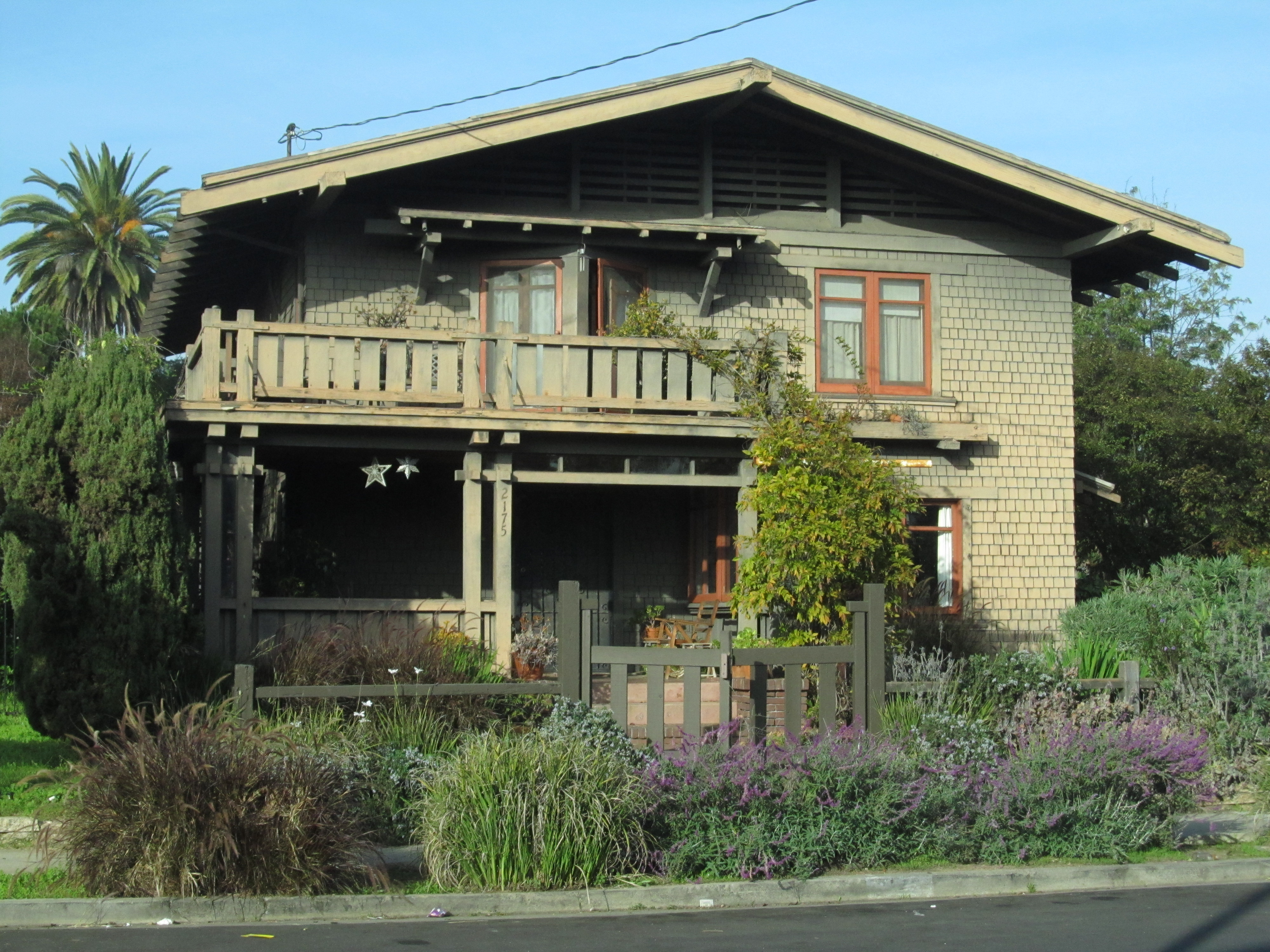
The Lucy E. Wheeler/Martin E. Weil House, the last remaining Greene & Greene House in Los Angeles.

=== Chinese and Japanese Influences ===
The Greene brothers’ first impression of Japanese Architecture came during their relocation to Pasadena, California; on their westward journey, the brothers attended the World's Columbian Exposition in Chicago. On display were formal works of the Japanese government in the form of the Ho-o-den exhibit, a scale replica of a temple in Uji, Japan. The half-scale replica of the Ho-o-den of Byōdō-in provided an exemplary showcase of Japanese architecture. One year later, intrigued by the exhibit in Chicago, the Greene brothers visited the Japanese hill and water gardens at an exposition in San Francisco. The influence of Japanese design began appearing in their projects after Charles Greene's visit to St. Louis in 1904 where he attended the Louisiana Purchase Exposition.

Dougong, one of the many building techniques on display at the expositions, is a building practice of interlocking wooden beams, showing exposed joinery which, when painted, acted as ornament. Dougong also has the practical application of protection from earthquakes, as the elasticity of multiple dougong has the ability to withstand seismic forces. These wooden brackets, often seen on the edges of roofing, are responsible for giving traditional Japanese buildings their signature look.

Another technique derived from Japanese influence is the "cloud lift", an aesthetic derived from Chinese furniture which was often treated as small-scale architecture. A cloud lift is subtle elevation of a straight line for aesthetic purposes, and was used in many of their works. The cloud lift is very prevalent in homes designed by the Greene brothers such as the Blacker House, Ranney House, and the Thorsen House as well as the Gamble House. The Gamble House uses the technique the most, with cloud lifts on the windows, walls, cabinetry, chairs, doors, fireplace, and even multiple examples in the light fixtures.

=== Closure ===
The firm of Greene & Greene was officially dissolved in 1922 after Charles moved his family north to Carmel-by-the-Sea, California in 1916, at age 48. Henry remained in Pasadena, doing architecture projects on his own.

Charles continued to do additions for various clients, including playwright Martin Flavin and Mortimer Fleishacker. Charles was a student of Japanese architecture and in his later years studied Buddhism.

==== D. L. James House ====
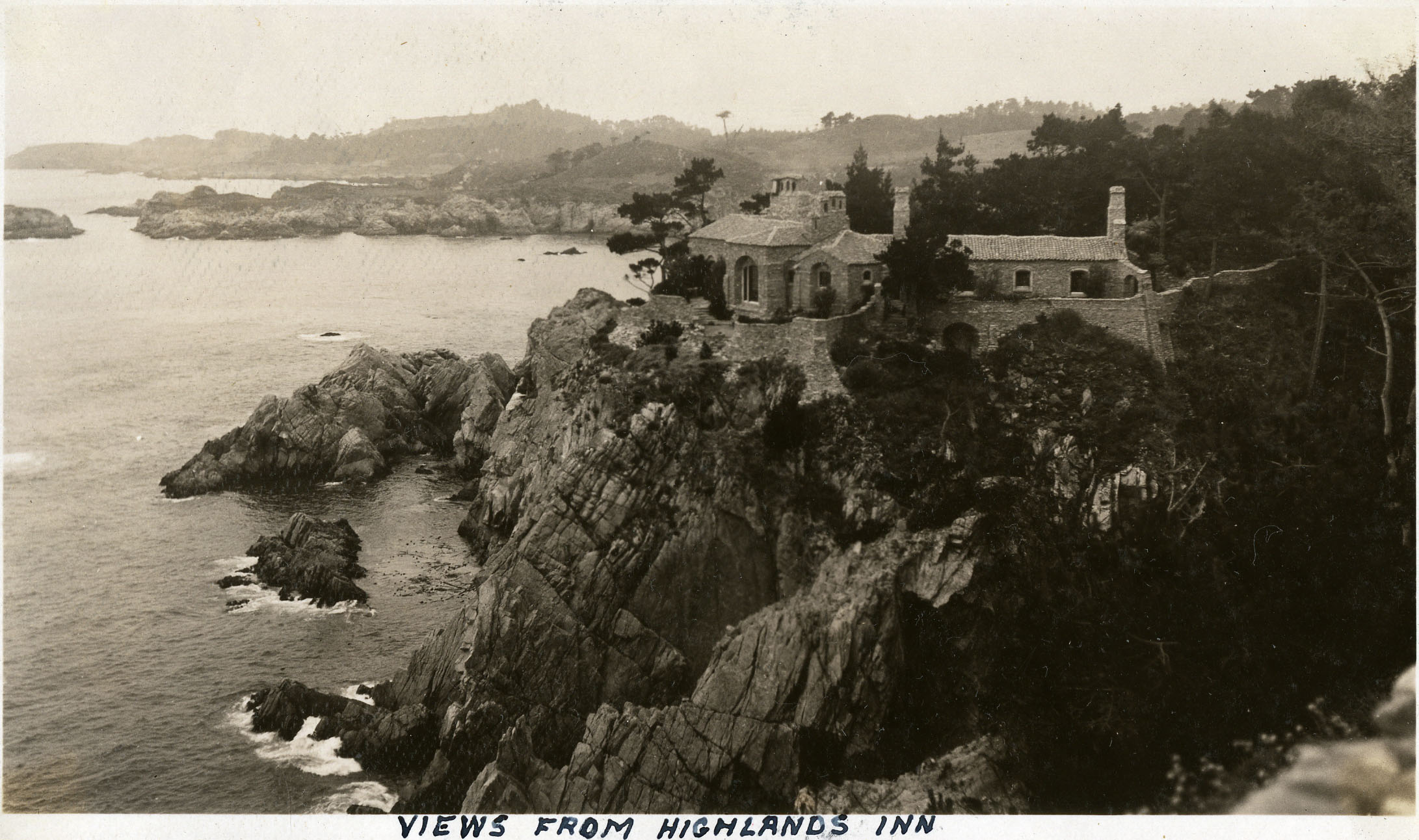
Seaward, the Carmel Highlands home of Daniel L. James

In 1918, businessman D.L. James (father of writer Daniel Lewis James) commissioned Charles to design a sandstone and granite Mediterranean-style house on a bluff he had bought in Carmel Highlands, California overlooking the water. Charles made watercolor sketches and architectural drawings for the house based on Cornwall's Tintagel Castle.

Greene supervised the construction of the granite house, which took five years to complete. The house was later called "Seaward". The house was sold in 1999 to Searock LLC for $4,590,000 (equivalent to $8,871,005 in 2025).

In July, 2022 the house was purchased from Searock by actor Brad Pitt for $40,000,000.

==== World War I Memorial Arch ====
The Carmel-by-the-Sea World War I Memorial Arch was designed by Charles Greene in 1919 and constructed at the intersection of Ocean Avenue and San Carlos Street. The design generally resembles a bell tower of a California mission, the arch made of stone. A bronze bell was added in 1996 after Greene's death, which is suspended from a timber beam almost certainly carved by Charles Greene.

==== Charles S. Greene House and Studio ====
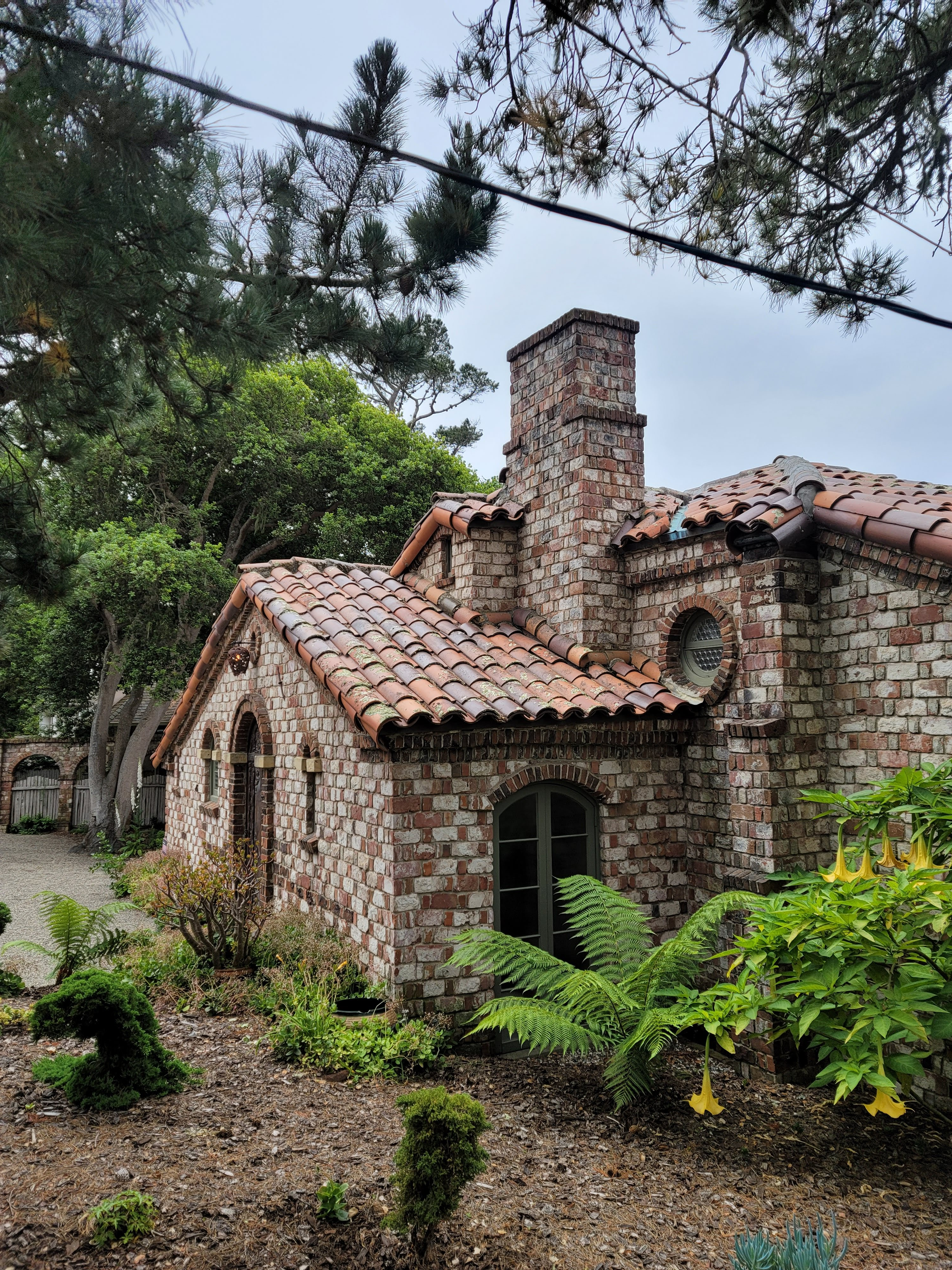
Charles Sumner Greene's Studio, Carmel-By-The-Sea

In 1923, Charles built the Charles S. Greene House and Studio, an American Craftsman-style home and studio on Lincoln Street south of 13th Avenue in Carmel. Materials included used brick from a demolished hotel in nearby Pacific Grove. He also used roof tiles left over from the James House project. The exterior walls of the studio are set in a modified Flemish cross bond with stylized interior carvings.

The arched teak front door is held in by a frame of brickwork. The windows are arched bottle-glass openings. The walls are colored with a mixture of sand combined into the plaster, as was done in the James House. Charles added patterns to the plaster from handmade woodblock stamps in the shape of flowers, leaves, and shells.

Charles used the studio as his personal workspace until his death in 1957. In 1965, it was saved from possible demolition by his children. The Charles Sumner Greene Studio is listed on the Carmel Inventory Of Historic Resources.

== Death ==
Charles Greene died on June 11, 1957, at age 89, in Carmel-by-the-Sea, California. Henry Greene, at age 84, died on October 2, 1954, in Los Angeles, California.

== See also ==
- Robert R. Blacker House
- Gamble House
- Thomas Gould Jr. House
- Thorsen House
- Spinks House
- Darrell Peart, "Greene and Greene" style furniture maker and designer

== Publications ==
- Bosley, Edward. Greene and Greene. ISBN 0-7148-3950-7
- Images of The Gamble House - Masterwork of Greene & Greene, Jeanette Thomas, Univ. of So. Calif. 1989, ISBN 0-9622296-1-X
- Makinson, Randell. "Greene & Greene: Architecture as a Fine Art" Gibbs Smith, Publisher, Salt Lake City, Utah, 284 pages, 1977 ISBN 0-87905-023-3
- Makinson, Randell L., Heinz, Thomas A.. Greene and Greene: Creating a Style. Gibbs Smith, Publisher, Salt Lake City, Utah 96 pages, 2004 ISBN 1-58685-116-0
- Makinson, Randell L., "Greene & Greene: Furniture and Related Designs" Gibbs Smith, Publisher, Salt Lake City, Utah, 162 pages, 1979 ISBN 0-87905-060-8
- Makinson, Randell L., Heinz, Thomas A., Pitt, Brad; Greene & Greene: The Blacker House; 2000; Gibbs Smith Publisher, Salt Lake City, Utah,132 pages. ISBN 0-87905-949-4
- Makinson, Randell, L.. "Greene & Greene: The Passion and the Legacy" Gibbs Smith, Publisher, Salt Lake City, Utah, 232 pages, 1998 ISBN 0-87905-847-1
- Smith, Bruce R. Greene & Greene Masterworks. ISBN 0-8118-1878-0
- Smith, Bruce R. & Vertikoff, Alexander. Greene & Greene: Master Builders of the American Arts & Crafts Movement. ISBN 0-500-34165-6
- Thorne-Thomsen, Kathleen, "Greene & Greene for Kids" Gibbs Smith, Publisher, Salt Lake City, Utah, 112 pages, 2004, ISBN 1-58685-440-2
