= Robert R. Blacker House =

Historic house in California, United States

- U.S. National Register of Historic Places
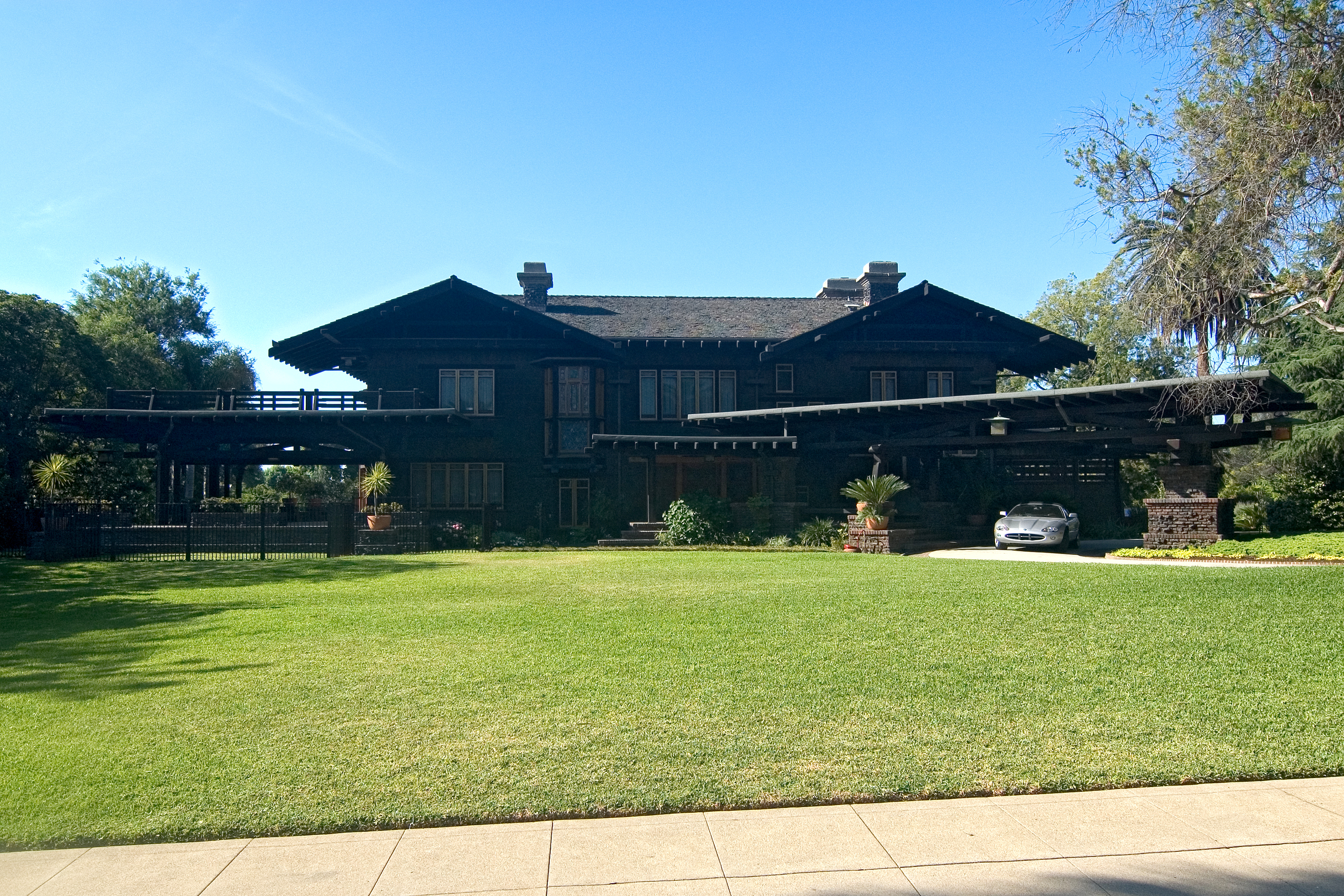
- Robert R. Blacker House (Greene & Greene 1907)
- Location: 1177 Hillcrest Ave; Pasadena, California
- Coordinates: 34°7′37″N 118°7′58″W
- Architect: Charles & Henry Greene
- Architectural style: Bungalow/Craftsman
- NRHP reference No.: 86000147
- Added to NRHP: February 6, 1986

The Robert Roe Blacker House, often referred to as the Blacker House or Robert R. Blacker House, is a residence in Pasadena, California, United States, which is now on the U.S. National Register of Historic Places. It was built in 1907 for Robert Roe Blacker and Nellie Canfield Blacker. It was designed by Henry and Charles Greene of the renowned Pasadena firm of Greene and Greene. This house was a lavish project for the Greene brothers, costing in excess of US$100,000.00 ($3.46 million today). Everything for the house was custom designed, down to the teak escutcheon plates of the upstairs mahogany panel doors to the linen closets with their ebony cloud adorned keys.

== Robert & Nellie Canfield Blacker ==
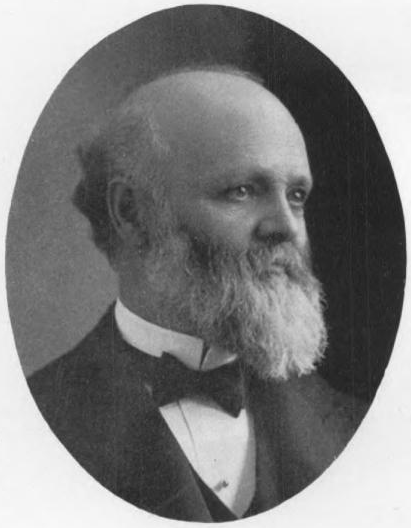
Robert R. Blacker

Robert R. Blacker (1845–1931) was a retired Michigan lumberman. Nellie Canfield Blacker was the daughter of John Canfield, owner-operator of Canfield & Wheeler, a lumber mill based in Manistee, Michigan. Blacker was a member of several lumbering firms in Manistee, including R.R. Blacker & Company; Davies, Blacker & Company and the State Lumber Company. Among other interests, he was also president of the Michigan Steamship Company, original owners of the ill-fated SS Eastland.

Robert Blacker preceded his wife in death in 1931. Upon Nellie's death in 1946, the property went into probate as the Blackers did not identify any heirs. In her Last Will and Testament, Nellie specified the house, land, and its furnishings were to be sold as a whole and not parceled off.

Unfortunately, the representative of Nellie Blacker's estate decided to maximize the value of the assets instead. As a result, the seven acres (2.8 hectares) estate was sold without its furnishings, then subdivided by the purchaser into smaller parcels, destroying the gardens in the process. The main residence ended up on just one acre (0.40 hectares). The garage became a separate residence, as did the caretaker's cottage. The remainder of the gardens were subdivided into separate lots.

More notable, though, was the infamous "yard sale" conducted shortly after the sale in probate where the furnishing were sold off, in a yard sale fashion. Furniture built for the Blacker House is now in museums and in the hands of wealthy collectors and Hollywood luminaries. One family, the Andersons, lived down the street and were able to buy a large lot of furniture. In 1990, an Anderson family member offered the then-owners of the Blacker House the ability to purchase the breakfast room table for the remarkable sum of $390,000.00; the table was later sold at auction for approximately $70,000. On 19 June 2007, the following Greene and Greene items; living room chair, bedroom chair, and bedroom andirons were sold at Sotheby's fetching prices, including Buyer's premium and New York sales tax, of $913,600, $396,000, and $66,000 respectively.

== Partial dismantling ==
The house was purchased by Mr. and Mrs. Max Hill in the 1950s. In 1985, recently widowed, Mrs. Hill sold the property to Barton English, a Princeton graduate and rancher from Texas, and Michael Carey, a prominent dealer of Arts and Crafts era antiques from New York City. Shortly after the close of escrow, Mr. English hired a well known local antique dealer to remove more than forty-eight original lighting fixtures for him. Later, he also removed some of the leaded art glass doors, windows, and transom panels, after commissioning a well known local studio to produce exact reproductions of the doors and windows that were to be removed. Many of the original pieces were sold on the art market. This incident has been referred to as the "Rape of the Blacker House".

National media attention to this sequence of events was facilitated through the efforts of Pasadena Heritage executive director Claire Bogaard. Articles appeared in the Los Angeles Times, The Washington Post and The New York Times. Pasadena enacted an emergency ordinance, known as the Blacker Ordinance, which attempted to limit the ability of people owning homes designed by Greene and Greene to dismantle or otherwise destroy artifacts therein. Although not a direct prohibition, the ordinance delayed for up to one year any changes or alterations, subject to review of a committee of the Planning Commission. Conservation-minded citizens guarded the Blacker house day and night to keep further fixtures from being removed.

Several of the chandeliers sold for approximately $250,000 and many of the lamps fetched $100,000 each. As Mr. English paid only $1 million for the home, he quickly recouped his investment on the sale of the fixtures. He sold the home in 1988, for $1.2 million, having never lived in it.

== Restoration ==
When the home was offered for sale in 1994 it was purchased by Harvey and Ellen Knell. At the time the couple were in escrow on another Greene and Greene house, however, they backed out of that purchase in order to obtain the Blacker house.

The Knells worked with Randall Makinson, a restoration architect with a specialty in Greene and Greene, and James Ipekjian, a master craftsman, along with an entire team of like minded mastercraftsmen that were specialists in their fields. The building was restored inside and out. Ipekjian was responsible for re-creating the wood work of the lamps and other fixtures; he even traveled to see one of the original pieces in order to make a correct copy. The house was entirely re-wired and re-plumbed, the structure upgraded to withstand earthquakes, and discreet ventilation ducts were installed. Every shingle was removed and either restored or replaced, all timbers were stripped and refinished, and nearly all the tail rafters cantilevering beyond the roof line needed to be replaced. After four years of restoration, a benefit dinner hosted by actor Brad Pitt celebrated the completion of the project.

== In popular culture ==
In the movie Back to the Future, interior shots of Doc Brown's house were taken inside the Blacker House; the exterior shots were of the Blacker House's "smaller brother", the Gamble House.

It is briefly seen in the 2005 film Rumor Has It.
