= Elizabeth A. Clark =

American scholar of religion (1938–2021)

Elizabeth Clark
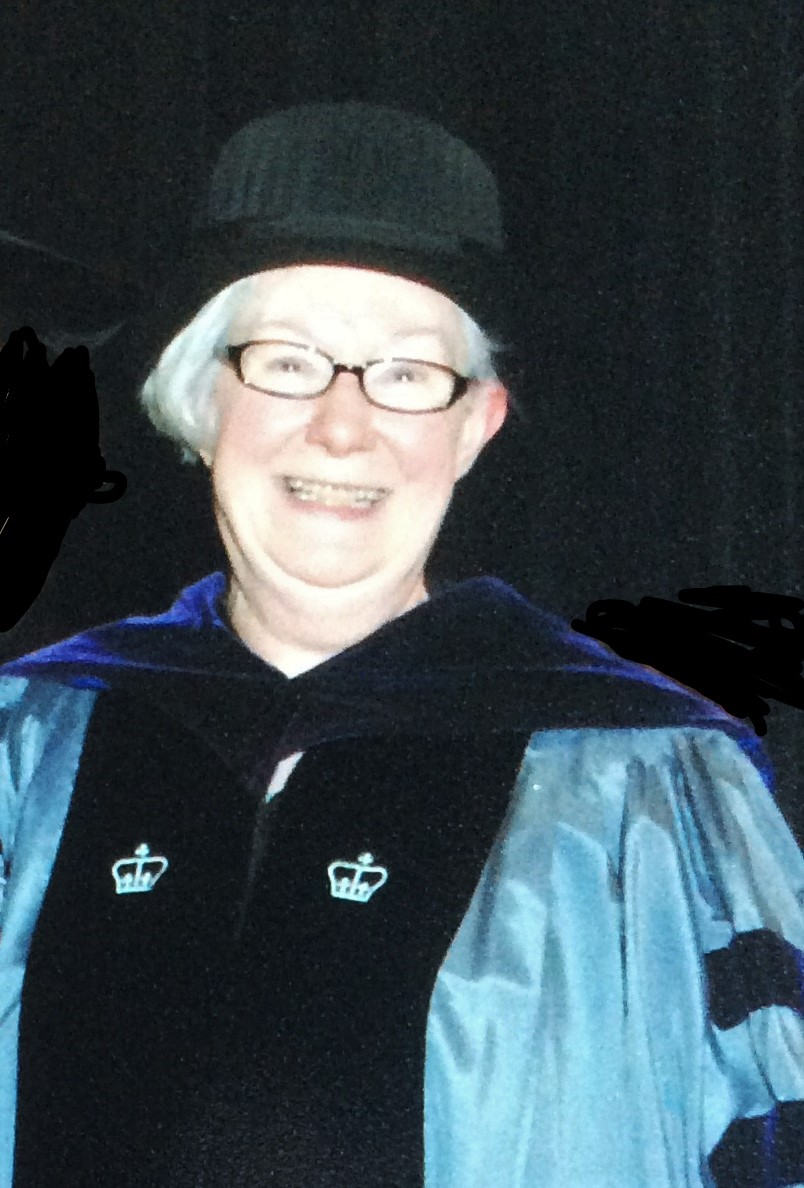
- Clark in 2007
- Born: September 27, 1938; Port Chester, New York, United States
- Died: September 7, 2021 (aged 82); Durham, North Carolina, United States
- Awards: Adèle Mellen Prize (1986); Guggenheim Fellowship (1988)

Academic background
- Education: Columbia University (PhD)
- Thesis: The influence of Aristotelian thought on Clement of Alexandria: a study in philosophical transmission (1964)

Academic work
- Discipline: Early Christianity
- Institutions: Duke University

Elizabeth Ann Clark (September 27, 1938 – September 7, 2021) was a professor of the John Carlisle Kilgo professorship of religion at Duke University. She was notable for her work in the field of Patristics, and the teaching of ancient Christianity in US higher education. Clark expanded the study of early Christianity and was a strong advocate for women, pioneering the application of modern theories such as feminist theory, social network theory, and literary criticism to ancient sources.

== Early life ==
Clark was born in Port Chester, New York, in 1938. She moved to Delhi, New York, when she was nine. She attended high school there and subsequently described her education in history as "dismal", but she always had her nose in a book. Clark and her sister were both encouraged to have a better college education and not attend the teachers' college in Delhi. She and her sister received state scholarships and attended Vassar College in 1958, which was single-sex at the time. Clark originally chose to major in Physiology, but after spending two and half years ' chopping up frogs, rats, turtles, and eventually cats, I decided that a career in this field did not inspire.' Clark received her AB in Religion in 1960. She was taught history by Mildred Campbell, Mary Martin McLaughlin, and J. B. Ross, and Religion by Jack Glasse. Whilst she was at Vassar, she attended chapel services to hear Reinhold Niebuhr and Paul Tillich. Her father did not allow her to study Greek in college, considering it “mere dilettantish frivolity”.

Clark received her MA and PhD from Columbia University in 1962 and 1965. She felt pressure to finish her training quickly and on the funding she had received; her stipend was smaller as, according to the Dean, the largest stipends had to be reserved for married men with children. As a graduate student, Clark studied Early Christianity alongside philosophy, including a course run by Paul Kristeller on Hellenic philosophy after Aristotle. She was also taught by Susan Sontag, who was writing her own doctoral thesis at the time. Clark described Kristeller as "the most learned scholar I have ever known". He co-chaired Clark's dissertation committee, on the proviso that she would read the evidence in the original Greek. Clark's doctoral thesis was The Influence of Aristotelian Thought on Clement of Alexandria: A Study in Philosophical Transmission, written under the direction of the faculty of Union Theological Seminary.

== Career ==
In 1964, Clark founded the Department of Religion at Mary Washington College (now part of the Department of Classics, Philosophy, and Religion at the University of Mary Washington) in Fredericksburg, Virginia. Clark participated in the women's liberation movement from the late 1960s, and cofounded the Fredricksburg chapter of the National Organisation for Women (NOW) around 1970.

Clark held the position of the Chair of the Department of Religion at Mary Washington College from 1964 until 1979. Her students included Patricia Cox Miller and Robin Darling Young. During this time, she protested against the Vietnam War. She was encouraged to publish her research by Herbert Richardson, who founded the Edwin Mellen Press. Richardson published her doctoral thesis as Clement’s Use of Aristotle: The Aristotelian Contribution to Clement of Alexandria’s Refutation of Gnosticism in 1977, which was the first work published by the Edwin Mellen Press. Clark would publish three of her books on women in early Christianity with the Press, and she remained deeply grateful to Richardson for his willingness to print books on women's history before the subject was popular. Clark noted that an editor at a major university press sent her a rejection letter with the advice “Now why don’t you write on hospitals - that’s an interesting topic.”

In 1982, Clark was appointed a Professor of Religion at Duke University, where she subsequently worked for forty years, supervising students including Blake Leyerle, Maureen Tilley and Kristi Upson-Saia. She founded the Center for Late Ancient Studies at Duke in 1986. At the time of her appointment in the College of Arts and Sciences, the faculty numbered around 500; only four women held the rank of full professor.

Clark held a fellowship at the National Humanities Center, North Carolina from 2001–2002. Clark was awarded an honorary degree by Uppsala University in 2001. She was given the shell of the cannon that was fired during the ceremony as a memento. Clark received an honorary degree from Yale University in 2013. Clark has served on the boards of many academic journals, including Signs: Journal of Women in Culture and Society. She helped to launch and co-edited the Journal of Early Christian Studies. Clark was a prolific writer, authoring or editing thirteen books and over seventy articles. Her research has focused on Augustine, John Chrysostom, Origen, social networks, early ascetic practices, and women in the early church. Clark retired from Duke in 2014 as the John Carlisle Kilgo Professor. She remained on the board of the Center for Late Ancient Studies at Duke. Reflecting on her career, Clark observed that it was "rather eclectic": "I branched into byways as well as highways, stumbled into enterprises for which neither my background nor graduate school had prepared me."

== Recognition and awards ==
Clark has served as president of the American Academy of Religion (1990), the American Society of Church History (1987), and the North American Patristics Society (1989). She was responsible for launching the Journal of Early Christian Studies, a flagship journal in the field of Patristics, early Christianity, and late ancient studies. She was awarded a Guggenheim Fellowship in 1988. She has been the recipient of grants from the National Endowment for the Humanities and the American Council of Learned Societies. In 2003, she received the Distinguished Career Award from the American Society of Church History. In 2006, she was awarded the Distinguished Service Award of the North American Patristic Society.

Clark's critical influence is demonstrated in the two Festschriften published in her honor: the first, The Cultural Turn in Late Ancient Studies (2005) edited by Dale Martin and Patricia Miller; the second edited by C. M. Chin and Caroline Schroeder: Melania: Early Christianity through the Life of One Family (2017). In 2018, Duke University renamed the Center for Late Ancient Studies as the Elizabeth A. Clark Center for Late Ancient Studies, "in honor of Dr. Clark’s career and leadership in the field."

Clark has served as dissertation adviser for a number of leading scholars in the field. For her support of young scholars, especially her commitment to support women and others who have not traditionally been represented in the academy, Clark was awarded the Dean's award for Excellence in Mentoring.

Her most recent book, The Fathers Refounded, was described as "a truly brilliant book, massively researched, beautifully written, often witty, and rich with insight".

== Activism ==
Clark was involved with the women's movement from the late 1960s, co-founding the Fredericksburg chapter of National Organization for Women.

== Death ==
Clark died on 7 September 2021. Flags were lowered at Duke University as a result. Catherine Chin characterized Clark in her obituary:

'Liz’s own peculiarities, her personal history combining youthful Calvinism, uncompromising intelligence, dry wit, terrible shyness, radical activism on many fronts, and mid-twentieth-century New York’s intellectual and cultural dash, had the potential to create a new way of seeing and writing early Christian history. That is what she did, despite the fact that many scholars whose work in the field was a little less unusual did not like or respect it. She was not dissuaded by their disrespect and was usually unimpressed by their criticism. This was the kind of scholar she could be. She was magnificent and pugnacious; generous and demanding; creative, bold, scathing, gentle, unpredictable, and unlike anyone else. Her embrace of all these qualities through decades of work and writing and friendship was how, in the end, she lived up to her potential. She became herself.'

== Select bibliography ==
=== Books, translations, and edited volumes ===
- Clement's Use of Aristotle: The Aristotelian Contribution to Clement of Alexandria's Refutation of Gnosticism (Lewiston, New York: Edwin Mellen Press, 1977)
- The Golden Bough, The Oaken Cross: The Virgilian Cento of Faltonia Betitia Proba, translation and commentary co-authored with D. Hatch (Chicago: Scholars Press, 1981)
- Jerome, Chrysostom, and Friends: Essays and Translations (Lewiston, New York: Edwin Mellen Press, 1982)
- Women in the Early Church (Wilmington: M. Glazier, 1983)
- "Introduction", On Virginity; Against Remarriage, translated by S. R. Shore (Lewiston, New York: Edwin Mellen Press, 1983) vii-xlii
- The Life of Melania, the Younger: Introduction, Translation, and Commentary (Lewiston, New York: Edwin Mellen Press, 1984)
- Ascetic Piety and Women's Faith: Essays on Late Ancient Christianity (Lewiston, New York: Edwin Mellen Press, 1986)
- Sisters and Workers in the Middle Ages, co-edited with J. M. Bennett et al. (Chicago: University of Chicago Press, 1989)
- The Origenist Controversy: The Cultural Construction of an Early Christian Debate (Princeton: Princeton University Press, 1992)
- Women and Religion: The Original Sourcebook of Women in Christian Thought, edited by E. A. Clark and H. Richardson, with assistant editors G. Brower and R. Styers (San Francisco: Harper San Francisco, 1996)
- St. Augustine on Marriage and Sexuality, edited by E. A. Clark (Washington: Catholic University of America Press, 1996)
- Reading Renunciation: Asceticism and Scripture in Early Christianity (Princeton: Princeton University Press, 1999)
- History, Theory, Text: Historians and the Linguistic Turn (Cambridge, Mass.: Harvard University Press, 2004)
- Founding the Fathers: Early Church History and Protestant Professors in Nineteenth-Century America (Philadelphia: University of Pennsylvania Press, 2011)
- The Fathers Refounded. Protestant Liberalism, Roman Catholic Modernism, and the Teaching of Ancient Christianity in Early Twentieth-Century America (Pennsylvania: University of Pennsylvania Press, 2019)

=== Articles and book chapters ===
- "John Chrysostom and the 'Subintroductae'", Church History, vol. 46, no. 2 (1977) 171-85
- "Jesus as Hero in the Vergilian 'Cento' of Faltonia Betitia Proba", Vergilius, E. A. Clark and D. F. Hatch, no. 27 (1981) 31-9
- "Ascetic Renunciation and Feminine Advancement: A Paradox of Late Ancient Christianity", Anglican Theological Review 6 (1981) 240-57
- "Claims on the Bones of Saint Stephen: The Partisans of Melania and Eudocia", Church History, vol. 51, no. 2 (1982) 141-56
- "'Adam's Only Companion': Augustine and the Early Christian Debate on Marriage", Recherches Augustiniennes, 21 (1986) 139-62
- "The Place of Jerome's Commentary on Ephesians in the Origenist Controversy: The Apokatastasis and Ascetic Ideals", Vigiliae Christianae, vol. 41, no. 2 (1987) 154-71
- "Foucault, The Fathers, and Sex", Journal of the American Academy of Religion, vol. 56, no. 4 (1988) 619-41
- "Theory and Practice in Late Ancient Asceticism: Jerome, Chrysostom, and Augustine", Journal of Feminist Studies in Religion, vol. 5, no. 2 (1989) 25-46
- "New Perspectives on the Origenist Controversy: Human Embodiment and Ascetic Strategies", Church History, vol. 59, no. 2 (1990) 145-62
- "1990 Presidential Address: Sex, Shame, and Rhetoric: En-Gendering Early Christian Ethics", Journal of the American Academy of Religion, vol. 59, no. 2 (1991) 221-45
- "Elite Networks and Heresy Accusations: Towards a Social Description of the Origenist Controversy", Semeia 56 (1991) 81-117
- "Ideology, History, and the Construction of 'Woman' in Late Ancient Christianity", Journal of Early Christian Studies, 2 (1994) 155-84
- "Sane Insanity: Women and Asceticism in Late Ancient Christianity", Medieval Encounters, Vol. 3, Issue 3 (1997) 211–230
- "The Lady Vanishes: Dilemmas of a Feminist Historian after the 'Linguistic Turn'", Church History, vol. 67, no. 1 (1998) 1-31
- "Holy Women, Holy Words: Early Christian Women, Social History, and the 'Linguistic Turn'", Journal of Early Christian Studies 6 (1998) 413-30
- "Introduction", Church History, vol. 69, no. 2 (2000) 277-80
- "Women, Gender, and the Study of Christian History",Church History, vol. 70, no. 3 (2001) 395-426
- "Engaging Bruce Lincoln", Method & Theory in the Study of Religion, vol. 17, no. 1 (2005) 11-17
- "The Celibate Bridegroom and His Virginal Brides: Metaphor and the Marriage of Jesus in Early Christian Ascetic Exegesis", Church History, vol. 77, no. 1 (2008) 1-25
- "From Patristics to Early Christian Studies", Oxford Handbook of Early Christianity, edited by S. Ashbrook Harvey and D. Hunter (Oxford: Oxford University Press, 2008) 7-41
- "Postcolonial Theory and the Study of Christian History Introduction", Church History, vol. 78, no. 4 (2009) 847-8
- "The Retrospective Self", The Catholic Historical Review 101.1 (2015) vi-27
