= Maureen Tilley =

Maureen Tilley (1948–2016) was professor of early Christian history in the theology department of Fordham University. She was an expert on Augustine of Hippo, martyrdom, women in late antiquity, scripture, and Donatism. She was known as one of the world's most accomplished scholars of Christianity in North Africa.

== Education ==
Tilley received an undergraduate degree from the University of San Francisco. She completed her doctoral studies under Elizabeth A. Clark at Duke University in 1989. Her PhD thesis was The Use of Scripture in Christian North Africa: An Examination of Donatist Hermeneutics.

== Research and career ==
Tilley took her position at Fordham University in 2006. She had previously held positions at Florida State University (1989–1998) and the University of Dayton (1998–2006). In 2011, she was as the Thomas F. Martin St. Augustine fellow at Villanova University. In the same year she was promoted to full professor.

Tilley published more than 70 articles and an influential monograph, The Bible in Christian North Africa (1997). She also published two books of translations (Donatist Martyr Stories and The Donatist Controversy) and co-edited a volume of essays with Susan A. Ross.

Tilley was president of the North American Patristics Society (2005–6), the fifth woman to lead the society, following Clark, Patricia Cox Miller, Susan Ashbrook Harvey, J. Rebecca Lyman. According to Tilley's colleague Elizabeth Johnson, Tilley was part of the first generation of women scholars who brought a contemporary perspective to issues of systematic theology.

== Death and reception ==
Tilley died at the age of 66 on 3 April 2016 of pancreatic cancer.

In honour of Tilley, the volume Colours and Textures of Roman North Africa: Essays in Memory of Maureen A. Tilley was published by the Catholic University of America Press in 2023, edited by Elizabeth A. Clark and Zachary B. Smith.

== Bibliography ==
- 'The Ascetic Body and the (Un)Making of the World of the Martyr', Journal of the American Academy of Religion, Volume LIX, Issue 3, Fall 1991, 467–480
- Donatist Martyr Stories (Translated Texts for Historians) (1996)
- The Bible in Christian North Africa. The Donatist World (Fortress Press, 1997)
- (co-edited with Susan A. Ross) Broken and Whole. Essays on Religion and the Body (1995)
- The Donatist Controversy. The Works of Saint Augustine, a Translation for the 21st Century (Augustinian Heritage Institute, 2019)
