= Gamble House (Pasadena, California) =

Historic house in Pasadena, California

- David B. Gamble House
- U.S. National Register of Historic Places
- U.S. National Historic Landmark
- California Historical Landmark
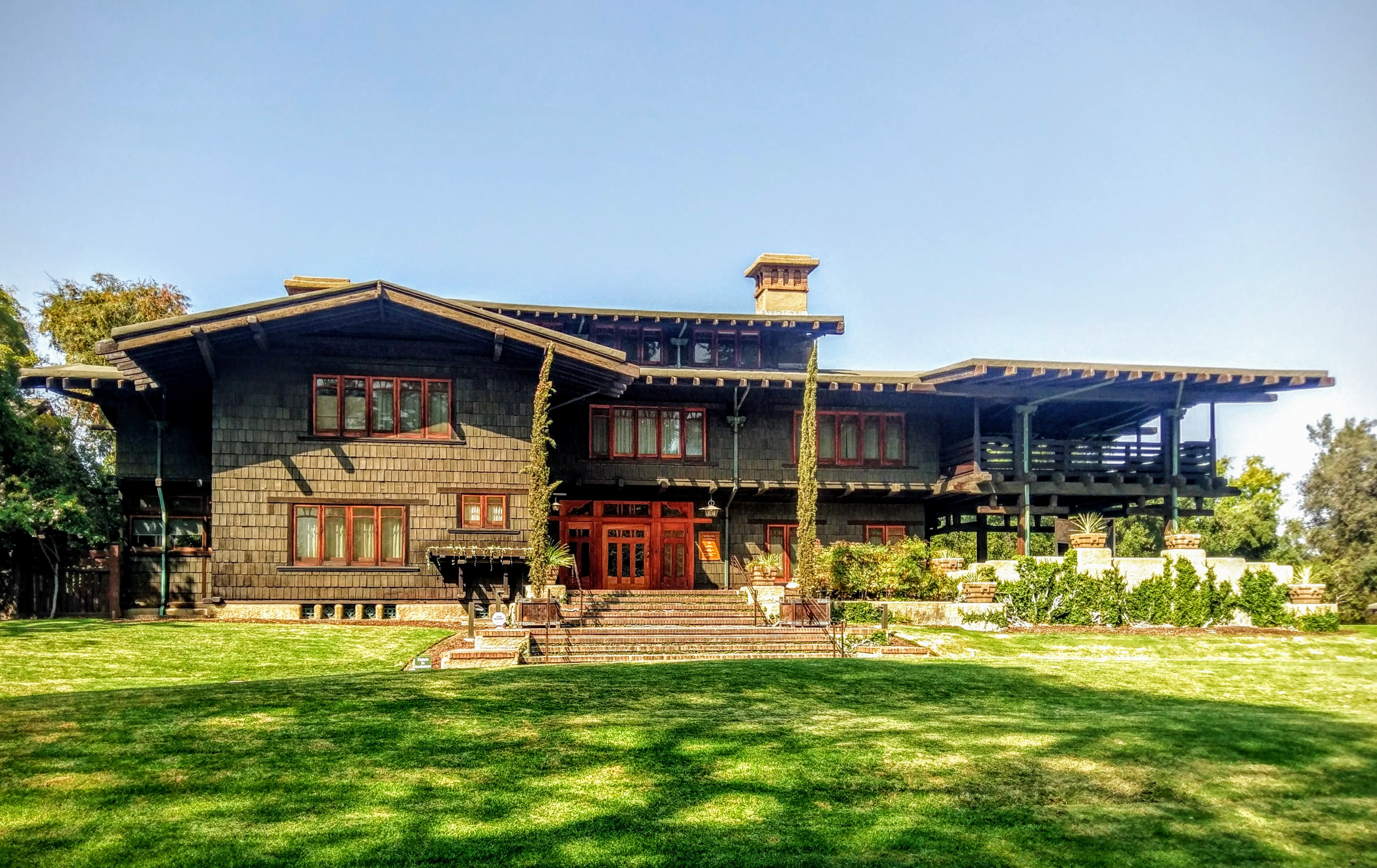
- The Gamble House in 2016

- Location within the Los Angeles metropolitan area Location within California Location within the United States
- Interactive map showing the location for Gamble House
- Location: 4 Westmoreland Place, Pasadena, California
- Coordinates: 34°9′5.62″N 118°9′38.88″W
- Built: 1909
- Architect: Greene & Greene
- Architectural style: Bungalow in American Craftsman style of Arts and Crafts Movement
- NRHP reference No.: 71000155
- CHISL No.: 871

Significant dates
- Added to NRHP: September 3, 1971
- Designated NHL: December 22, 1977

The Gamble House, also known as the David B. Gamble House, is a historic American Craftsman home in Pasadena California designed by the architectural firm of Greene and Greene. Constructed in 1908–1909 as a winter home for David B. Gamble, son of Procter & Gamble founder James Gamble, it is a National Historic Landmark and a California Historical Landmark. It is open to the public regularly for tours and events.

== History ==
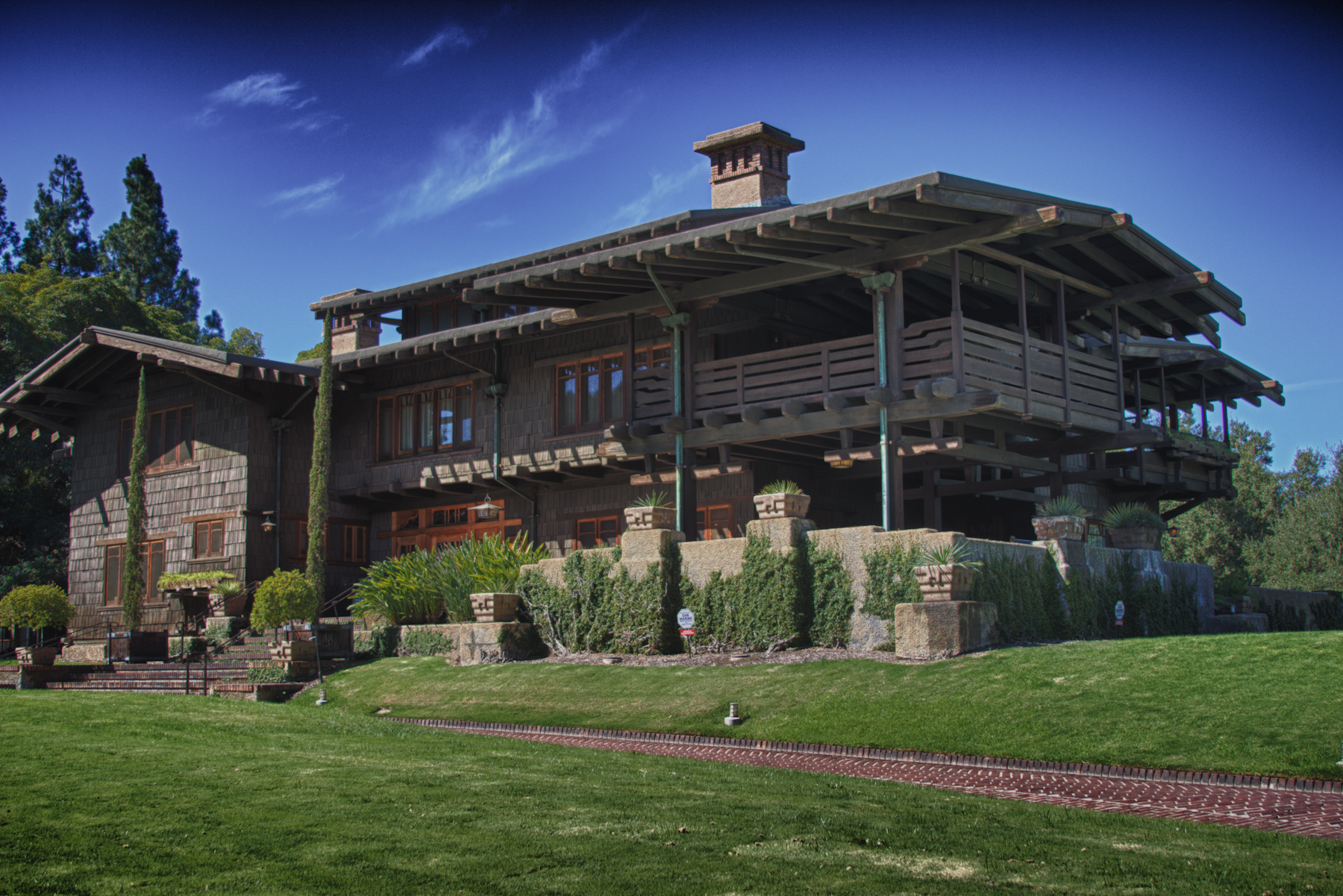
Exterior view from the front lawn, showing southwest-facing front door and front gable

Like a number of other wealthy Midwestern families, David and Mary Gamble chose to spend their winters in Pasadena, escaping the harsher climate of Cincinnati, where the Procter & Gamble Company was (and is) based. They were drawn to nearby examples of the architecture of the Greene and Greene firm, and hired the two brothers to design their home in May 1907. Considering that many Greene and Greene homes have been altered to some degree and stripped of original furnishings designed for them by the architects, the Gamble House is rare in being intact and unaltered, as well as containing all of its original Greene and Greene furniture.

David and Mary Gamble lived in the house during the winter months until their deaths in 1923 and 1929, respectively. Mary's younger sister Julia lived in the house until her death in 1943. Cecil Huggins Gamble and his wife Louise Gibbs Gamble lived in the house beginning in 1946. They briefly considered selling it, until prospective buyers spoke of painting the interior woodwork white. In 1966, the Gamble family turned the house over to the city of Pasadena in a joint agreement with the University of Southern California (USC) School of Architecture. The Gamble House was declared a National Historic Landmark in 1977. Today, two competitively selected students live in the house, changing annually.

Examples of the Greenes' architecture, including the Gamble House, fell out of fashion and were largely ignored by architectural critics during the 1930s and 40s. After the Second World War, however, their work received newfound popularity, mainly due to the efforts of Elizabeth Gordon, editor of House Beautiful magazine. Gamble House was included in a list of all-time top 10 houses in Los Angeles in a Los Angeles Times survey of experts in December 2008.

The exterior of the house gained worldwide exposure as the Brown Mansion, the home (in 1955) of Emmett "Doc" Brown in the 1985 movie Back to the Future and more prominently in the 1990 movie Back to the Future Part III.

Additionally, the house was featured on This Old House with then host Bob Vila in 1987.

In November 2019, ownership switched from the School of Architecture at University of Southern California to the Gamble House Conservancy run by the city of Pasadena.

== Design ==
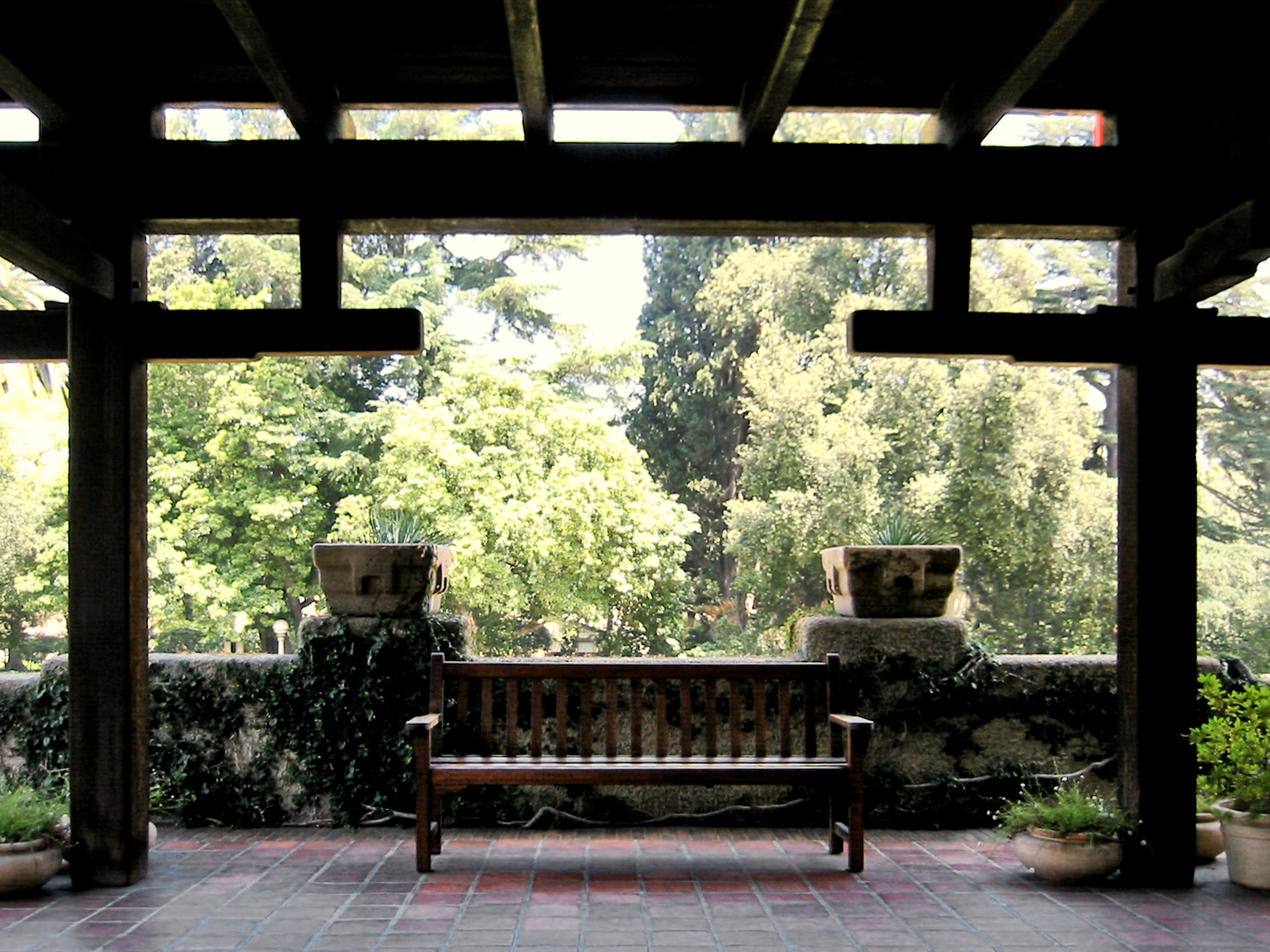
View from the front porch

The design of the Gamble House shows the influence of traditional Japanese aesthetics and a certain California spaciousness born of available land and a permissive climate. The Arts and Crafts Movement in American Craftsman style architecture was focused on the use of natural materials, attention to detail, aesthetics, and craftsmanship.

The house is located on a grassy knoll overlooking Pasadena's Arroyo Seco, a broad, seasonally dry river bed. The Greenes designed the house to complement its natural setting. The architectural details reflect a love of nature, as flowers and trees were brought to the interior—creating pictures in wood, metal, art glass, and semi-precious stone. The building itself appears enmeshed with the landscape, achieved by a blend of man-made materials such as brick and rough dash-coat stucco and natural materials such as granite river stones and the creeping fig [ficus pumila] that grows on the foundations of the terrace and steps.

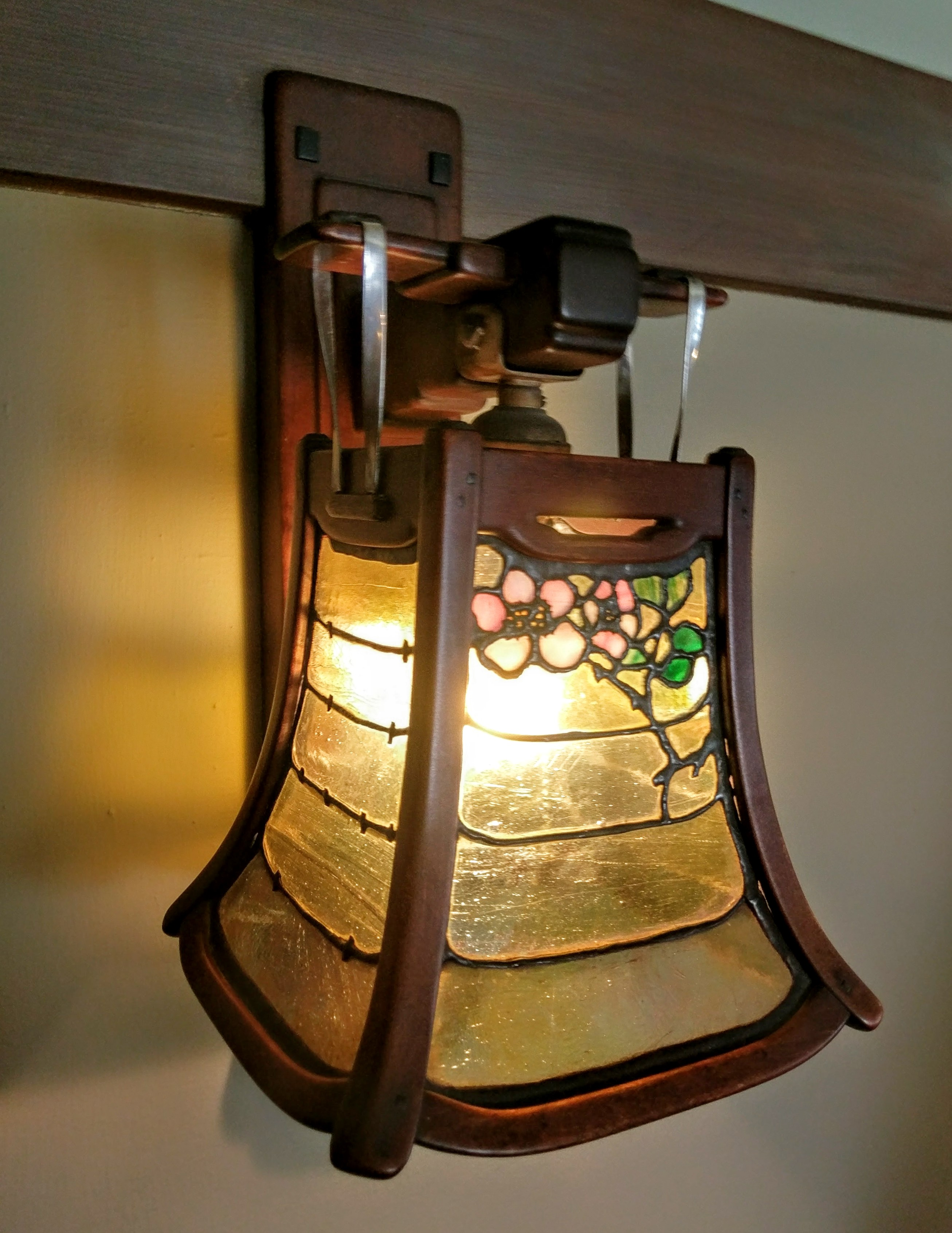
Lighting fixture at the Gamble House

The house displays a strong influence of Japanese architecture. Abstractions of clouds and mist, as well as other motifs applied to doors, windows, screens, beams, furniture, lanterns and more, show the influence of Japan.

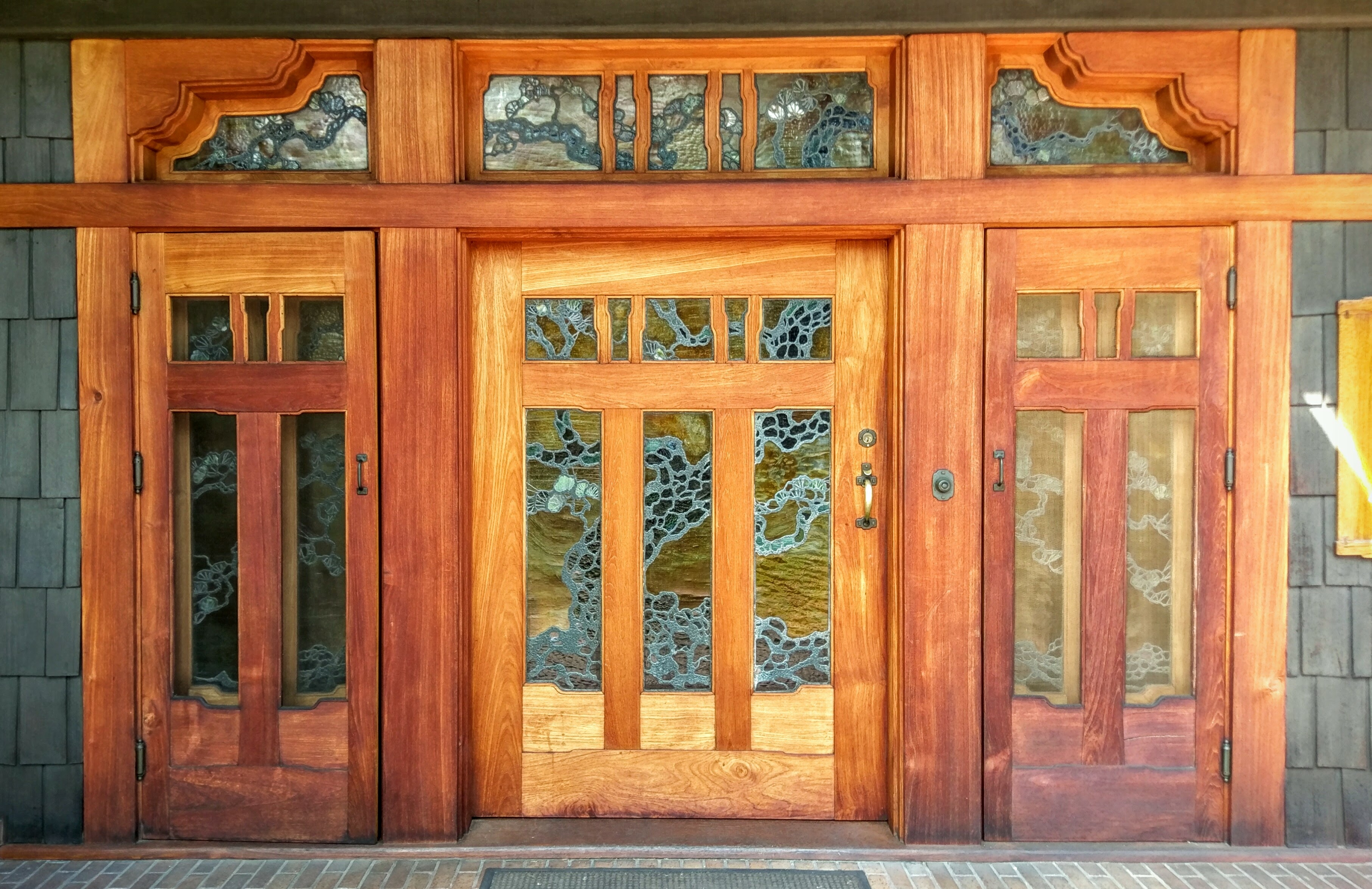
The three entry doors of the Gamble House

A "theme of three" runs through the house, with three architectural or decorative elements often grouped together, sometimes symmetrically arranged, but often not. The use of asymmetry alongside classical balance reflects nature's welcoming of variety in proportions.

=== Interiors ===
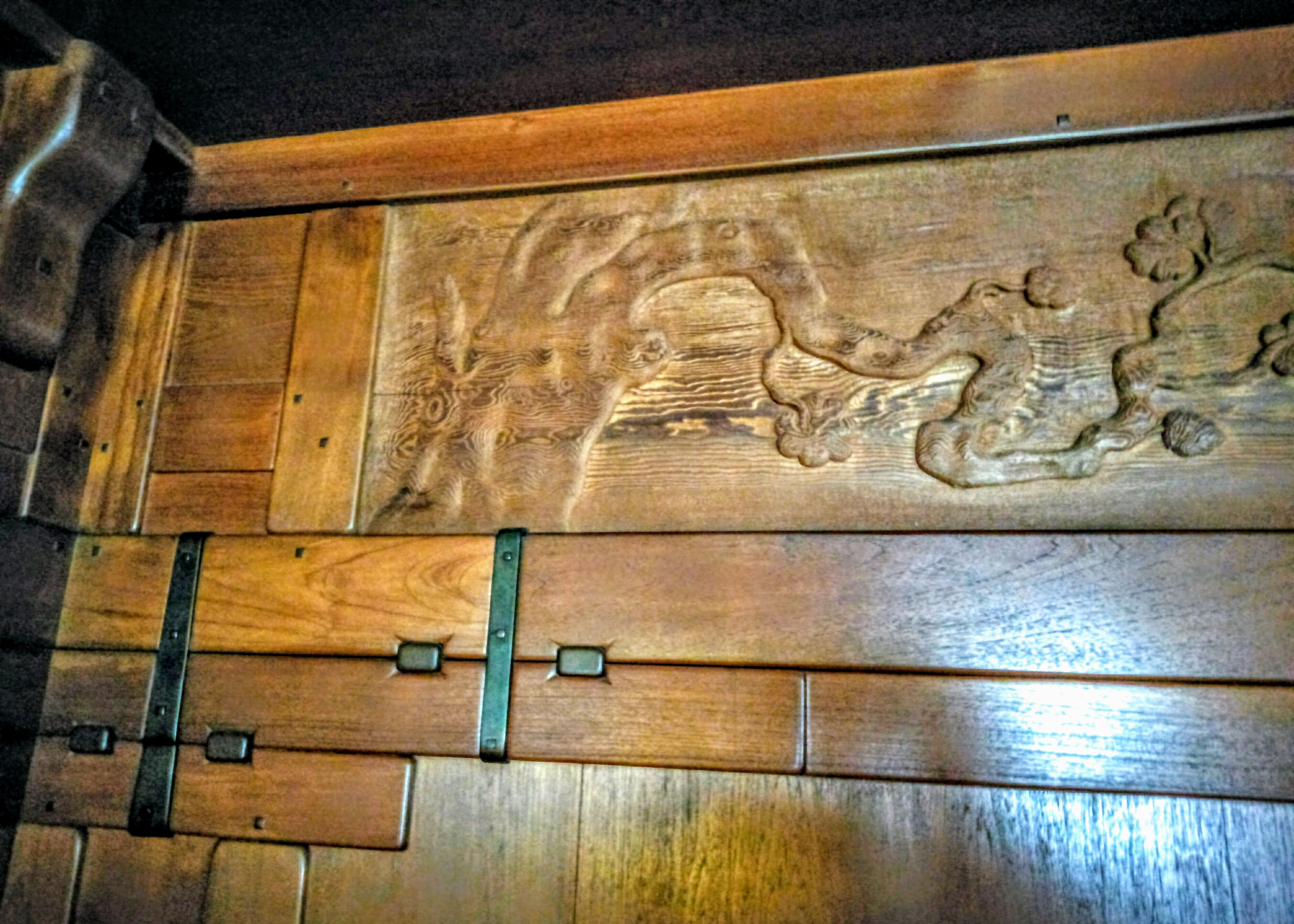
Carved wood design elements in the Gamble House

The interior spaces were finished using multiple species of wood. Teak, maple, oak, Port Orford cedar, and mahogany surfaces emphasize color, tone, grain and utility. An overriding impression of softness derives from the treatment of the wood surfaces, all of which have been rounded to eliminate sharp edges. Custom furniture, some with delicate inlay of contrasting wood, stones or metal, was designed by the architects for specific areas of the house. Fireplace surrounds and hearths feature decorative tile; even the fireplace tools were designed by the architects.

One of the teak panels in the entry hall is a concealed, spring-latch door leading to the kitchen; another panel opens to a coat closet.

The Greenes worked with an experienced team of local contractors and furniture makers, led by Peter and John Hall, who had worked with them in Pasadena on several previous homes. They, together with the Greenes, insisted on a high quality of woodworking throughout the house and for its furniture.

The woods, the low and horizontal room shapes, and the natural light that filters through the art glass exterior windows coexist with a relatively traditional plan, in which most rooms are regularly shaped and organized around a central hall. Although the house is not as spatially adventurous as the contemporary works of Frank Lloyd Wright, or even of the earlier New England "Shingle style," its casual plan reflects its original role as a seasonal home and its symmetries tend to be localized.

Ceiling heights are different on the first (8'10") and second floors (8'8") and in the den (9'10") and the forms and scales of the spaces are constantly shifting, especially as one moves from the interior of the house to its second-floor semi-enclosed porches and its free-form terraces, front and rear. The third floor was planned as a billiard room but was used as a storage attic by the Gamble family.

=== Rooms ===
The living room was designed without doors so that the room would be as open and inviting as possible. It also consisted of a spacious sitting room, decorated with five rugs manufactured in Bohemia after a watercolor design by Charles Greene. Across from the fireplace, there is a window that leads to the terrace, which overlooks the garden. The expansive window was designed to let light brighten the room during the late afternoon. At the far end of the room lie bookcases, a small games table, and a piano to offer entertainment and leisure. The piano was designed by the Greenes to blend into the paneling of the room.

On the west wing of the house, the dining room is surrounded by the terrace and the garden on three sides. According to Gamble House: Greene and Greene, by Edward R. Bosley, the room was designed to offer "nature to the indoors." The entrance of the room is diagonal from the hall with two doors. The doors are decorated with cloud-designed glass panels. The transition from hall to room was designed to provide a sense of "anticipation and discovery".

=== Exterior and gardens ===
Outdoor space was as important as the interior spaces. Exterior porches are found off three of the second-floor bedrooms and were used for sleeping or entertaining.

The main terrace is beyond the rear facade of the residence. It has patterned brick paving with planting areas, a large curvilinear pond, and garden walls made with distinctive clinker bricks and boulders. Paths made with large water-worn stones from the nearby Arroyo Seco are reminiscent of running brooks crossing the lawns. The overall landscape design and constructed garden elements are integrated with the architectural proportion and detailing. The triple front door and transom feature a Japanese black pine motif in plated (more than one layer) leaded art glass, highlighting the Asian influence that runs throughout the house.

== California Historical Landmark Marker ==
California Historical Landmark Marker NO. 871 at the site reads:

NO. 871 THE GAMBLE HOUSE - Built in 1908, the David B. Gamble House is a tribute to the genius of architects Charles Sumner Greene and Henry Mather Greene. Its design represents a unique California lifestyle and is a masterpiece of American craftsmanship. In 1966 it was made a gift by the Gamble family to the City of Pasadena in a joint agreement with the University of Southern California.

== Images ==
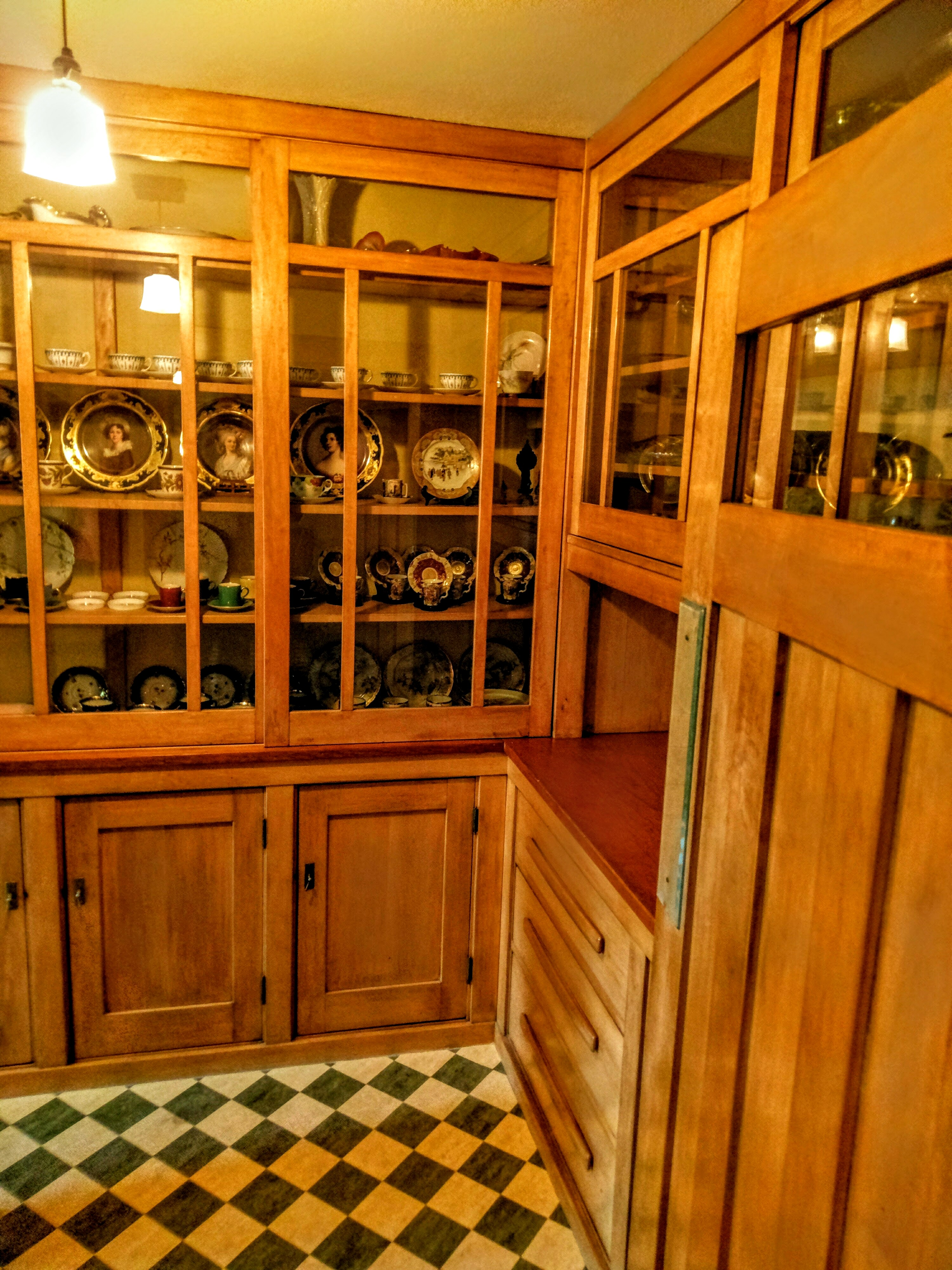
China cabinets

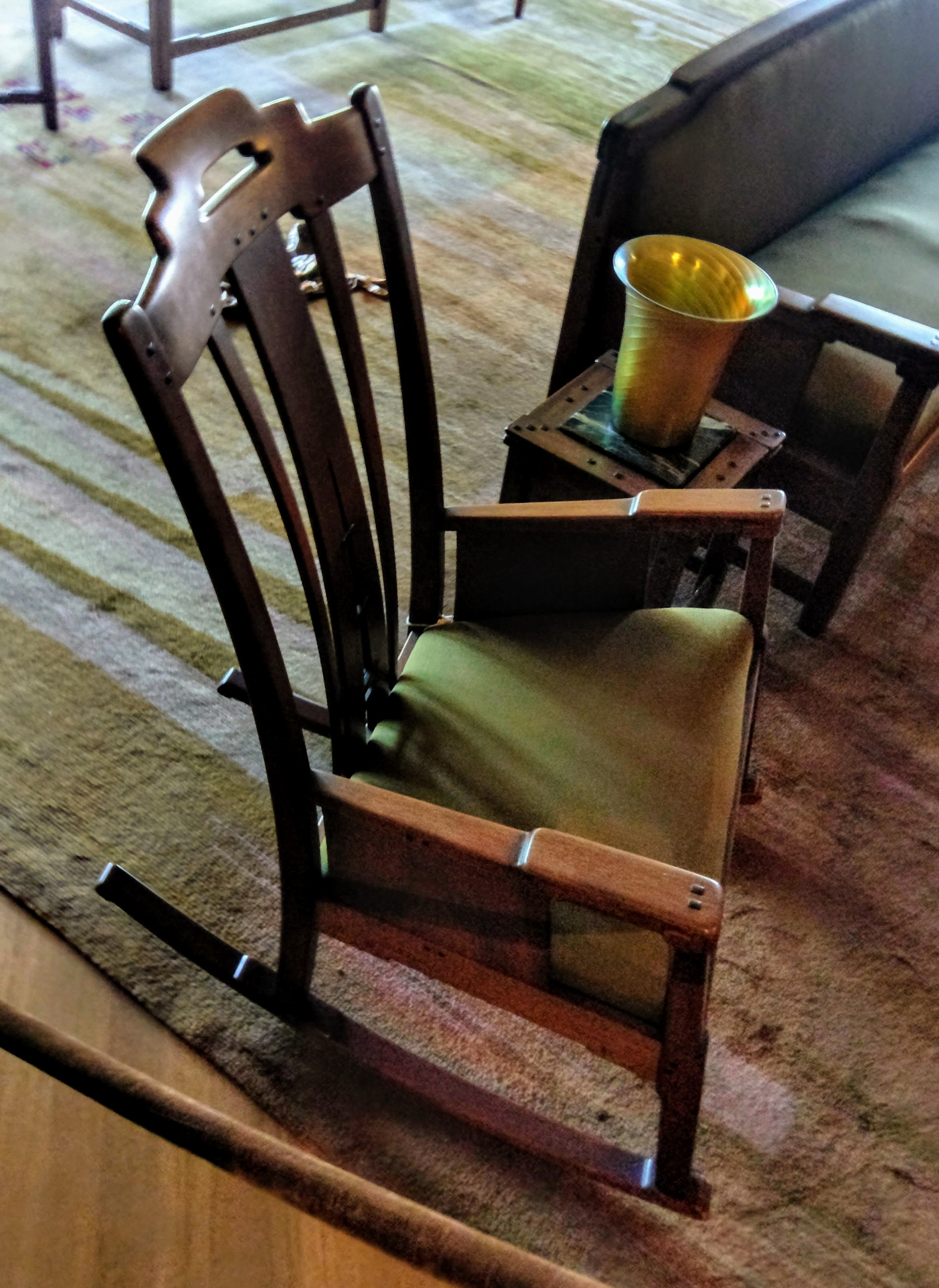
A rocking chair

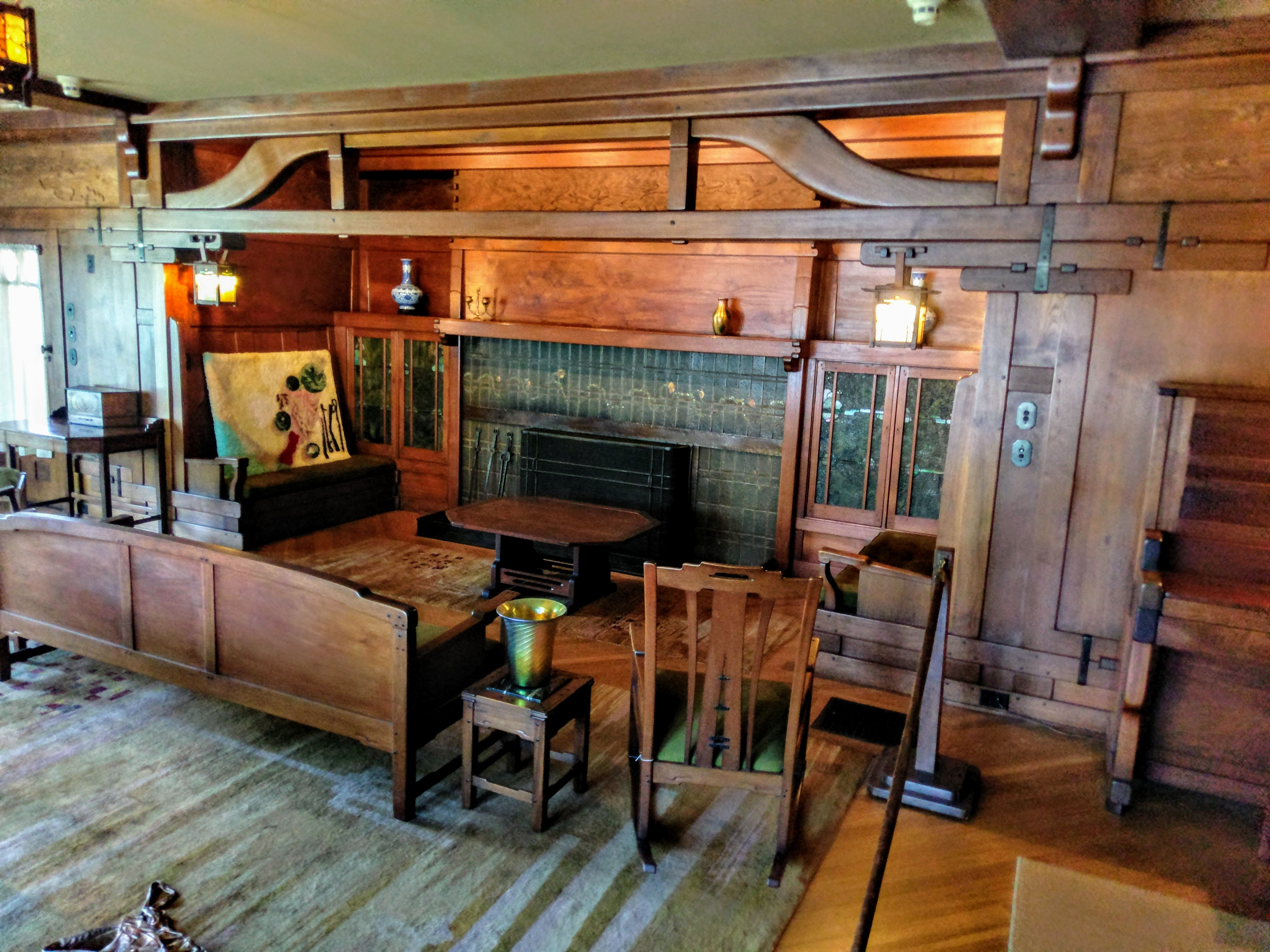
Sitting room

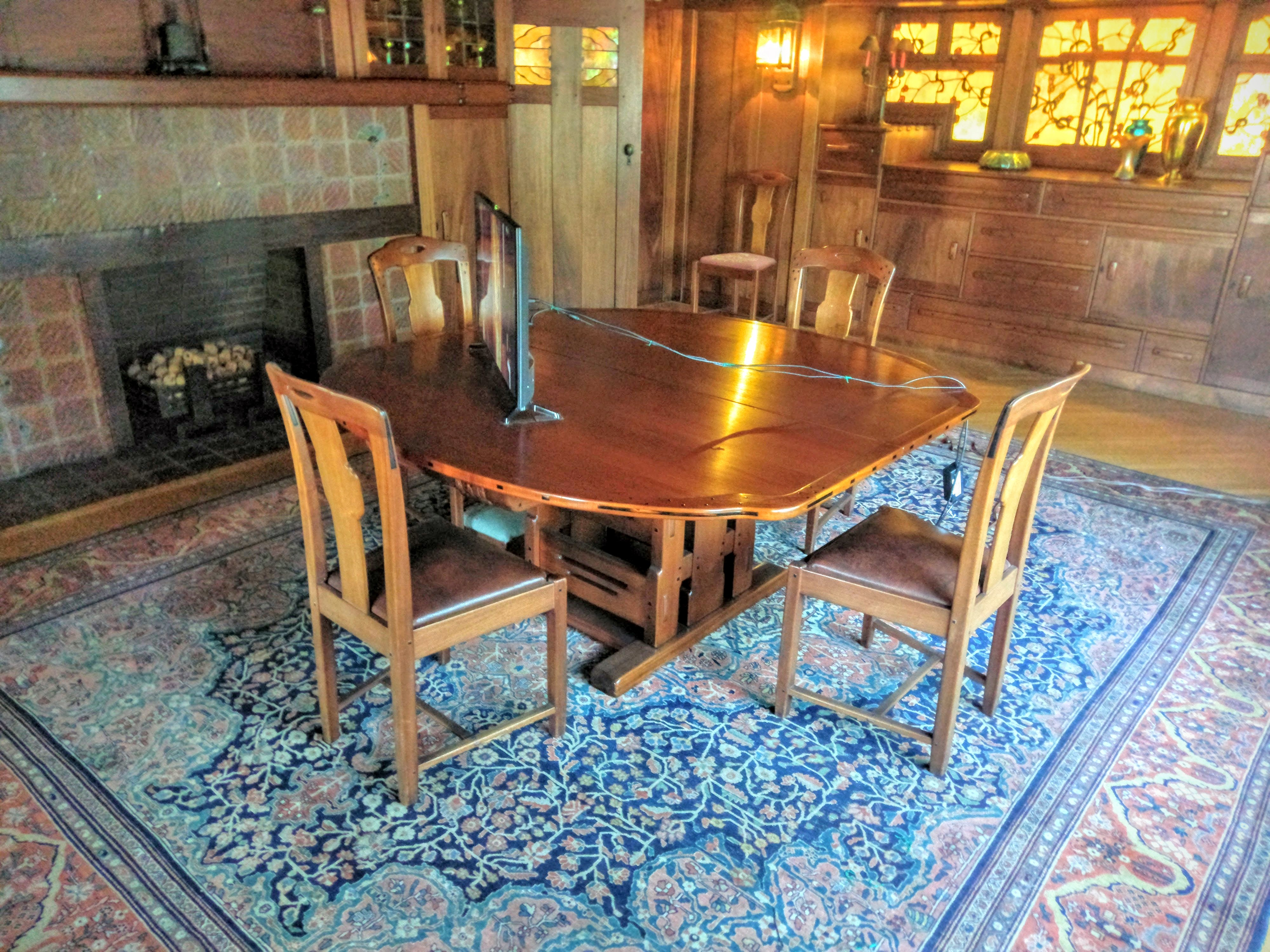
Dining table and chairs

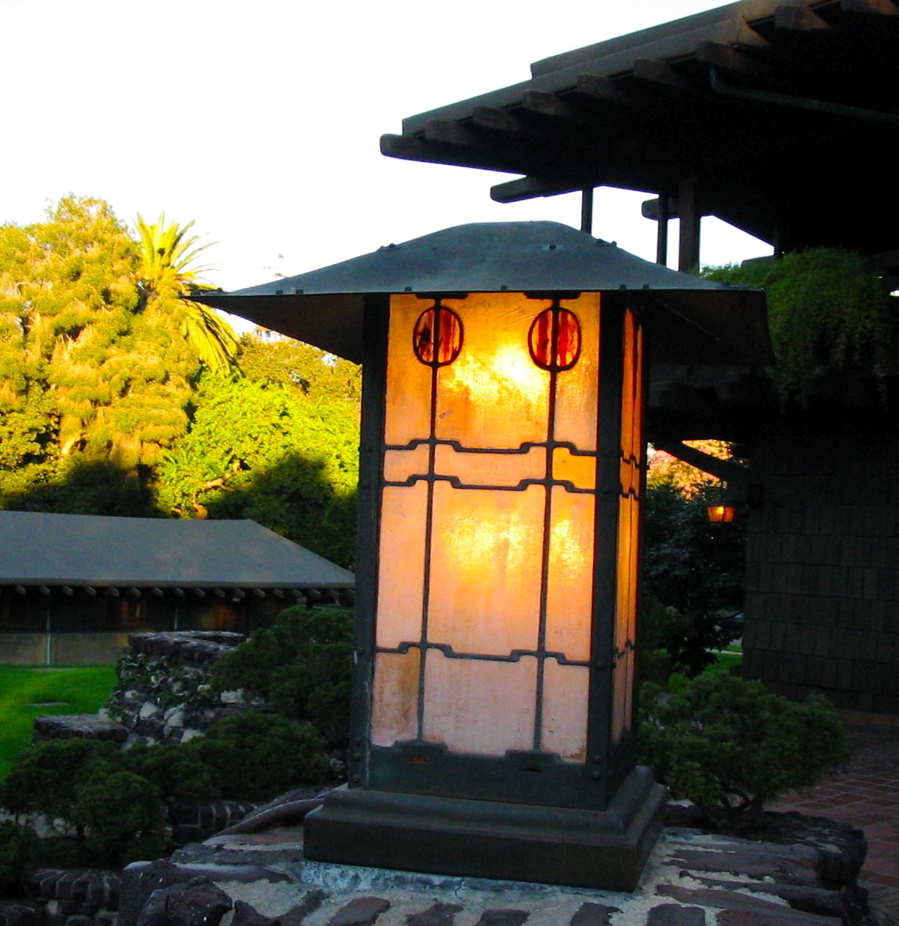
Outdoor lamp on the back porch

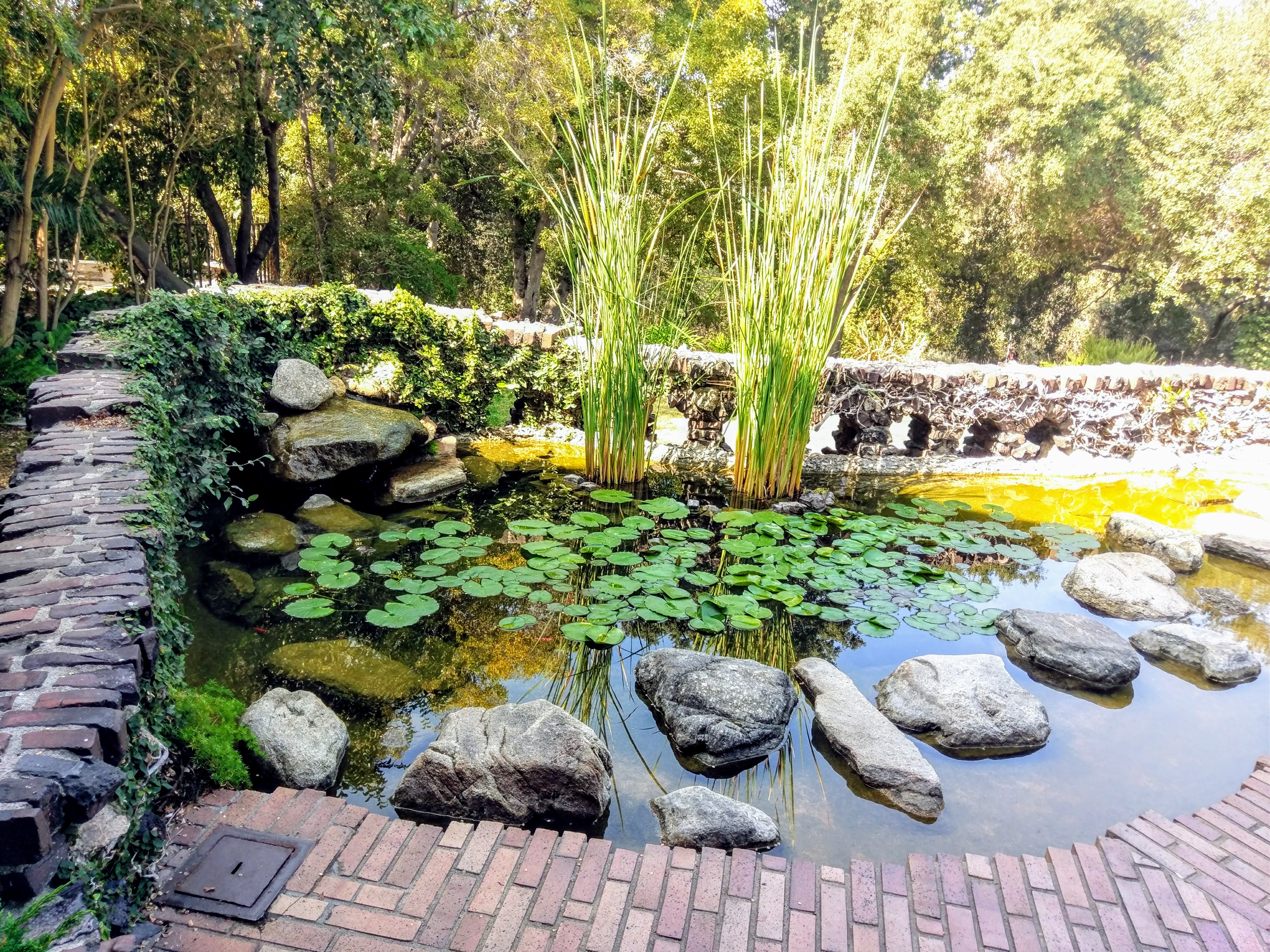
The garden pond

== David B. and Mary H. Gamble Professorship ==
The Gamble family established a professorship at nearby Occidental College. The professorship has been held by Buddhist Studies expert, Dr. Dale Wright, and is currently held by Historian of Late Antiquity Dr. Kristi Upson-Saia.

== See also ==
- Anglo-Japanese style
- Japonisme
- List of National Historic Landmarks in California
- National Register of Historic Places listings in Pasadena, California
