= Bahar Davary =

Iranian-American theologian

- Citizenship: Iranian-American
- Education: The Catholic University of America (PhD); University of Tehran (BA, MA)
- Awards: Hobart & William Smith Excellence in Community Service Award (2003); Adèle Mellen Prize (2009); Steber Professor (2011); Mortar Board Award (2015)
- Scientific career
- Fields: theology, religious studies
- Institutions: University of San Diego
- Thesis: The Image of Woman in Islamic Tradition: a Study of its Formation in. Language and Tradition (2001)
- Doctoral advisor: William Cenkner

Bahar Davary is an Iranian-American religious studies scholar and Professor of Theology and Religious Studies at the University of San Diego. She is known for her work on comparative study of religion and Islamic studies.

== Career ==
Davary's interests are broadly within the field of Comparative Religion focusing on Islamic studies. Davary's first monograph Women and the Qur'an: A Study in Islamic Hermeneutics (Lewiston, New York: Edwin Mellen Press, 2009), which was awarded the Adèle Mellen Prize, examines development, continuity, and change in the representation of women in the Qur'an with a focus on dynamic identities of the text. Davary's later writings focuses on the development of Muslim feminist ideas, especially as it involves with the questions of Orientalism, colonialism, neo-orientalism, and patriarchy. She has published several papers in academic journals and encyclopedias and has presented more than 100 lectures locally, nationally, and internationally. Since 2005, She has been a faculty member of USD. Prior to that she was a professor at Hobart and William Smith Colleges in upstate New York.
