= Edwin Mellen Press =

International independent academic publishing house

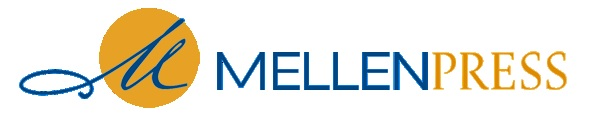
- Status: Active
- Founded: 1972; 54 years ago
- Founder: Herbert W. Richardson
- Country of origin: United States
- Headquarters location: Lewiston, New York; Queenston, Canada; Lampeter, Wales
- Distribution: Self-distributed; worldwide
- Publication types: Peer-reviewed academic and reference books
- Nonfiction topics: Humanities, education, social science, arts, law
- Imprints: Mellen Biblical Press; Mellen Poetry Press
- Official website: www.mellenpress.com

The Edwin Mellen Press, sometimes stylised as Mellen Press, is an academic publisher founded in 1972 by theology professor Herbert W. Richardson. It has been involved in a number of notable legal and academic controversies, sometimes being labeled as a vanity press.

== History ==
Following its founding in 1972, the publishing house was initially meant to publish specialized scholarship produced in Richardson's department at the University of St Michael's College, (Note: A constituent college of the University of Toronto.) Early publications included bibliographies, translations, and dissertations completed by faculty and doctoral students at the University of Toronto. The house was named after Richardson's grandfather, Edwin Mellen, whom he describes as a lover of books, as was Edwin Mellen University, a private university located on Grand Turk, Turks and Caicos Islands operated by Richardson since 1992.

Under Richardson, the publishing house grew and began publishing works by scholars outside of the University of Toronto, widening its range of topics to the broader humanities and social sciences. By 1979 it had moved to new locations in Lewiston, New York and Queenston, Canada. Its office in Lampeter, Wales opened in 1987. By 1990 it was publishing up to 150 titles a year. Following Richardson's professional parting with St. Michael's College following a gross misconduct investigation (Note: Trueheart considers the gross misconduct investigation to have been in part caused by Richardson's activities operating his publishing firm and private university and, according to Jake New, of the Chronicle of Higher Education, laid twelve charges against Richardson of not properly disclosing the amount of time he had spent operating his business ventures, compared to his activities for St. Michael's College. New additionally points out that scholars such as Westhues consider Richardson's investigation, tribunal and firing a case of academic mobbing.) and subsequent dismissal in October 1994, he expanded his publishing business, raising the annual number of works published to 350.

== Scholarly publishing ==
Mellen Press describes its goals in selecting works as valuing "scholar-for-scholar research more than anything", stating: "The manuscript must make a contribution to scholarship," and states that its publications are peer-reviewed, with research libraries constituting its primary customer base.

Its Adèle Mellen Prize is awarded to an author for a book which, in the judgment of its peer reviewers, makes a "distinguished contribution to scholarship". (Note: A number of scholars have received this prize since 1985, including Joyce E. Salisbury (1985), Elizabeth A. Clark (1986), Karl W. Schweizer (1989), Masudul Alam Choudhury (2002), Mario I. Aguilar (2004), Hilmi M. Zawati (2004), Michael Egan (2006), Joëlle Rollo-Koster (2008), Nikolai Tolstoy (2009), Paula Birnbaum and Anna Novakov (2009), Bahar Davary (2009), and Sue Brannan Walker (2013).)

== Reception ==
Although some critics have described Edwin Mellen Press as a vanity press, the publisher maintains that it is a "non-subsidy academic publisher" and does not accept payments from authors for publication. It has often taken legal action against critics alleging it to be a vanity press — which, some critics claim, has further damaged its reputation.

The publisher's litigiousness began in 1993, when its former employee Robert West urged the American academic magazine Lingua Franca to publish an exposé, describing the publisher's founder, Richardson, as a "rogue professor" operating a "vanity press". Lingua Franca published "Vanity's Fare: The Peripatetic Professor and His Peculiarly Profitable Press" by Warren St. John as the cover story of its September–October 1993 issue. The article described the publisher as a "quasi-vanity press cunningly disguised as an academic publishing house" and, in particular, ridiculed the work Rulers of Reality and the Ruled Races (1990) by Joseph R. Washington Jr. In response, the publisher, in 1994, sued West and Lingua Franca for libel. West sent a letter of regret to Richardson for "the difficulties he had with Lingua Franca magazine and the University of Toronto", stating: "I do not believe Herbert Richardson to be a 'rogue professor,' nor do I believe that the Edwin Mellen Press was organized to be a vanity operation." However, in 1996, the publisher lost its lawsuit against Lingua Franca, on grounds that the article in dispute was "supported by an honest assessment of the facts at hand when the article was published".

In a 1995 conference talk, Brock University philosopher Murray Miles quoted Edwin Mellen Press material, noting the press says it "accepts no author subsidies but also pays no royalties" and expects authors to provide "error-free, camera-ready copy" by themselves — which, according to Miles, means that "a considerable expense is borne by the author." He described his own experience of having a manuscript accepted without having sent a requested short statement about the academic merits of the work, concluding that the press is "neither a traditional 'vanity press' nor a typical academic press either .... Here, then, is a puzzle worthy of the efforts of an investigative reporter."

In 1998, the press sued Oxford University Press concerning a review by R.W. Burgess in one of its publications, The Journal of Theological Studies, over the phrase "Edwin Mellen Press is generally perceived to be an academic vanity press". One year later, the journal retracted the offending statements, apologized, and published a new review.

In 2009, the press successfully sued the academic Thom Brooks for blog postings found by a court to be defamatory. One of these was titled "More reasons to avoid Edwin Mellen Press". Brooks was required to pay financial damages and offered his "sincere apologies", saying he accepts "without reservation that Mellen does not charge authors anything to have their works published" and "now accepts that there was no truth in any of those allegations and that the criticisms he made...were unjustified".

In 2012, the press pursued lawsuits against Hamilton's McMaster University and one of its librarians, Dale Askey, for $4.5 million in damages over statements alleged to be "false" and "defamatory in its tone and context". He had criticized Mellen Press on a blog post, which had been deleted prior to the publisher filing suit. The Canadian Association of University Teachers and others condemned the press for what they called SLAPP lawsuits intended to curtail academic freedom. Martha Reineke started a petition demanding that the press drop the suits. It garnered 2,691 signatures. According to coverage of this event in the Chronicle of Higher Education, more than 30 scholarly organizations condemned the press, which in turn maintained that its good reputation was at stake and that this concern had prompted the suit. In March 2013, the press dropped one suit against Askey but maintained another. In February 2015, the last of the lawsuits was settled out of court. Askey said, "The outcome of this case is essentially a neutral outcome for academic freedom. Both parties walk away from the matter admitting nothing and resolving nothing".

In 2013, the press threatened legal action against the Society for Scholarly Publishing for publishing blog posts containing what it characterized as "disparaging comments" and for allowing "libellous statements" to be posted in the reader comments section on Scholarly Kitchen. These posts were first removed and then restored in their entirety; but one reader comment which Mellen Press had found objectionable was removed.
