= Caroline T. Schroeder =

American women's and gender studies scholar

Caroline Theresa Schroeder
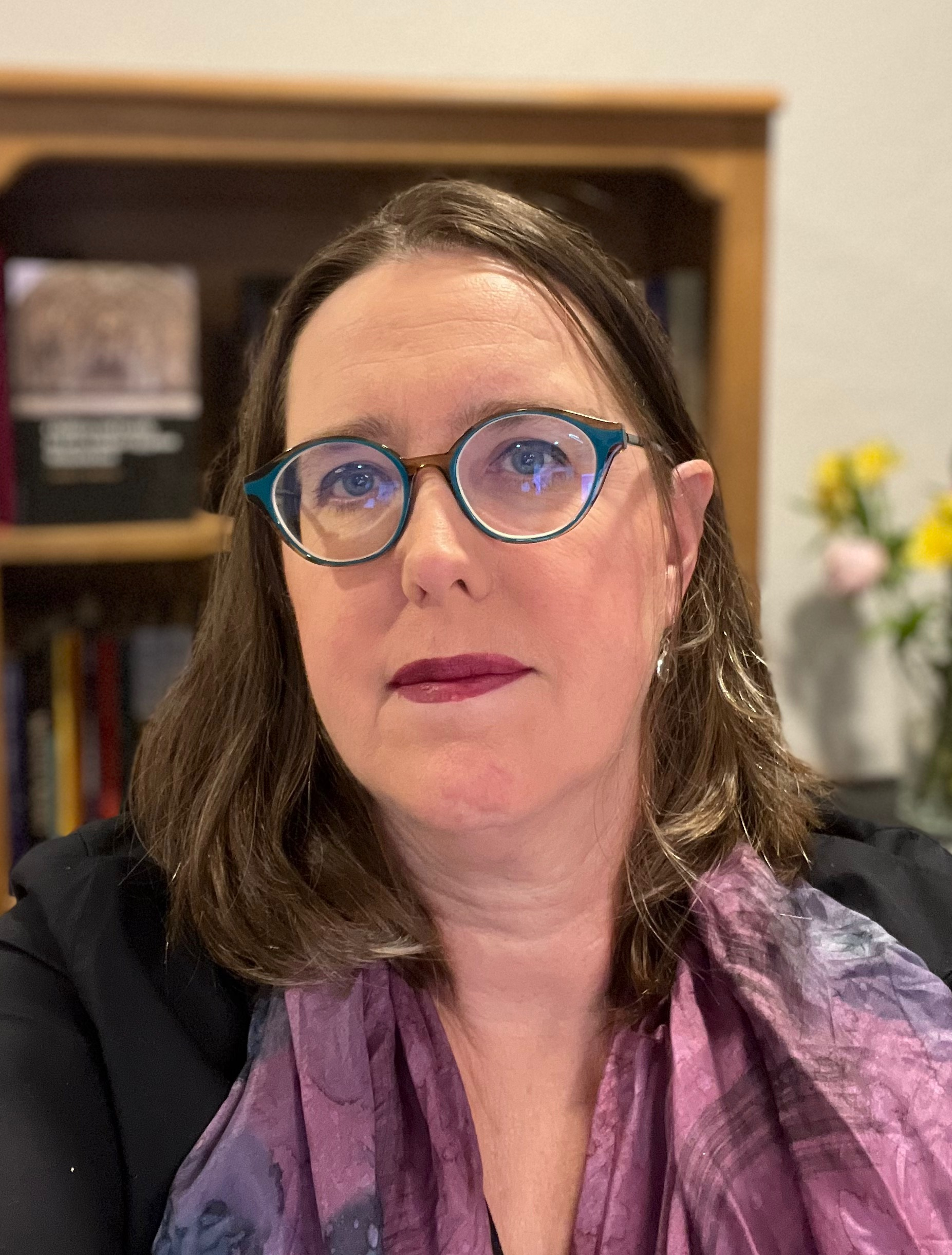
- Schroeder in 2022

Academic background
- Education: Brown University; Duke University
- Website: http://www.carrieschroeder.com/

Caroline Theresa Schroeder (born 1971) is professor of women's and gender studies at the University of Oklahoma. She is an expert on early Christianity.

== Early life ==
Schroeder is the daughter of Mary M. Schroeder.

== Education ==
Schroeder received her PhD from Duke University in 2002. Her thesis was entitled Disciplining the Monastic Body: Asceticism, Ideology, and Gender in the Egyptian Monastery of Shenoute of Atripe. She received her MA from Duke University in Religion in 1998, and her BA from Brown University in Religious Studies in 1993.

== Career ==
Before her appointment as professor at the University of Oklahoma, Schroeder was a professor at the University of the Pacific. She co-founded and co-directs the ground-breaking digital project Coptic Scriptorium. She has published extensively on women, gender, and monasticism. Her work has been described as 'immensely promising for scholars in the areas of late antiquity, gender studies and early Christian studies'. The volume she edited with Catherine M. Chin, Melania: Early Christianity through the Life of One Family. Christianity in late antiquity, came out of a symposium in honor of Elizabeth A. Clark held in 2013.

Schroeder has been awarded grants and fellowships from the National Endowment for the Humanities (NEH), the American Council of Learned Societies, the Woodrow Wilson Fellowship Foundation, and the Alexander Humboldt Foundation. Since 2013, the NEH have awarded Schroeder (and co-Project Director Amir Zeldes) multiple grants to digitize Coptic texts and to create and expand a suite of language processing tools to better analyze documents written in Coptic.

== Bibliography ==
- Children and Family in Late Antique Egyptian Monasticism (Cambridge: Cambridge University Press, 2020)
- Catherine M. Chin and Caroline T. Schroeder, Melania: Early Christianity through the Life of One Family. Christianity in late antiquity (Oakland: University of California Press, 2017)
- Monastic Bodies: Discipline and Salvation in Shenoute of Atripe (Philadelphia: University of Pennsylvania Press, 2007)
