= Heidi Marx =

Canadian religion professor

Heidi Marx is a professor of religion at the University of Manitoba in Winnipeg, Canada. Since July 2016, Marx has served as an Associate Dean in the Faculty of Arts. She is currently the Associate Dean of Undergraduate Studies, but has also filled two other portfolios.

== Education ==
Marx attended the University of Calgary from 1989 to 1993 and received her Bachelor of Arts in philosophy. Marx then continued her education to Pennsylvania State University from 1994 to 1999 where she received her PhD in medieval philosophy. After receiving her PhD, Marx attended University of California, Santa Barbara, from 2002 to 2009, where she received her PhD in ancient history.

== Career ==
After obtaining her PhD in ancient history at UC Santa Barbara in June 2009, Marx became a professor at the University of Manitoba in July 2009 and is currently a professor at the university. Her research topics are "History of Early Christianity, History of Ancient Philosophy, Religions of the Ancient Mediterranean World, Greco-Roman Medicine, and The Body in Antiquity". During her teaching career at the University of Manitoba, Marx has taught courses such as Introduction to World Religions, Introduction to Christianity, Introduction to the New Testament, Theory of Nature, History of Early Christian Thought, Gender, Sexuality, and the Body in Early Christianity, Religions of the Hellenistic and Roman Mediterranean, Texts in Original Languages – Coptic, and Advanced Studies in Christian Origins.

From 2012 to 2014, Marx held a Social Sciences and Humanities Research Council Insight Development grant.

Since 2014, Marx is the co-rounder and co-director (with Prof. Kristi Upson-Saia of Occidental College) of the international working group on Religion, Medicine, Disability, and Health in late antiquity, ReMeDHe (pronounced "remedy")

== Bibliography ==
=== Books ===
- Spiritual Taxonomies and Ritual Authority: Platonists, Priests, and Gnostics in the Third Century C.E. ISBN 0812247892

=== Research articles, essays, and chapters ===
- "Living Plants, Dead Animals, and Other Matters: Embryos and Demons in Porphyry of Tyre" Preternature 7.1 (2018)
- "The Good Physician: Imperial Doctors and Medical Professionalization in Late Antiquity" Studia Patristica LXXXI (2015)
- co-authored with Kristi Upson-Saia, "The State of the Question: Religion, Medicine, Disability, and Health in Late Antiquity" Journal of Late Antiquity 8.2 (Fall 2015): 257–272
- "Medicine," in Late Ancient Knowing:Exploration in Intellectual History, edited by C.M. Chin and Moulie Vidas. University of California Press, 2015.
- "Pythagoras the Theurgist: Porphyry and Iamblichus on the Role of Ritual in the Philosophical Life" in Religious Competition in the Third Century CE: Jews, Christians, and the Greco-Roman World, edited by Jordan Rosenblum, Lily Vuong, and Nathaniel DesRosiers. Vandenhoeck & Ruprecht, 2014, pp. 32–38.
- "Third-Century Daemonologies and the Via Universalis: Origen, Porphyry, and Iamblichus, on Daimones and other Angels" Studia Patristica XLIV-XLIX (2010)
- "A Strange Consensus: Daemonological Discourse in Origen, Porhyry, and Iamblichus" in The Rhetoric of Power in Late Antiquity, edited by Robert Frakes, Elizabeth DePalma Digeser, and Justin Stephens, 2010.
- "The Philosopher as Spiritual Guide: The Transmission of a Third-Century Image," in Philosophy and Abrahamic Religions: Scriptural Hermeneutics and Epistemology, edited by Torrance Kirby, Rahim Acar and Bilal Bas. Cambridge Scholars, 2013.
- "High Priests of the Highest God: Third-Century Platonists as Ritual Experts," Journal of Early Christian Studies (2010).
