= Herbert Richardson (publisher) =

American professor, pastor and founder of Edwin Mellen Press

Herbert Warren Richardson III
- Born: April 14, 1932 (age 94)
- Education: Ohio Military Institute; Baldwin-Wallace College; University of Paris (Sorbonne); Harvard Divinity School
- Occupations: Publisher; Professor
- Known for: Founder of Edwin Mellen Press
- Spouse: Dorothy Richardson
- Children: 4
- Relatives: Isaac Adams (great grandfather)

Herbert Warren Richardson (born April 14, 1932) is an American professor of theology, an ordained Presbyterian minister, and the founder of the Edwin Mellen Press, which describes itself as "a non-subsidy academic publisher of books in the humanities and social sciences."

== Early life ==
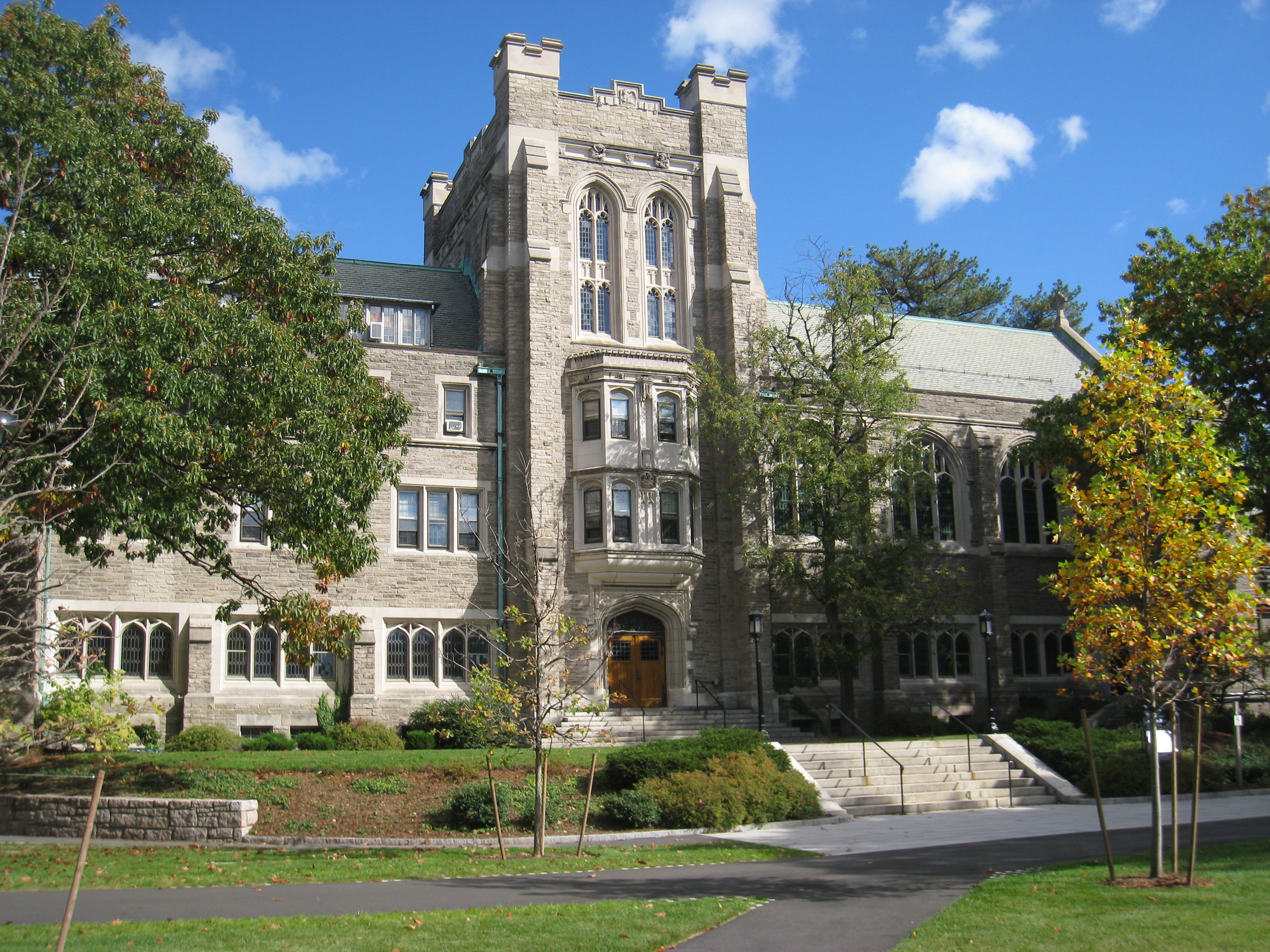
Harvard Divinity School

Herbert Warren Richardson was born in 1932. Richardson is the great-grandson of Isaac Adams, a Massachusetts State Senator and the inventor of the Adams Power Press. He attended Baldwin-Wallace College in Berea, Ohio and pledged an interracial fraternity, where his friends included James Lawson, the activist and an architect of the civil rights movement. In 1963, Richardson earned his doctorate at the Harvard Divinity School.

== Career ==
=== Academia ===
After receiving his doctorate, Richardson became an assistant professor at the Harvard Divinity School, where he was the first professor appointed to the HDS faculty who was trained by it. In the late 1960s, he left Harvard for the University of St. Michael's College. In 1981 he edited a book defending Sun Myung Moon and the Unification Church; this became an official text of that church.

In 1994, Richardson was fired by St. Michael's on the grounds that he had abused a medical leave and not fully disclosed the amount of time he was spending on a business venture, the Edwin Mellen Press.

=== Business ventures ===
In 1972, four years into his time at St. Michael's, Richardson started his own scholarly press. The business was called Edwin Mellen Press, after his grandfather. The press' original goal was to publish dissertations by graduate students from his department at St. Michael's, but expanded to publish books on a wide variety of topics. By 1979, the press had grown large enough to warrant larger premises in Lewiston, New York, and Queenston, Canada. The press was soon publishing as many as 150 titles a year and the opened a UK office in Lampeter, Wales, in 1987. Research libraries are the single main market for Mellen Press's books, with the University of London holding 4,926 of its books, and Harvard University holding 4,731 titles.

In 1991, the University of Toronto began an investigation of Richardson's conduct as a tenured professor, including this business venture.

Subsequently, as the University suspended accreditation of his courses in 1993 while the investigation continued, Richardson founded the Edwin Mellen University. Located in the Turks and Caicos, this business offered M.Phil. and D.Litt. degrees based on dissertations alone, and Baccaloreat degrees for life experience.

In 1994, the University of Toronto concluded that Richardson was a "dishonest and untrustworthy employee" who made "substantial financial gain" from running his two businesses, and sacked him. Richardson then continued to work through his two businesses, principally from his press facility in Lewiston NY.

=== Lawsuits ===
In 2013, Richardson made national news when he sued librarian and blogger Dale Askey for libel after Askey criticized the quality of Mellen's books in a blog post. According to coverage in the Chronicle of Higher Education, more than 30 scholarly organizations condemned the press, which maintained that its good reputation was at stake and had prompted the suit. The matter was settled, without payment, in February 2015. In the 1990s, Richardson brought a similar suit against the magazine Lingua Franca for its coverage critical of the company.

=== Nazi documents ===
In 1998, Richardson befriended Margot Lipton, a former secretary to Robert Kempner, a German-born American lawyer who served as assistant U.S. chief counsel during the International Military Tribunal at Nuremberg. In 1946, Kempner had received permission to keep documents from the trials, and brought thousands of them to his home. Lipton signed her legal decision-making power over to Richardson, and he moved her to an assisted-living facility in Lewiston, NY. In November 1998, Richardson persuaded Lipton to move Kempner's estate, over which she was given power by Kempner's will, to a white clapboard two-story house in Lewiston. On the house's front lawn, a wooden sign advertised "The Robert Kempner Collegium." In 1999, detectives looking for parts of the collection met with Richardson. He said "he was trying to help them... and make sure the Kempner collection was preserved." He then "agreed to relinquish" to the Holocaust Museum a set of Nazi documents that had come into his hands. The returned documents did not include pages from the diary of Alfred Rosenberg, a chief aide of Hitler, which been held by Robert Kempner until his death in 1993 at age 93. In 2013, Richardson was again contacted by investigators searching for the diary pages, which were found to be in his possession. The diary was recovered by U.S. ICE agents in June 2013 and is now in the possession of the Holocaust Museum.
