= Kristi Upson-Saia =

American historian

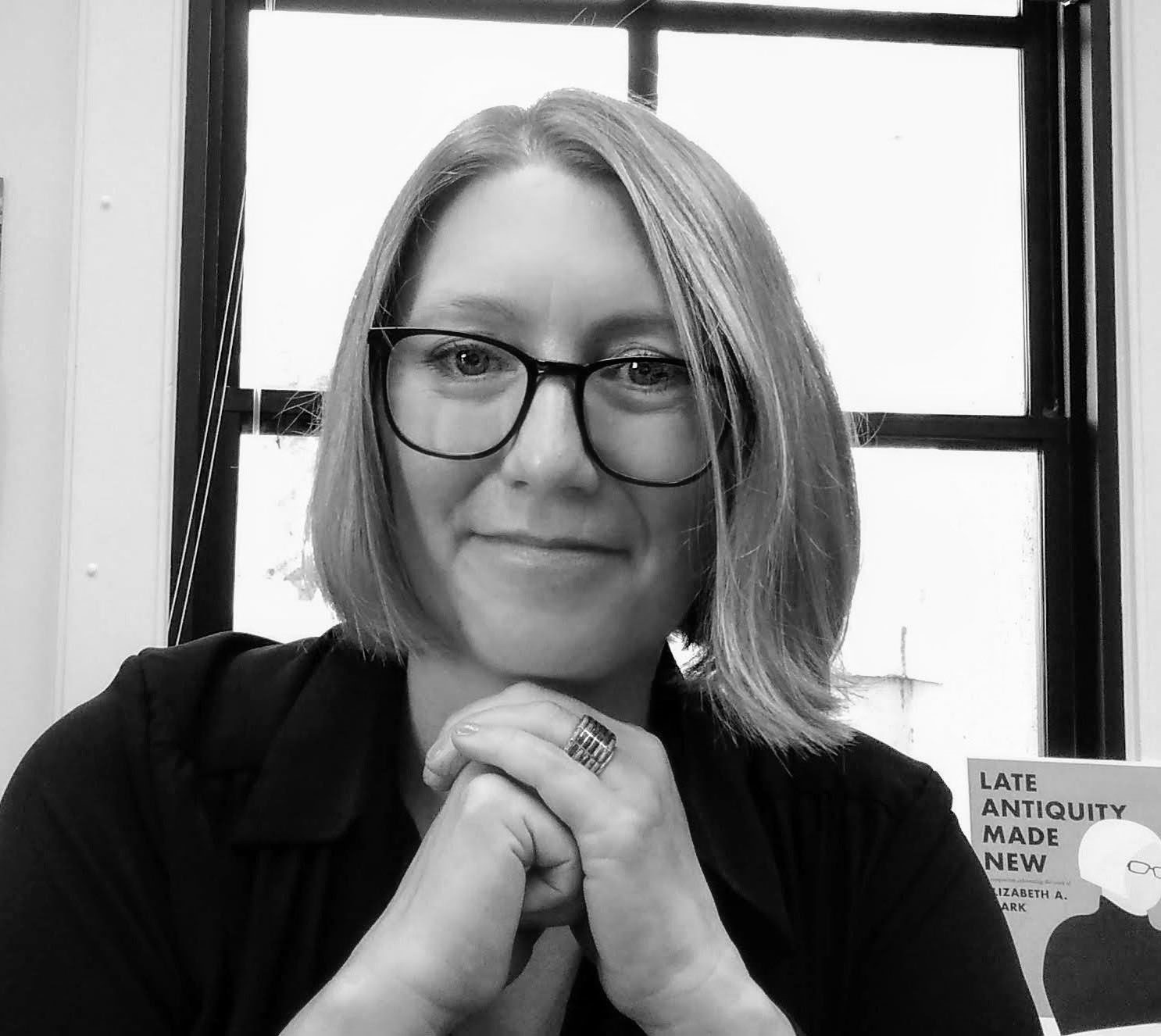
Kristi Upson-Saia (2021)

Kristi Upson-Saia is a Historian of Late Antiquity. She holds the David B. and Mary H. Gamble Professorship in Religion at Occidental College, Los Angeles, California. She specialises in the history of medicine, health and healing, and religions in the late ancient Mediterranean.

== Education ==
Upson-Saia was awarded her PhD from Duke University in 2006. Her doctoral thesis was entitled Making An Appearance: Sexual Renunciation and Gender Revision in the Attire of Early Christian Female Ascetics. Her doctoral project was supervised by Elizabeth A. Clark.

== Career and research ==
Upson-Saia published two books on dress studies, a monograph, Early Christian Dress: Gender, Virtue and Authority (Routledge, 2011) and an edited volume, Dressing Judeans and Christians in Antiquity (Routledge, 2014).

She has also published a book on the history of pre-modern medicine, Medicine, Health, and Healing in the Ancient Mediterranean (University of California Press, 2023).

With Heidi Marx at the University of Manitoba, Upson-Saia founded the international scholarly working group Religion, Medicine, Disability, and Health in late antiquity (ReMeDHe, pronounced "remedy"). She co-Directed the group from 2014-2026. In honor of her scholarship and her work with the organization, ReMeDHe sponsors an annual travel grant in her name.

== Accomplishments ==
In 2008, Upson-Saia's article "Caught in a Compromising Position: The Biblical Exegesis and Characterization of Biblical Protagonists in the Syriac Dialogue Hymns" was awarded the Best First Article Prize from the North American Patristics Society.

In 2011, Upson-Saia was awarded the Donald R. Loftsgordon Memorial Award for Outstanding Teaching, and in 2012, Upson-Saia won the Linda and Tod White Teaching Prize.

In 2021, Upson-Saia was awarded the David B. and Mary H. Gamble Professorship at Occidental College.

In 2022, Upson-Saia led efforts to procure a $1.5 million grant from the Mellon Foundation to fund Occidental College’s Humanities for Just Communities curriculum.

In 2025, Upson-Saia was awarded the Graham L. Sterling Memorial Award.

== Media ==
Upson-Saia was an expert contributor on Greg Jenner's BBC Radio 4 programme, 'You're Dead To Me', with comedian Stu Goldsmith. They discussed Greek and Roman Medicine.

Upson-Saia has also written about medical views on pregnancy for Nursing Clio, dress at the Met Gala for Hyperallergic, ancient sexual ethics with the Huffington Post.

== Bibliography ==
- Early Christian Dress: Gender, Virtue and Authority (London: Routledge, 2011)
- Dressing Judeans and Christians in Antiquity (London: Routledge, 2014).
- Medicine, Health, and Healing in the Ancient Mediterranean (500 BCE–600 CE) A Sourcebook, by Kristi Upson-Saia, Heidi Marx, and Jared Secord (Berkeley: University of California Press, 2023)
