= Mildred Campbell =

American historian (1897–1991)

- Born: May 31, 1897; Sheffield, Tennessee, U.S.
- Died: February 19, 1991 (aged 93); Poughkeepsie, New York, U.S.
- Occupation: Historian
- Awards: Guggenheim Fellowship (1951)

Academic background
- Education: Maryville College (BA); Columbia University (MA); Yale University (PhD)

Academic work
- Sub-discipline: History of England; American colonial history
- Institutions: Vassar College; Rockford College

Mildred Lucille Campbell (May 31, 1897 – February 19, 1991) was an American historian. After working at Rockford College and getting a PhD in Yale University, she spent three decades at Vassar College, eventually becoming a professor. She was author of The English Yeoman (1942) and a 1951 Guggenheim Fellow.

== Biography ==
Mildred Lucille Campbell was born on May 31, 1897, in Sheffield, Tennessee, to Rosanna Metzger and John Martin Campbell. After studying at a small schoolhouse around the Sheffield area and at Grand View Normal Institute, she studied at Maryville College, where she got a Bachelor of Arts degree in 1920. She chaired the history department at Chattanooga Central High School from 1920 to 1922. She studied at Columbia University, where she got a Master of Arts degree in 1923, and briefly worked at Rockford College as a history instructor (1923–1926) and assistant professor (1926–1929).

After earning a certificate from the Geneva Graduate Institute in 1928, Campbell entered Yale University. After losing her bank savings in the Great Depression, she convinced Wallace Notestein to take her in as a student for an independent course specifically for her. A 1930-1932 Yale University Fellow, she subsequently obtained her PhD at Yale in 1932. That same year, she started working at Vassar College as a history instructor; she was then promoted to assistant professor in 1935, associate professor in 1937, and full professor in 1941. She was also a 1935-1937 Sterling Fellow, where she spent time studying in England, as well as a 1948 Vassar faculty fellow. During the 1951–1952 academic year, she studied at the University of Oxford as a visiting fellow of Lady Margaret Hall, Oxford. and a Fulbright Fellow. In 1962, she retired from Vassar.

In 1942, Campbell released the book The English Yeoman In The Tudor and Early Stuart Age. She edited the 1947 Classics Club editions of Utopia and William Roper's Life of More. In 1951, she was awarded a Guggenheim Fellowship "for a study of English emigration in the 17th and 18th centuries". She also contributed to Seventeenth-Century America (1959) and Conflict in Stuart England (1970). She was elected Fellow of the Royal Historical Society for her work on The English Yeoman, and also obtained an honorary doctor of law from Rockford College (1960) and an honorary degree from Maryville College (1961). She was president of the Berkshire Conference of Women Historians, and she was part of the American History Association and Institute of Early American History and Culture councils, as well as an executive council member for the Anglo-American Conference of Historians.

A resident of Grandview, Rhea County, Tennessee in the 1940s, Campbell had moved to a house in Poughkeepsie, New York, by the time of her death, living with fellow Vassar history professor Evalyn A. Clark for decades.

Campbell died on February 19, 1991, at her Poughkeepsie home. She was 93.

== Works ==
- The English Yeoman (1942) (Note: Reviews of this book:)
