= Patricia Cox Miller =

American religion academic

Patricia Cox Miller is an American religion academic. She is the (Bishop) W. Earl Ledden Professor Emerita of Religion at Syracuse University. She researches religious imagination in late antiquity, religion and aesthetics in late antiquity, early Christian asceticism, women and religion in late antiquity, early Christian and pagan hagiography and ancient art.

== Education ==
Miller completed her BA in history at Mary Washington College of University of Virginia in 1969. She then did a year of Special Study at the Hebrew University of Jerusalem in Israel from 1969 to 1970. Following this she completed an MA in the History of Christianity at the University of Chicago in 1972 and her Ph.D., also at the University of Chicago, on Religion in Late Antiquity in 1979.

== Career ==
Miller spent a year as an Assistant Professor of Religion at the University of Washington from 1975 to 1976, before moving to New York and rising through the ranks of the Department of Religion at Syracuse University from 1977–present. She has been a member of several professional societies such as the Society of Biblical Literature, the North American Patristic Society and the Society for the Arts, Religion and Contemporary Culture.

She has also been on the editorial board for journals such as The Second Century (now the Journal of Early Christian Studies, for which she was also on the Board of Senior Editors), The Syracuse Scholar which ran from 1979 to 1991, Signs: Journal of Women in Culture and Society, and Church History: A Journal of Christianity and Culture as well as the Patristic Monograph Series and being a member of the National Endowment for the Humanities Summer Grant Evaluation Committee.

== Publications ==
- Biography in Late Antiquity: A Quest for the Holy Man, University of California Press, 1983)
- Dreams in Late Antiquity: Studies in the Imagination of a Culture, Princeton University Press, (1994). (paperback ed., 1998) (also available in Spanish and Italian translation)
- The Poetry of Thought in Late Antiquity: Essays on Imagination and Religion, Ashgate Publishing, Ltd (2001)
- Journal of Medieval and Early Modern Studies 33.3 (Fall, 2003), guest editor, With Prof. Dale Martin, of this special issue in honor of Elizabeth A. Clark
- The Cultural Turn in Late Ancient Studies: Gender, Asceticism, and History, ed. Patricia Cox Miller and Dale B. Martin, Duke University Press (2005)
- Women in Early Christianity: Translations from Greek Texts, The Catholic University Press of America (2005)
- The Corporeal Imagination: Signifying the Holy in Late Ancient Christianity, University of Pennsylvania Press (2009)
